= Peter Cummins =

Australian character actor (1931–2024)

- Born: Donald Cummins; 2 June 1931; Melbourne, Victoria, Australia
- Died: 4 October 2024 (aged 93)
- Occupation: Actor
- Years active: 1965–2003

Donald Cummins (2 June 1931 – 4 October 2024), better known as Peter Cummins, was an Australian actor of stage and screen and chorister who was especially prominent in the 1970s and appeared in some of the most famous Australian films of the period.

== Early life ==
Peter Cummins was born on 2 June 1931, in Melbourne, Victoria. Before becoming an actor, he was a plumbing teacher.

== Career ==
Cummins was part of the Carlton group that were influential in Australian theatre of the early 1970s, which also included David Williamson, Max Gillies, Graeme Blundell and Bruce Spence. He performed extensively for the stage, working for all of Australia's major theatre companies, including the Melbourne Theatre Company for whom he appeared in The Christian Brothers, The Threepenny Opera, Glengarry Glen Ross, Trumpets and Raspberries, The One Day of the Year, Heartbreak House, The Servant of Two Masters, Romeo and Juliet, As You Like, And the Big Men Fly and A Respectable Wedding.

He also undertook a two year contract with Adelaide's Lighthouse Theatre (now State Theatre Company of South Australia) under the artistic direction of Jim Sharman from 1982 to 1984, alongside fellow actors Geoffrey Rush, Melissa Jaffer, Gillian Jones, Melita Jurisic, Russell Kiefel, Robert Menzies, Robert Grubb, Kerry Walker and John Wood.

Cummins won the Sammy Award for Best Actor for his performance in 1976 Australian film The Removalists, based on the 1971 play of the same name by David Williamson. which he had also performed on stage several times. That same year he also starred in the film adaptation of Colin Thiele's Australian literary classic Storm Boy. Other film credits include Stork (1971), Between Wars (1974), Sunday Too Far Away (1975), Mad Dog Morgan (1976), and Blue Fire Lady (1977), Twelfth Night (1986), Ground Zero (1987) and The Man from Snowy River II (1988).

Cummins has also appeared in numerous television series, including miniseries Power Without Glory, children's series Come Midnight Monday, police procedural series' Division 4 and Cop Shop, Australian classic The Sullivans, legal drama Carson's Law, miniseries' Against the Wind and The Great Bookie Robbery and medical drama A Country Practice.

== Personal life and death ==
Cummins was a long-term resident of Fitzroy, Victoria. He died on 4 October 2024, at the age of 93. He was survived by nieces Jane and Juliet.

== Awards ==
Year	Work	Award	Category	Result
1976	The Removalists	Sammy Award	Best Actor	Won

== Filmography ==
=== Film ===
Year	Title	Role	Notes
1970	Dead Easy	Stranger 2	
1970	Nothing Like Experience		
1971	Country Town	First Lair	
1971	Bonjour Balwyn	TV repairman	
1971	Stork	Sculptor	
1971	Carson's Watermelons		Short film
1971	The Hot Centre of the World		Short film
1973	Dalmas	Plastic Man	
1973	Alvin Purple	Cab Driver	
1974	Between Wars	Steele	
1975	The Firm Man	Gerald Baxter	
1975	Sunday Too Far Away	Arthur Black	
1975	The Great Macarthy	Rerk	
1975	The Removalists	Sergeant Simmonds	
1976	The Dreamers		
1976	God Knows Why, But it Works	Father / The Hospital Super / The Judge / The Public Servant	
1976	Mad Dog Morgan	Thomas Gibson	
1976	Storm Boy	Hideaway Tom	
1977	High Rolling	Bus Driver	
1977	Blue Fire Lady	McIntyre	
1983	Double Deal	Detective Mills	
1985	I Live with Me Dad	Sergeant	
1986	Sky Pirates	Colonel Brien	
1986	Frog Dreaming	Neville	
1986	Kangaroo	Struthers	
1986	Devil in the Flesh	Brother	
1987	The Umbrella Woman (aka The Good Wife)	Ned Hopper	
1987	Slate, Wyn & Me	Old Man Downer	
1987	Ground Zero	Ballantyne	
1988	The Man from Snowy River II	Jake	
1988	Rikky and Pete	Delahunty	

=== Television ===
Year	Title	Role	Notes
1970–1975	Division 4	Various	8 episodes
1970–1975	Homicide	Various	6 episodes
1973	Frank and Francesca		6 episodes
1973	Brumby Innes	Jack Carey	TV play
1973	Dimboola: The Stage Play	Horrie McAdam	TV play
1973–1976	Matlock Police	Various	3 episodes
1974	Marion	Bus Driver	3 episodes
1974	Who Killed Jenny Langby?	Frank Langby	TV movie
1976	Tandarra	Elliot Bjornstrom	Miniseries, 1 episode
1976	Solo One	Rod Hudson	1 episode
1976	Power Without Glory	Detective Sgt O'Flaherty	Miniseries, 4 episodes
1976	The Outsiders	Mick Dunn	1 episode
1977	Bluey	Detective Sgt Stoner	1 episode
1977	Trial of Ned Kelly	Sergeant McIntyre	TV movie
1977–1981	Cop Shop	Various	15 episodes
1978	The Lion's Share	Sam Jackson	TV movie
1978	Against the Wind	Isaac Nichols	Miniseries, 1 episode
1978	The Sullivans	Colonel Walker	8 episodes
1979	Twenty Good Years	Tom Evans	3 episodes
1979	Skyways	Les Mitchell / Raymond Dixon	2 episodes
1980	Water Under the Bridge	Rumbolt	Miniseries, 1 episode
1981	Mortimer's Patch	Johnny Morgan	1 episode
1981	Prisoner	Hartman	2 episodes
1981	Holiday Island	Robert Porter	1 episode
1981	The Homicide Squad	Harry	TV movie
1982	Come Midnight Monday	Albert Spack	7 episodes
1984	Special Squad	Dixie Hanrahan	1 episode
1984	Carson's Law	Dr James West	2 episodes
1985	Robbery Under Arms	Moran	TV movie
1986	A Fortunate Life	Stepfather	Miniseries, 1 episode
1986	The Fish Are Safe	Ned Foley	Miniseries
1986	The Great Bookie Robbery	Father Moore	Miniseries, 3 episodes
1986	The Local Rag	Phil Bonnard	TV movie
1986	Twelfth Night	Malvolio	TV movie
1988; 1990	The Flying Doctors		2 episodes
1989	Beyond Innocence		
1990	A Country Practice	Father Moore	2 episodes
1991	Turn It Up	Mr Banks	TV movie
1992	Fast Forward	Additional cast	1 episode
1992–1993	Phoenix	Superintendent Wallace	26 episodes
1993	R.F.D.S.	Reg Matthews	1 episode
2003	The Forest	David	TV movie

== Theatre credits ==
Year	Title	Role	Notes	Ref.
1965	Oklahoma!			
1968	Commitment			
1969	Escape		La Mama, Melbourne	
1969	I Don't Know Who to Feel Sorry For		La Mama, Melbourne	
1969	May Day		La Mama, Melbourne	
1969	Dimboola		La Mama, Melbourne	
1969	The Kitchen Table		La Mama, Melbourne	
1969	Mr Big the Big Big Pig		La Mama, Melbourne	
1969	The Elephant Calf / The Exception and the Rule		La Mama, Melbourne	
1969	Whatever Happened to Realism?		La Mama, Melbourne	
1970	Customs and Excise		University of Melbourne	
1970	The Front Room Boys		La Mama, Melbourne	
1970	The Coming of Stork		La Mama, Melbourne	
1970	The Man from Chicago		La Mama, Melbourne	
1971	Life of Galileo			
1971; 1977	The Removalists	Sergeant Dan Simmonds	La Mama, Melbourne with MTC	
1972	Bastardy		Pram Factory, Melbourne with APG	
1972	Brumby Innes	Jack Carey	Pram Factory, Melbourne with APG	
1972; 1973	A Stretch of the Imagination	Monk O'Neill	Pram Factory, Melbourne with APG, Newtown Theatre, Sydney	
1973	One of Nature's Gentlemen / O / Just Before the Honeymoon / Mrs Thally F		Pram Factory, Melbourne with APG	
1973	Waltzing Matilda: a national pantomime with tomato sauce		Pram Factory, Melbourne with APG	
1973	Dimboola	Horace 'Horrie' McAdam	Pram Factory, Melbourne with APG	
1974	The Floating World		Pram Factory, Melbourne with APG	
1976	Chidley	Chidley	Grant St Theatre, Melbourne	
1976	The Overcoat	Kak	Pram Factory, Melbourne	
1976	Waiting for Godot		Monash University Alexander Theatre, Melbourne	
1977	Memories of a Carlton Bohemian: Revival		La Mama, Melbourne	
1977	Ravages: Heels Over Head / Dropping In		La Mama, Melbourne	
1977	Three Old Friends		La Mama, Melbourne	
1977	Dimboola			
1978	Oh / Let Me In		Playbox Theatre, Melbourne	
1979	Errol Flynn's Great Big Adventure Book for Boys			
1979	Flexitime			
1979	The Club	Jack 'Jacko' Holbrook	St Martins Theatre, Melbourne	
1979	The Hypothetical End of Bert Brecht		Russell St Theatre, Melbourne	
1980	A Month in the Country			
1980	The Seagull		Monash University Alexander Theatre, Melbourne	
1980	The Ship's Whistle			
1980	The One Day of the Year	Alf	MTC	
1981	Fanchen		Price Theatre, Adelaide	
1981	I Sent a Letter to My Love	Stan Evans	Playbox Theatre, Melbourne	
1981	True West		Playbox Theatre, Melbourne	
1982	Lighthouse Playreading		Lighthouse Theatre, Adelaide	
1982	Mother Courage and Her Children		Lighthouse Theatre, Adelaide	
1982	Royal Show		Lighthouse Theatre, Adelaide	
1982	Silver Lining		Lighthouse Theatre, Adelaide	
1982	Signal Driver	Being	Lighthouse Theatre, Adelaide	
1982	Spellbound			
1982	The Prince Of Homburg			
1982; 1983	A Midsummer Night's Dream		Lighthouse Theatre, Adelaide	
1983	Pal Joey		Lighthouse Theatre, Adelaide	
1983	Sunrise		Lighthouse Theatre, Adelaide	
1983	The Blind Giant Is Dancing	Doug Fitzgerald	STCSA with Belvoir Theatre Company	
1983	The Marriage of Figaro		Lighthouse Theatre, Adelaide	
1983	Twelfth Night		Lighthouse Theatre, Adelaide	
1983; 1984	Netherwood	Harry	Lighthouse Theatre, Adelaide	
1984	The Christian Brothers			
1984	The Threepenny Opera	Tiger Brown		
1985	Glengarry Glen Ross	Levene	Russell St Theatre, Melbourne, with MTC	
1985	Trumpets and Raspberries	Antonio Beradi	Playhouse, Melbourne with MTC	
1986	The One Day of the Year	Alf Cook	Playhouse, Melbourne with MTC	
1986	Heartbreak House			
1986	The Servant of Two Masters		STCSA	
1987	Away			
1988	And the Big Men Fly	Wally Sloss	Russell St Theatre, Melbourne, with MTC	
1988	Romeo and Juliet / As You Like It	Capulet / Corin	Playhouse, Melbourne with MTC	
1988	A Marriage Proposal / A Respectable Wedding			
1989	Little Murders			
1989	The Cherry Orchard			
1989	A Respectable Wedding		Russell St Theatre, Melbourne, with MTC	
1989	Top End	Dolly	Russell St Theatre, Melbourne, with MTC	
1990	On Top of the World	Clive	Russell St Theatre, Melbourne, with MTC	
1991	Diving for Pearls	Den	Russell St Theatre, Melbourne, with MTC	
1991	On Our Selection	Abe Pettigrew	Playhouse, Melbourne with MTC	
1991	The Crucible	Giles Corey	Playhouse, Melbourne with MTC	
1991	The Taming of the Shrew		Playhouse, Melbourne with MTC	
1993	Coriolanus			
1995	The Floating World		Merlyn Theatre, Melbourne, with Playbox Theatre Company	
2001	Nowhere	Josh	Playbox Theatre, Melbourne	
2021	The Boy from Oz	Greg Connell	Australian national tour	
