= John Timlin =

Australian theatre producer and literary agent

John Timlin is a theatre producer, literary agent and was the administrator of the Australian Performing Group in Melbourne.

== Australian Performing Group ==
Timlin was requested to invest in the APG while he ran a business in North Melbourne manufacturing weighbridges.

After locating a desirable venue in Carlton to serve as a possible new base, Graeme Blundell approached Timlin for financing in 1970.. Timlin agreed and took out a three-year lease on the property for $100 a week. The existing structure was built in 1912 to serve as a livery. Later it was rumoured to have been a brothel, a German Club, a boxing ring and a dance hall. Notably, as declared by the fading sign on the building's turret, it had manufactured prams in the 1920s; prompting the inspiration of the moniker The Pram Factory.

Timlin was to oversee the APG through most of its existence, described as the group's "organiser, administrator and bagman". Notable APG member Bruce Spence said of him, "He did the things we wouldn't stoop to do. He got us the money that gave us the freedom to do what we creatively wanted. He spoke to the bureaucrats. He was the respectable face fronting all us ratbags just wanting to tear the place apart.". Another prominent APG member, Kerry Dwyer described Timlin as one of the "Irish heavies" in the group who "ran the office from the pub". He took a variety of production roles, including construction, set design, producing and is credited as a co-creator of the outside production of Goodbye Ted with Jack Hibberd and The Dudders with John Romeril. He was involved in the founding of an APG label, Pram Factory Productions, which co-financed the 1979 film adaptation of Hibberd's 1969 hit Dimboola. The Almost Managing Company, which acted as both literary and actors' agency for people involved with the APG, was another enterprise.

After the demise of APG in 1981, Timlin continued to work with various group members, including producing the musical adaptation of Manning Clark's The History of Australia and many satirical live shows with Max Gillies such as A Night With The Right, The Max Gillies Summit and A Night of National Reconciliation culminating in packaging The Gillies Report for ABC television. He continued his work as director of the Almost Managing Company until its sale to Bryson Investments. In recent years Timlin has documented his work in the theatre while still working as a literary agent and editor.

== Sources ==
- Blundell, G. (1997). Australian theatre: backstage with Graeme Blundell. Melbourne: Oxford University Press.
- Blundell, Graeme (1 February 2011). The Naked Truth: A life in parts. Hachette Australia. ISBN 978-0-7336-2690-6.
- Ingleton, S. (n.d.). Australian Theatre History
- Oakley, Barry (2012). Mug Shots: A Memoir. Wakefield Press. ISBN 978-1-74305-167-2.
- Parsons, Philip; Chance, Victoria (1995). Companion to Theatre in Australia. Currency Press. ISBN 978-0-86819-357-1.
- Robertson, T.(2001) The Pram Factory: The Australian Performing Group Recollected, Melbourne University Press
- Wolf, G. (2011) Make It Australian - The Australian Performing Group, Pram Factory & New Wave Theatre: Currency Press
