= Tim Robertson =

Australian actor and writer (1944 – c.2026)

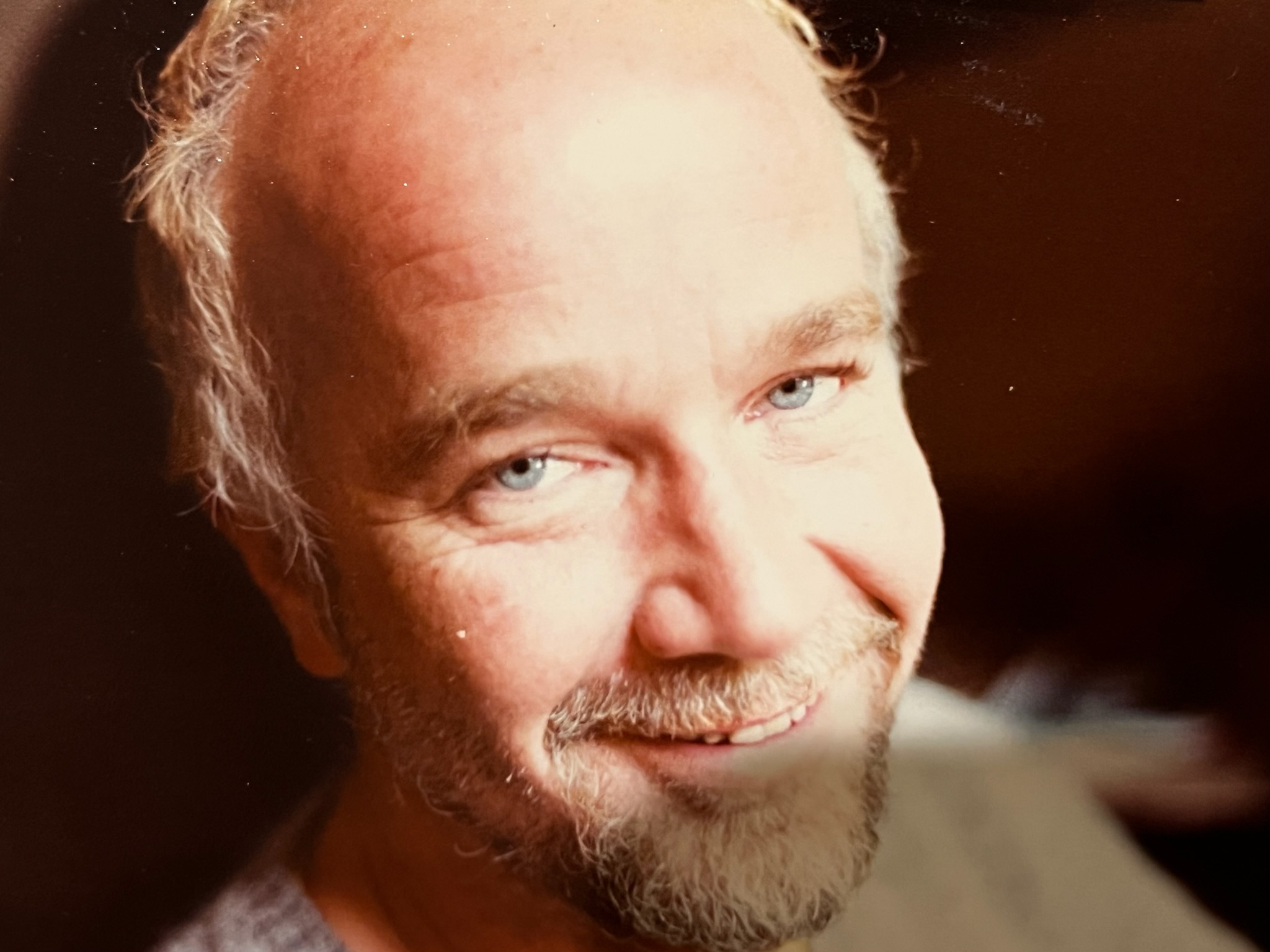
- Born: 1944; Braintree, Essex, England, UK
- Died: c. 28 December 2025 (aged 81); Melbourne, Victoria, Australia
- Education: University of Western Australia (1965)
- Occupations: Actor; writer
- Years active: 1972–2014
- Known for: Power Without Glory (1976); A Thousand Skies (1985); Chances (1991–1992); Stingers (1998)

Tim Robertson (1944 – c. 2 January 2026) was an Australian actor and writer.

== Early life ==
Robertson was born in Braintree, Essex, England, in 1944. He relocated to Australia in 1952.

He was a graduate of the University of Western Australia (1965). After graduating, he taught drama at various institutions including Antioch College in the US (1967-1968) and Flinders University in Adelaide (1969-1972) where he also began adapting and directing plays.

In 1972, he joined the Australian Performing Group at the Pram Factory in Melbourne, where he wrote, acted and directed plays.

== Career ==
Robertson made his first onscreen appearance in 1974 on the television series Rush. The same year he also featured in the cult Ozploitation horror film The Cars That Ate Paris.

He is known for his role as Arthur West in the 1976 award-winning drama miniseries Power Without Glory. From 1983 to 1984, he played various roles in the comedy series Australia You're Standing In It. He then appeared in the 1987 Kennedy Miller miniseries Vietnam alongside Nicole Kidman in one of her early roles. From 1991 to 1992, Robertson had a regular role as Jack Taylor in the risqué soap opera Chances. He also appeared in two roles in police procedural crime drama series Stingers from 1999 to 2003.

Robertson had numerous television guest roles in series such as Matlock Police, Homicide, Rush, Division 4, Bluey, The Sullivans, Skyways, Cop Shop, Young Ramsay, Special Squad, Carson's Law, Prisoner, Rafferty's Rules, Round the Twist, Neighbours, The Flying Doctors, Ocean Girl, Halifax f.p., Snowy River: The McGregor Saga, CrashBurn and Last Man Standing.

He also starred in several miniseries including Tandarra (1976), Against the Wind (1978), Scales of Justice (1983), The Heroes (1989) and All the Rivers Run II (1990).

Robertson appeared in numerous films throughout his career. Early films included Petersen (1974) with Jack Thompson, football comedy The Great MacArthy (1975), Fred Schepisi's The Chant of Jimmie Blacksmith (1978), John Duigan's Dimboola (1979) and biographical drama Phar Lap (1983).

He appeared in the 1987 coming-of-age John Duigan film The Year My Voice Broke starring Ben Mendelsohn and Noah Taylor. The following year he was in Evil Angels opposite Meryl Streep and Sam Neill. He appeared opposite Mendelsohn again in the 1990 hit comedy The Big Steal and the 1997 drama Amy. He was then in the 1999 film Holy Smoke with Kate Winslet and Harvey Keitel.

Later films included 2001 comedies He Died with a Felafel in His Hand alongside Noah Taylor and The Man Who Sued God opposite Billy Connolly and Judy Davis, the 2010 drama Matching Jack, the 2011 film The Eye of the Storm opposite Geoffrey Rush and the 2014 Angus Sampson comedy The Mule.

In 2001, he published a history of the Pram Factory.

On 28 December 2025, it was announced that Robertson had died at the age of 81.

== Filmography ==
=== Film ===
Year	Title	Role	Notes
1974	The Cars That Ate Paris	Les	
1974	Petersen	3rd Bikie	
1975	The Great MacArthy	Herb	
1975	Pure S	Cop	
1978	The Irishman	Bill Bryant	
1978	The Chant of Jimmie Blacksmith	Healey	
1979	Dimboola	Father O'Shea	
1979	The Last of the Knucklemen	Man in Bar	
1980	Buckley's Chance	William Buckley	Short film
1983	Phar Lap	Policeman at Stables	
1983	Distinguished Guests	Professor Wiseman	Short film
1984	The Bark is Worse than the Byte		Short film
1985	Wrong World	Psychiatrist	
1985	Bliss	Alex Duval	
1985	Jenny Kissed Me	Sergeant Blake	
1985	Niel Lynne	Detective	
1986	Kangaroo	O'Neill	
1987	Going Sane	Owen Owen	
1987	The Year My Voice Broke	Bob Leishman	
1987	Bachelor Girl	Grant	
1987	The Time Guardian	Sergeant McCarthy	
1987	With Time to Kill	Jack Keane	
1988	Evil Angels (aka A Cry in the Dark)	Wallace	
1990	Father	George Coleman	
1990	Aya	Willy	
1990	The Big Steal	Desmond Johnson	
1990	Beyond My Reach	Burroughs	
1994	Ebbtide	Realtor	
1997	Amy	Dr Pascoe	
1999	Holy Smoke	Gilbert Barron	
2001	He Died with a Felafel in His Hand	Melbourne Detective 1	
2001	The Man Who Sued God	Judge	
2002	Black and White	Mr Kjng	
2006	Riot or Revolution: Eureka Stockade 1854	Douglas Huyghue	Documentary film
2010	Matching Jack	Professor Langley	
2011	The Eye of the Storm	Dr Treweek	
2011	The First Interview	Nadar	Short film
2014	The Mule	Judge Irving	

=== Television ===
Year	Title	Role	Notes
1974	Matlock Police	Peter Gibson	1 episode
1974	Marion	Reg Dargie	Miniseries, 1 episode
1974	Homicide	Engineer	1 episode
1974	Rush	Constable Colvin	1 episode
1975	Division 4	Ambulance Driver	1 episode
1975	Cash and Company	Reed	1 episode
1976	Tandarra	Storekeeper	Miniseries, 1 episode
1976	The Professional Touch		TV movie
1976	Power Without Glory	Arthur West	Miniseries, 14 episodes
1977	Bluey	Paul Hendy	1 episode
1978	Catspaw	Instructor	
1978	Against the Wind	Holt	Miniseries, 2 episodes
1978	The Tea Ladies		8 episodes
1978	The Sullivans	Slicker	4 episodes
1979	Skyways	Bert Dyer	1 episode
1979	Cop Shop	Hedley Barrett	1 episode
1979	The Dolebludgers	Mr Price	TV movie
1980	Young Ramsay	Russell Scott	1 episode
1980	Locusts and Wild Honey	Reverend Charles	Miniseries, 3 episodes
1983	Home	Tom	3 episodes
1983	Scales of Justice	Detective Sergeant Mick Miles	Miniseries, 2 episodes
1984	The Last Bastion	Admiral Ernest King	Miniseries, 3 episodes
1984	Special Squad	Roberts	Episode 2: "The Expert"
1984	Carson's Law	Det Sgt Brent	2 episodes
1983–1984	Australia You're Standing In It	Various	16 episodes
1985	A Thousand Skies	Jack Lang	Miniseries, 1 episode
1979–1995	Prisoner	Various roles	9 episodes
1986	Pokerface	Huck	Miniseries, 3 episodes
1986	Vietnam	Pascoe	Miniseries, 3 episodes
1988	Rafferty's Rules	Mervyn Starkey	1 episode
1988	The Clean Machine	Dr Michael Millius	TV movie
1989	The Heroes	Colonel Mott	Miniseries
1989	Round the Twist	Mr Henderson	1 episode
1989	Bodysurfer	Rex Lang	Miniseries, 2 episodes
1989	Neighbours	Gordon Davies	4 episodes
1990	All the Rivers Run II	Blackwell	Miniseries, 2 episodes
1990	Police Crop: The Winchester Conspiracy	Detective Sergeant Brian Lockwood	TV movie
1990	Skirts	Harrison	1 episode
1989; 1990	The Flying Doctors	Dan Jackson / Bernie Gallagher	2 episodes
1991	Strangers	Father	TV movie
1991	Boys from the Bush	Bobby	1 episode
1991–1992	Chances	Jack Taylor	Episodes 1-90
1993	Time Trax	Joe the Sheriff	1 episode
1994	Ocean Girl	Blunt	1 episode
1995	Halifax f.p.	Joe Mandle	Episode: "Hard Corps"
1995	Snowy River: The McGregor Saga	Trooper John Clarke	1 episode
1997	Kangaroo Palace	Charles Reid	TV movie
1999	Thunderstone	General Cardell	2 episodes
2001	Beastmaster	Solon	1 episode
2001	Shock Jock	Dr Arnold Kipax	1 episode
2002	Bootleg	Prime Minister Tom Turner	Miniseries, 3 episodes
1999–2003	Stingers	Fergus McCallum / George Tyndall / Sgt Noel Harrison	3 episodes
2003	CrashBurn	John	2 episodes
2005	Last Man Standing	Bride's Dad	1 episode

== Theatre ==
=== As actor ===
Year	Title	Role	Notes
1964	Doctor Faustus		University of Melbourne
1972	Bastardy		Pram Factory, Melbourne, with APG
1972	He Can Swagger Sitting Down / The Joss Adams Show		Pram Factory, Melbourne, with APG
1972	A Night in Rio and Other Bummers		Pram Factory, Melbourne, with APG
1973	The Dragon Lady's Revenge		Pram Factory, Melbourne, with APG
1973	Dimboola		Pram Factory, Melbourne, with APG
1976	Knuckle	Patrick	Pram Factory, Melbourne, with APG
1976	The Dudders	Colonel Coop / Phil Furley	Pram Factory, Melbourne, with APG
1977	Ravages: Heels Over Head	Cecil	La Mama, Melbourne
1978	It's a Mad World, My Masters		Pram Factory, Melbourne, with APG
1978	No Room for Dreamers	Chidley	Canberra for Australian National Playwrights Conference
1980	Bremen Coffee	Gottfried	Melbourne Athenaeum with MTC
1980	Shakespeare the Sadist	Bill	Melbourne Athenaeum with MTC
1981	Upside Down at the Bottom of the World	DH Lawrence	Theatre 62, Adelaide with STCSA
1981	Teeth 'n' Smiles	Saraffian	Nimrod, Sydney
1984	The World Is Made of Glass	Carl Jung	St Martins Theatre, Melbourne with Playbox Theatre Company
1985	Nine Little Australians! Season Two		YMCA, Melbourne with MTC
1993	Picasso at the Lapin Agile		Malthouse Theatre, Melbourne with Playbox Theatre Company
2004	The Frail Man	Henry Frail	Malthouse Theatre, Melbourne with Playbox Theatre Company
2006	Romeo and Juliet		Playhouse, Melbourne, Sydney Opera House with Bell Shakespeare
2007	Dimboola		Malthouse Theatre, Melbourne

=== As director/playwright ===
Year	Title	Role	Notes
1973	Dimboola	Director	Chevron Hotel, Melbourne
1973	The Waltzing Matilda Pantomime	Designer	Pram Factory, Melbourne, with APG
1974	The River Jordan	Director	Pram Factory, Melbourne, with APG
1975	Mary Shelley and Her Monsters	Playwright	Pram Factory, Melbourne, with APG
1976	Fiery Tales / Looney Tunes (The Lamentable Reign of King Charles the Last)	Librettist	Scott Theatre, Adelaide with New Opera South Australia for Adelaide Festival
1976	The Overcoat	Director	Pram Factory, Melbourne, with APG
1977	Waiter, There's a Circus in My Soup	Director	The Last Laugh, Melbourne with Last Laugh Theatre Restaurant & New Circus Ensemble
1980	Tram	Director	Melbourne Comedy Cafe
1981	Wild Honey	Writer	National Theatre, Melbourne with Australian Contemporary Dance Company
1981	Squirts	Writer	Playhouse, Adelaide, Universal Theatre, Melbourne with STCSA
1982	Tristram Shandy	Adaptor	Nimrod, Sydney
1985	Mary Shelley and the Monsters	Playwright	Rocks Players Theatre, Sydney for Sydney Festival
1988	Manning Clark's History of Australia – The Musical	Playwright	Princess Theatre, Melbourne
1988	Tristram Shandy – Gent	Adaptor	Russell Street Theatre, Melbourne, with MTC for MICF
1994	Waltzing Matilda (with Tomato Sauce)	Writer	The Street Theatre, Acton, Canberra with Eureka! Theatre Company
1997	Mary Shelley and the Monsters	Playwright	Carlton Courthouse, Melbourne with La Mama
