= Dimboola (1979 film) =

- Directed by: John Duigan
- Written by: Jack Hibberd; John Power
- Based on: Dimboola by Jack Hibberd
- Produced by: Max Gillies; John Timlin; John Weiley
- Starring: Bruce Spence
- Cinematography: Tom Cowan
- Edited by: Tony Paterson
- Music by: George Dreyfus
- Distributed by: Greater Union; Umbrella Entertainment; Videoscope
- Release date: 1979
- Running time: 89 minutes
- Country: Australia
- Language: English
- Budget: A$350,000

Dimboola is a 1979 Australian independent film directed by John Duigan about a country wedding reception. It is based on the 1969 play of the same name by Jack Hibberd and was principally filmed on location in Dimboola, Victoria.

== Plot ==
English journalist arrives in a small country town to observe a wedding.

== Cast ==
- Bruce Spence as Morrie McAdam
- Natalie Bate as Maureen Delaney
- Max Gillies as Vivian Worcester-Jones
- Bill Garner as Dangles
- Jack Perry as Horrie
- Esme Melville as April
- Dick May as Shovel
- Irene Hewitt as Florence
- Val Jellay as Aggie
- Chad Morgan as Bayonet
- Max Cullen as Mutton
- Terry McDermott as Darcy

== Production ==
The movie was shot in Dimboola, Jeparit and Melbourne. The budget was originally $420,000 but was reduced to $350,000. $120,000 came from the Victorian Film Corporation, $75,000 from the New South Wales Film Corporation, $80,000 from Greater Union, and the rest from private investment.

John Duigan had written all his previous movies himself, and worked in a realist style whereas Hibberd's writing was more theatrical. Hibberd had trouble collaborating and Duigan feels they had entirely different interpretations of the material which hurt the final movie.

The character of the English journalist was added for Max Gillies. The film plays down the differences between the Catholic and Protestant families.

== Songs ==
- "We're Riding to the Never Never", music and lyrics: Letty Katts
- "Will You Love Him Tomorrow", music and original lyrics as "Will You Love Me Tomorrow" written by Gerry Goffin and Carole King, new lyrics George Dreyfus
- "The Sheik of Araby", music and lyrics by Harry B. Smith and Francis Wheeler, performed by The Captain Matchbox Whoopee Band
- "Red River Valley", traditional
- "Danny Boy", music by Frederic Weatherly
- "Flame" and "Femme Fatale", written and sung by Frankie Raymond

== Reception ==
The film was a box office disaster.

== Home media ==
A Collector's Edition of Dimboola was released on DVD by Umbrella Entertainment in October 2006. The DVD includes special features such as the original theatrical trailer, audio commentary with Jack Hibberd, John Timlin and Max Gillies, and interviews with David Williamson, Jack Hibberd, John Romeril, John Duigan, Graeme Blundell, Max Gillies and Bruce Spence. Also included is a feature-length film of the original stage play directed by David Williamson in 1973 and Pram Factory, a 1994 documentary on the Australian Performing Group.

A single DVD edition of Dimboola was released by Umbrella Entertainment in October 2008 with fewer special features.

Umbrella Entertainment has also released it in a three-disc DVD set with Puberty Blues and Monkey Grip.

== See also ==
- Cinema of Australia
