= Sue Jones (actress) =

Australian actress (born 1947)

- Born: Suzette Jones; 10 April 1947 (age 79); Wales
- Occupation: Actress
- Years active: 1974–present
- Known for: Neighbours, Prisoner

Suzette Jones (born 10 April 1947) (known as Sue Jones) is a Welsh-born Australian actress best known for her television roles, in soap operas, sitcoms and telemovies, in particular for playing the regular roles of Pam Willis in Neighbours and Kathy Hall in Prisoner.

== Career ==
After a guest role in Division 4 in 1974, Jones had a role in Power Without Glory, a hugely successful 1976 serialised adaptation of the historical Frank Hardy novel. This was followed by a recurring role in period drama The Sullivans in 1977 and a role as one of the titular tea ladies in short-lived situation comedy The Tea Ladies the following year.

In 1979, Jones played the role of Eddie’s landlady, Joyce Smith in the Australian version of British sitcom Love Thy Neighbour. In 1980, she played the recurring role of Kathy Hall in Prisoner and appeared as mother Lindy Parkes in six-part ABC children's drama series Sam's Luck.

Jones' early film credits included Dead Man's Float (1980), Blood Money (1980), Emerging (1985) and Bachelor Girl (1987). In 1988, she appeared in the drama film Mullaway, alongside Nadine Garner and Bill Hunter, which saw her nominated for an Australian Film Institute Award for Best Supporting Actress.

After attending a screen test, Jones secured a main role in Neighbours, as Pam Willis, mother to Adam (Ian Williams), Gaby (Rachel Blakely), Brad (Scott Michaelson) and Cody (Amelia Frid / Peta Brady). She initially rejected the offer to appear in the series, as she was worried that she would be "selling her theatrical soul", but after losing a part in a play, she changed her mind. She played the role from 1990 to 1994, before returning briefly in 1996.

During her tenure on Neighbours, Jones also appeared in 1995 miniseries Correlli, playing Sister Pat Riley, opposite Hugh Jackman in an early role and Deborra-Lee Furness.

In 2001, Jones appeared in crime thriller feature film The Bank, with David Wenham and Anthony LaPaglia.

Jones appeared in the short film Piñata, which premiered at the Melbourne International Film Festival in 2009. She also performed the lead role of Holocaust survivor, Magda in 2011 short film Adam's Tallit.

From 2013 to 2014, Jones began playing the regular role of Tivolli family matriarch Rosa in two seasons of ABC drama series The Time of Our Lives, alongside Claudia Karvan and Justine Clarke. During the same time period, she had a recurring role in the ABC comedy series Upper Middle Bogan as Pat. In 2014, she also reprised her role as Pam Willis on Neighbours for a guest stint, and then again in 2016, after Pam's husband Doug (played by Terence Donovan) lost his life in an explosion.

In 2017, Jones had a small role in independent comedy film That's Not Me. The following year, she appeared in drama miniseries The Cry as Mrs Wilson, alongside Asher Keddie and Ewen Leslie. Jones then had a guest role as Bev, opposite Tim Minchin, in the second season of comedy drama series Upright, in 2019.

Jones' further television credits include roles in Bluey, Cop Shop, The Flying Doctors, G.P., Halifax f.p., Good Guys, Bad Guys, Blue Heelers, City Homicide, Stingers, SeaChange, MDA, Winners & Losers, The Librarians, Underbelly, Last Man Standing and Satisfaction.

Jones has also had an extensive career in theatre, beginning with a performance in a 1976 production of The Foursome for Melbourne Theatre Company. Later in her career, she appeared in Anthony Crowley's Shadow Passion at Chapel Off Chapel in September 2007, in which she played the role of Margaret. Throughout her career, she has also performed in productions for Playbox Theatre, La Mama and State Theatre Company of South Australia.

== Awards and nominations ==
Year	Work	Award	Category	Result	Ref.
1988	Mullaway	Australian Film Institute Awards	Best Supporting Actress	Nominated	
1996	Kid Stakes	Green Room Awards	Best Female Supporting Actor	Nominated	
2014	The Time of Our Lives	Equity Ensemble Awards	Outstanding Performance by an Ensemble in a Drama Series	Nominated	
	Death of a Salesman	Green Room Awards		Nominated	
	Life After George	Green Room Awards		Nominated	

== Filmography ==
=== Film ===
Year	Title	Role	Type	Ref.
1980	Blood Money	Doctor	Feature film short	
1980	Nightmares	Fay	Feature film	
1980	Dead Man's Float (aka Smuggler's Cove)	Shirley Bell	Feature film	
1983	Break-in	Jan	Film short	
1984	Opal: The Rainbow in the Rock	Opal	Film short	
1986	The Humpty Dumpty Man	Adele Shadlow	Feature film	
1987	Bachelor Girl	Audrey	Feature film	
1988	Mull (aka Mullaway)	Deborah Mullens	Feature film	
1993	My Forgotten Man (aka Flynn)	Elsa Chauvel	Feature film	
2001	The Bank	Bank Barrister	Feature film	
2007	The Bloody Sweet Hit	Glenda	Film short	
2009	Pinata	Jill	Film short	
2010	Adam's Tallit	Magda	Film short	
2017	That's Not Me	Virginia, a cinema patron	Feature film	
2021	Some Happy Day	Sue	Feature film	

=== Television ===
Year	Title	Role	Type	Ref.
1974	Division 4	Doctor	1 episode	
1976	Power Without Glory	Bridget	Miniseries, 4 episodes	
1976	Bluey	Night Nurse	1 episode	
1977	The Sullivans	Jenny	4 episodes	
1978	The Tea Ladies	Lead role	8 episodes	
1979	Love Thy Neighbour In Australia	Joyce Smith	7 episodes	
1979	Skyways	Sue Bennett / Sandy	8 episodes	
1979–1981	Cop Shop	Karen Haywood / Virginia Royal / Bev Shields / Laura Coates / Nurse	6 episodes	
1980	Prisoner	Kathy Hall	5 episodes	
1980	Sam's Luck	Lindy Parkes	6 episodes	
1981	Prisoner	Sister Brookes	1 episode	
1981	Holiday Island	Susan Manton	1 episode	
1981	Home	Gaye Freeman	2 episodes	
1984	Special Squad	Nancy	1 episode	
1985	Emerging	Haley Birchfield	TV movie	
1985	The Fast Lane	Williams	1 episode	
1986	A Single Life	Gynaecologist	TV movie	
1986	Neighbours	Peggy O'Hara	1 episode	
1986	Studio 86	Chris Faulkner	Episode 6: "Many Are Called"	
1987	The Far Country	Betty Marshall	Miniseries, 2 episodes	
1988	The Flying Doctors	Lorraine	1 episode	
1990	Col'n Carpenter	Felicity	1 episode	
1990	Skirts	Actress	1 episode	
1990–1995	Neighbours	Pam Willis	327 episodes	
1991	Boys From The Bush	Daphne	1 episode	
1994	Newlyweds	Velda	1 episode	
1995	Halifax f.p.	Nicki Onslow	1 episode	
1995	Correlli	Sister Pat Riley	10 episodes	
1996	G.P.	Beth Curtis	1 episode	
1996–2001	Blue Heelers	June Allenby / Jeanette Fleming / Janet Lennox	4 episodes	
1997	Good Guys Bad Guys	Fay O'Malley	1 episode	
1997	State Coroner	Valerie Lowe	1 episode	
1998	SeaChange	Verna Miller	1 episode	
1999–2003	Stingers	Marilyn Harris / Judge / Alison Canning / Justice Balkin	5 episodes	
2001	Something in the Air	Judy	5 episodes	
2003	After The Deluge	Landlady	Miniseries, 1 episode	
2003	MDA	Magistrate Dianne Orchard	2 episodes	
2004	Stiff	Woman Next Door	TV movie	
2004	Stories from the Golf	Lorraine	1 episode	
2005	Last Man Standing	Gil Logan	5 episodes	
2007	City Homicide	Paulette Goddard	2 episodes	
2008	Underbelly	Medium	1 episode	
2009	Saved	Claire Weston	TV movie	
2009	The Elephant Princess	Isha	7 episodes	
2010	The Librarians	Olwyn Slider	2 episodes	
2010	The Librarians In Profile	Herself	1 episode	
2011	Killing Time	Helen Pritchet	Miniseries, 1 episode	
2011	Judith Lucy's Spiritual Journey	Psychic (flashback)	1 episode	
2012	Problems	Claudia's Mum	1 episode	
2013–2014	The Time of Our Lives	Rosa	16 episodes	
2013–2016	Upper Middle Bogan	Pat	6 episodes	
2015	The Beautiful Lie	Mira	Miniseries, 1 episode	
2016	Winners & Losers	Eileen Reeves	1 episode	
2018	The Cry	Mrs. Wilson	Miniseries, 2 episodes	
2019	Upright	Bev	1 episode	

== Theatre ==
=== As actor ===
Year	Title	Role	Venue / Co.	Ref.
1976	The Foursome		Victorian College of the Arts for MTC	
1977	No Worries	Joan	La Mama, Melbourne	
1977	Ravages: Heels Over Head / Dropping In	Nilma / Edna	La Mama, Melbourne	
1977	Doctor in Love	Mrs Tadwich	Australian tour	
1977	Blood Brothers	Yesha	La Mama, Melbourne	
1978	How Are You Feeling?		La Mama, Melbourne	
1980	Pieties	Hannah Vavaseur	La Mama, Melbourne	
1980	The Greatest Man on Earth		Playbox Theatre, Melbourne with Hoopla Theatre Foundation	
1980	The Seagull	Masha	Monash University with Alexander Theatre Company	
1981	The Two Headed Calf	Mirabella / Hag	Pram Factory Melbourne, University of Adelaide with APG	
1981	A Night in the Arms of Raeleen	Raeleen	Playbox Theatre, Melbourne	
1983	The Butterflies of Kalimantan	Kathy	Universal Theatre, Melbourne with Playbox	
Pre-1986	Sorry Sold Out		State Theatre Company of South Australia	
Pre-1986	The Perfectionist		State Theatre Company of South Australia	
Pre-1986	Travelling North		State Theatre Company of South Australia	
1986	Some Night in Julia Creek	Maggie	Russell St Theatre Melbourne with MTC	
1987	Wet and Dry	Laura	Russell St Theatre Melbourne with MTC	
1987	Shadowlands		La Mama, Melbourne	
1988	These Days		Melbourne Athenaeum with Melbourne Ensemble Theatre	
1995	Save Suvla Street	Hilda	La Mama, Melbourne	
1996	Kid Stakes	Emma Leech	Playhouse, Melbourne, Gold Coast Arts Centre with MTC	
1996	The Essentials		Trades Hall, Melbourne with Zeal Theatre	
1998	Macbeth		VIC regional tour with MTC	
2000	Elegy	Susan	Malthouse Theatre, Melbourne with Playbox	
2000	Violet Inc	Violet	Malthouse Theatre, Melbourne with Playbox	
2000	Death of a Salesman	Linda	Fairfax Studio, Melbourne with MTC	
2000–2001	Life After George	Lindsay	Australian tour with MTC	
2003	God's Last Acre	Christine	Malthouse Theatre, Melbourne with Playbox	
2004	The Frail Man	Jennifer Steel / Karen Mullen	Malthouse Theatre, Melbourne with Playbox	
2006	Sugar Mountain		Cinema Nova, Melbourne	
2007	Shadow Passion	Margaret	Chapel Off Chapel, Melbourne	
2010	Dead Man’s Cell Phone		Southbank Theatre, Melbourne with MTC	
2011	Don Parties On	Jenny	Playhouse, Melbourne, Sydney Theatre with MTC	
2013	Other Desert Cities	Silda Grauman	Southbank Theatre, Melbourne with MTC	
2014	Night on Bald Mountain	Mrs Sibley	Malthouse Theatre, Melbourne	
2017	Minnie and Liraz	Liraz Weinberg	Fairfax Studio, Melbourne, Geelong Arts Centre with MTC	
2017	The House of Bernarda Alba	Maria	MTC	
	Obsessive Behaviour in Small Spaces		La Mama, Melbourne	
	The One Day of the Year		Monash University, Melbourne	

=== As director/crew ===
Year	Title	Role	Venue / Co.	Ref.
1980	Rites	Director	Wood St Theatre, Newcastle	
1995	The Threepenny Opera	Costume Designer	Altona City Theatre, Melbourne	
2009	Entanglement	Director	Carlton Courthouse, Melbourne with La Mama Theatre	
2010	Status Update	Director	La Mama, Melbourne for Melbourne Fringe Festival	
2011	Strands	Director	La Mama, Melbourne	
