= Brumby Innes =

- Based on: Brumby Innes by Katharine Susannah Prichard
- Written by: Katharine Susannah Prichard
- Starring: Dennis Miller; Lynette Curran; Vic Marsh; Peter Cummins
- Country of origin: Australia
- Original language: English

Production
- Running time: 75 mins

Original release
- Network: Network 10
- Release: 26 June 1973

Brumby Innes is a play by Katharine Susannah Prichard, written in the 1920s but not performed professionally until 1972. A TV film adaptation was broadcast in 1973.

== Premise ==
A station manager lives alone in the outback except for his best friend and local black women. A white woman arrives.

== Play ==
Prichard's play had been written in the 1920s. In 1927 it won a competition for best Australian play.

It was performed in 1972 at The Pram Factory, Melbourne in an Australian Performing Group and Nindethana Theatre co-production.

== TV adaptation ==
- Dennis Miller as Brumby Innes
- Lynette Curran
- Vic Marsh
- Peter Cummins as Jack Carey
