= Dimboola (play) =

Dimboola is a play by the Australian author Jack Hibberd. It premiered in 1969 at La Mama Theatre under the direction of Graeme Blundell. The whole action of the play supposedly takes place at a real wedding at which the actors represent the families of the bride and groom and the audience are "invited guests". The play is described in the program notes as Rabelaisian and rumbustious.

== History ==
The play grew out of a reading in London of Anton Chekhov's 1889 play The Wedding and Bertolt Brecht's farce A Respectable Wedding. The production at La Mama was supported by a grant of $1,250 from the Australia Council for the Arts.

In 1970 Dimboola was chosen for performance as a climax to the Australian National University's "Bush Week" celebrations. Directed by Roger Vickery, it was performed on 26 July 1970 in the Tarago Hall to an audience of about 80 students who arrived there by steam train. Graham Farquhar, later Distinguished Professor and 2018 Senior Australian of the Year, played the Best Man, "Dangles".

The second professional production by the Australian Performing Group at The Pram Factory in 1973 was directed by David Williamson. This performance was filmed.

By 1974 it was thought the play had grossed over $1 million. By 1978 it was estimated it had been seen by over 350,000 people.

More Australians have seen Dimboola than any other stage musical, comedy or straight play, and hundreds of productions have been mounted across the world. It ran in Sydney for two and a half years until the venue, the Whiskey Au Go Go, burned down. In 1979, a film was made directed by John Duigan. In 1988, Pat Garvey adapted the play for a musical which alone has played over 2 000 performances. In 2007, it was produced at the Malthouse Theatre, Melbourne, with Max Gillies and directed by Michael Kantor. In March and April 2008 it played at the La Mama Theatre, directed by Robert Chuter.

A novelisation of the same name appeared in 1978, written by Tim Robertson and published by Sun Books, Melbourne.

== Plot ==
Dimboola is a celebration of the wedding of Protestant Morrie McAdam and Catholic Reen Delaney in the Mechanics' Institute Hall in Dimboola, Victoria. No holds are barred as the two families come together for the wedding which Jack Hibberd calls "the testing of strengths of the newly conjugated tribes". The family members try to preserve social grace and dignity in the face of impending disasters. And disasters there are aplenty! After the drink has flowed a little too freely, mayhem and humour ensues when the families exchange insults and punches, as they resolve to come to terms with the situation.

== Cast ==
- At the official table:
  - Maureen Delaney (Reen), bride
  - Morrie McAdam (Morrie), groom (Bruce Spence)
  - Darcy Delaney (Darkie), father of the bride
  - April Delaney (June), mother of the bride
  - Angus McAdam (Knocka), father of the groom
  - Florence McAdam (Florrie), mother of the groom
  - Patrick O'Shea, parish priest
  - Daryl Dunn (Dangles), best man
  - Shirl, town bike and bridesmaid
  - Astrid McAdam, flower girl
- Guests (invited)
  - Horace McAdam (Horrie the Horrible), uncle of the groom
  - Mavis McAdam, aunt of the groom
  - Aggie McAdam, spinster cousin to the McAdams
- Guests (uninvited)
  - Bayonet, local wit and drunk (Max Gillies)
  - Mutton, local wit and drunk (Graeme Blundell)
- The Band
  - Lionel Driftwood and His Piledrivers
- Others
  - Leonardo Radish, reporter of the Mildura Trumpet – a caricature of the theatre critic and playwright Leonard Radic

Original actors in brackets; other actors in the premiere production were Lindy Davies and John Romeril.

== Performance practice ==
The play uses audience participation to a very high degree; audience members are greeted by the father of the bride and the new arrivals are announced to the audience. Glasses of sherry and food are served by the actors, the auditorium is set up with tables and decorated with ballons and streamers. Audience members are assigned characters and actors improvise with them during the play's fights and shenanigans. The alcohol consumed on stage is often real.
