= Manning Clark's History of Australia – The Musical =

- Music: Martin Armiger and George Dreyfus with David King
- Lyrics: Tim Robertson and Don Watson with John Romeril
- Book: Tim Robertson and Don Watson with John Romeril
- Premiere: 16 January 1988: Princess Theatre, Melbourne
- Productions: 1988 Melbourne

Manning Clark's History of Australia – The Musical is an Australian musical by Tim Robertson and Don Watson with John Romeril with music by Martin Armiger and George Dreyfus with David King. Written to coincide with the Australian Bicentenary, the musical interweaves the life of historian Manning Clark from 1915 to 1988 with Australian history from 1788 to 1915, utilising drama, melodrama, music, song, comedy and circus.

== Development ==
Watson, Robertson and Romeril began working on a stage adaptation of Clark's (then) five volume A History of Australia in 1983.

== Production history ==
The original production opened at Melbourne's Princess Theatre on 16 January 1988, produced by John Timlin with investors including the Hoyts Corporation and Qantas, as part of Australian Bicentenary celebrations. It was directed by John Bell with choreography by Mark Daly and musical direction by David King.

Negative initial reviews and poor ticket sales resulted in the musical facing closure after three weeks. In an effort to continue, the cast agreed to forgo wages, the theatre owner waived the rent and Hoyts provided free publicity. History of Australia finally closed in late February 1988, well short of initial expectations and without proceeding to a national tour.

A cast recording produced by Martin Armiger was released by Polydor in 1988.

== Cast ==
- Terry Bader as de Quiros, Jack Ketch, Captain Gilbert, Jesus, Quong Tart, Bold Jack Donohue, Tom Roberts.
- Jonathan Biggins as Sir Joseph Banks, Captain Arthur Phillip, D'Arcy, WC and Billy Wentworth, Alfred Deakin, the Unknown Soldier.
- Terry Brady as Ensemble, chorus and understudy.
- Tina Bursill as Elizabeth Macarthur, St Peter, Caroline Chisholm, Kate Kelly, Lady Carrington.
- Darryl Emerson as Ned Ludd, Wharfie, Edmund Barton, understudy.
- Michele Fawdon as Dymphna Clark, Rose, Miss Macarthur.
- Bob Hornery as Cheng Ho, Frank the Poet, Bishop Broughton, Lord Carrington, Archbishop Mannix.
- Geoffrey Jenkins as Lenny the Spoons, Joe Byrne, Billy Hughes.
- Ivar Kants as Manning Clark, Reverend Marsden, Judge Barry.
- John McTernan as Captain Cook, Peter the Possum, William Bligh, Henry Parkes.
- Linda Nagle as Nance the Ferret, Mrs Wentworth, Queen Victoria.
- Helen Noonan as Lara, Mrs Cooper, Nellie Melba.
- Ingrid Silveus as Ensemble, chorus and understudy.
- Greg Stone as Isaac, the Judge, John Macarthur, Lachlan Macquarie, Roper, Charles Sturt, Henry Lawson.
- Carmen Tanti as Hicks, Luddite, Sheila bandicoot, Barmaid and understudy.
- Jenny Vuletic as Chartist, John the Baptist, Louisa Lawson, Mrs Parkes.
- Ross Williams as Abel Tasman, George III, Marine, Satan, Wharfie, Ned Kelly, George Reid.

== Critical reception ==
The musical received a mixed critical reaction. In Melbourne newspaper The Age, theatre critic Leonard Radic said the musical gave an overall impression of "patchiness and a failure of imagination". Playwright Jack Hibberd called Radic's review "disrespectful, captious and harsh" and "choked with terrible misjudgements".

== Musical numbers ==
- "One Story"
- "We Are They"
- "Sons of Enlightenment"
- "Nance the Ferret"
- "The Wentworth Samba"
- "The Cricket Song"
- "There Is No Love" (inc. "Inaugural Orgy of NSW")
- "We in the Shadows"
- "Spirit of the Place"
- "Gold"
- "Parp Parp"
- "The Kelly Gang Song"
- "Reedy River"
- "Louisa's Song"
- "Tailoresses" (inc. "Faces in the Street")
- "The Unknown Soldier"
- "Gallipolli"
- "Louisa Underscore"
- "Song of the Republic"

Musical numbers taken from the cast recording.

=== Orchestrations ===
Martin Armiger, Sharon Calcraft, Duncan Cameron, Ashley Irwin, David King, Derek Williams. In addition to a rhythm section, the lineup included two Kurzweil K250s that replaced the different orchestral sections with sampled sounds.
