= Max Gillies =

Australian actor (born 1941)

- Born: Maxwell Irvine Gillies; 16 November 1941 (age 84); Melbourne, Victoria, Australia
- Education: Frankston Teachers College, Monash University, University of Melbourne (Melbourne Teachers College)
- Occupations: Actor, theatre founder, associate producer
- Years active: 1962−present

Maxwell Irvine Gillies AM (born 16 November 1941) is an Australian actor and a founding member of the 1970s experimental theatre company, the Australian Performing Group.

== Early life and education ==
Gillies studied art teaching at Frankston Teachers College and featured in the theatre productions School for Scandal and Summer of the Seventeenth Doll with Kerry Dwyer in 1964. He graduated from Monash University with a Bachelor of Arts degree in 1966. He then studied secondary teaching at the Melbourne Teachers' College, now part of the University of Melbourne.

== Career ==
Gillies was a member of the Australian Performing Group (APG) in the 1970s. The group was officially formed in 1970 and then set up a theatre in a former pram factory in Drummond Street, Carlton. Here, and in other venues throughout Melbourne and other parts of Australia, the ensemble presented alternative, experimental, avant-garde and radical plays, musical comedies, vaudeville, stage shows, street theatre and circus acts, using comedy, drama, music and dance. In the many APG productions in which he appeared, Gillies became renowned for his prodigious talent as an actor and comedian. Those plays included "The Hills Family Show", "Dimboola" and "A Stretch of the Imagination".

In 1984–85, Gillies hosted The Gillies Report on ABC Television. This was followed in 1986 by Gillies Republic and in 1992 by Gillies and Company. He was known for his ability to dress up and parody a wide range of political figures, both on television and in live solo theatrical performances (i.e. The Big Con and Your Dreaming: The Prime Minister’s Cultural Convention). In July 2008 he resurrected his caricatures of Australia's former prime ministers in a live production of No Country for Old PMs: An Evening with Max Gillies at the Noosa Longweekend festival.

Gillies stated in an interview with The Courier-Mail that he and co-writer Guy Rundle were watching the then prime minister, Kevin Rudd, for a possible new caricature in a new production being developed. "I'm watching him closely" he said.

== Personal life ==
Gillies is married to publisher Louise Adler, and they have two adult children.

== Accolades ==
=== Honours ===
Gillies became a member of the Order of Australia on New Year's Day 1990 for his services to the performing arts. In 1997, he was recognised with a Distinguished Alumni Award from Monash University and was awarded an honorary Doctor of Laws degree in 2015.

=== Awards ===
Year	Organisation	Award	Result
1977	Theatre Australia Awards	Actor of the Year for A Stretch of the Imagination	Won
1985	Mo Awards	Specialty Act of the Year	Won

== Caricatures ==
Gillies, through his television programs or theatre performances, has caricatured the following people:

- Australian prime ministers: Robert Menzies, Harold Holt, William McMahon, Gough Whitlam, Malcolm Fraser, Bob Hawke, Paul Keating, John Howard, Kevin Rudd.
- Other Australian politicians: Kim Beazley, Alexander Downer, Amanda Vanstone, Ian Sinclair, Philip Ruddock, John Kerr, Don Chipp, Andrew Peacock, Fred Nile, Russ Hinze, Gareth Evans.
- Australian state premiers: Robert Askin, Henry Bolte, Neville Wran, Joh Bjelke-Petersen, John Bannon.
- Australian businessmen: Kerry Packer, Rupert Murdoch, Alan Bond, John Singleton, John Elliott.
- Australian writers: Phillip Adams, Bob Ellis, Geoffrey Blainey, Clive James, Thomas Keneally, Gerard Henderson, Bob Santamaria.
- Foreign leaders: Ronald Reagan, Pik Botha, F. W. de Klerk, Margaret Thatcher, Helmut Kohl, François Mitterrand, Yasuhiro Nakasone, Mikhail Gorbachev, David Lange, Queen Elizabeth II, George H. W. Bush, George W. Bush, Pope John Paul II.
- Other people: Tony Barber, Barry Crocker, David Attenborough, Jonathan Shier, Frank Sinatra, David McNicoll, Arthur Daley (a main character from Minder)

== Filmography ==
=== Film ===
Year	Film	Role	Notes
1971	Stork	Uncle Jack	
1971	The Girl on the Roof	Freddy	Short film
1973	Libido	Gerry	Segment: The Family Man
1973	Dalmas	Rojack	
1974	The Cars That Ate Paris	Metcalfe	
1974	Applause Please	Various characters	Short film
1975	The Firm Man	Managing director	
1975	The True Story of Eskimo Nell	Deadeye Dick	
1975	The Great Macarthy	Stan	
1975	Pure Shit	Dr. Harry Wolf	
1976	The Trespassers	Publisher	
1979	Dimboola	Vivian Worcester-Jones	
1980	A Wild Ass of a Man	James Muldoon	TV movie
1982	A Shifting Dreaming	William 'Nugget' Morton	Documentary film
1985	The Coca-Cola Kid	Frank Hunter	
1988	As Time Goes By	Joe Bogart – The Alien	
1990	A Stretch of the Imagination	Monk O'Neill	TV movie
1991	A Woman's Tale	Billy's Son-in-Law	
1996	Lust and Revenge	Art Critic	
2003	The Ball	John Howard, Prime Minister	Short film
2006	Wil	The Therapist	

=== Television ===
Year	Film	Role	Notes
1974	This Love Affair	Harry	TV series – 2 episodes
1974	Flash Nick from Jindavick	Inspector Hare/Mayor of Dubbo/Gerry the Fireman	TV series – 3 episodes
1975	Homicide	Lennie	TV series – 1 episode
1975	Tandarra	Dr. Roland Clancy	Miniseries – 1 episode
1977	Bluey	John Clancy	TV series – 1 episode
1980	Lawson's Mates		TV series – 1 episode
1980	Spring & Fall	Charlie	TV series – 1 episode
1978–1981	Tickled Pink	Willeke/Uncle/Bill	TV series – 4 episodes
1983	Home	Barney	Children's TV series – 2 episodes
1984–1985	The Gillies Report	Various characters	Sketch show – 14 episodes
1986	The Gillies Republic	Various characters	Sketch show – 6 episodes
1992	Gillies and Company	Various characters	Sketch show
1995	Blue Heelers	Bill Foster	TV series – 1 episode
2000	All Saints	Ian Benson	TV series – 1 episode
2003	Welcher & Welcher	Larry	Sitcom – 1 episode
2012	House Husbands	Noel	TV series – 1 episode
2020	Bloom	Archbishop Gibson	TV series – 3 episodes

== Theatre ==
Year	Film	Role	Notes
1962	The School for Scandal		University of Melbourne
1964	Summer of the Seventeenth Doll	Barney	University of Melbourne
1964	Love’s Best Doctor		Union Theatre
1964	Endgame		Union Theatre
1970	The Hero Rises Up		
1970	Knuckle		APG at Pram Factory
1970–1971	Marvellous Melbourne		APG at Pram Factory
1971	The Feet of Daniel Mannix	Mr Greensleeves	APG at Pram Factory
1972	He Can Swagger Sitting Down	George Wallace	APG at Pram Factory
1973	Dimboola	Bayonet	APG at Pram Factory
1973	The Dumb Waiter	Gus	APG at Pram Factory
1973	The Dragon Lady’s Revenge		APG at Pram Factory
1974	Housey		
1974	River Jordan		APG at Pram Factory
1974	The Architect and the Emperor of Assyria		APG at Pram Factory
1974	On Yer Marx	Groucho Marx	APG at Pram Factory
1974	Who		APG at Pram Factory
1975	Smoking is a Health Hazard	Ivan Ivanovich Nyukhin	APG at Pram Factory
1975	Bedfellows	Paul Cummins	APG at Pram Factory
1975	The Money Show		APG at Carlton Festival
1975	The Department	Robbie	Marian Street Theatre
1975–1977	The Hills Family Show	Fitzroy Hills	APG at Pram Factory
1976	Yours for the Masking		APG at Pram Factory
1976	A Toast to Melba	Oscar Wilde, Buffalo Bill, Pietro Cecchi & Truth Editor	APG at National Theatre & Adelaide Festival
1976	A Stretch of the Imagination	Monk O’Neill	APG at Pram Factory
1976	Knuckle		APG at Pram Factory
1978	The Ship’s Whistle		APG at Pram Factory
1979	Beware of Imitations	Sir Wilfred McLuckie	APG at Pram Factory
1979	Marsupials		MTC at Russell Street Theatre
1979–1980	Traitors		APG at Nimrod
1980	Clouds		Nimrod
1980–1981	Scanlan	Professor Scanlan	Universal Theatre, Nimrod & La Boite
1980–1981	Smoking is a Health Hazard	Ivan Ivanovich Nyukhin	Phillip Street Theatre & Universal Theatre
1981	Squirts	Various characters including Malcolm Fraser	STCSA at Universal Theatre & Playhouse
1982	A Night with the Right	Various characters	Nimrod
1982	Welcome to the Bright World		Nimrod
1983	Accidental Death of an Anarchist		Athenaeum Theatre
1987	A Chorus of Disapproval	Dafydd	MTC
1987–1988	The Department	Robbie	Australian Elizabethan Theatre Trust at Seymour Centre
1990	Allo Allo	René	State Theatre & Her Majesty's Theatre
1990–1991	A Stretch of the Imagination	Monk O’Neill	MTC at Russell Street Theatre
1992	Fiddler on the Roof	Tevye	Opera Australia
1993	In Two Minds		Theatre Royal
1993	The Beaux’ Stratagem	Foigard	MTC
1993	Scrooge, The Musical	The Ghost of Christmas Present	Princess Theatre
1994	The Sisters Rosensweig	Mervyn Kant	MTC
1995	Three Birds Alighting on a Field		
1995	Lady Windermere's Fan	Lord Augustus Lorton	MTC
1996	Gillies Live at the Club Republic	Various characters	Civic Theatre
1996	Little Shop of Horrors		Enmore Theatre
1996	Competitive Tenderness	Brian	Playbox
1997	After the Ball	Ron Macrae	QTC at Suncorp Theatre
1997	Run for Your Wife		Civic Theatre
1998	Misalliance	John Tarleton	MTC
1998	The Club	Ted Parker	MTC
1998	Noises Off		Civic Theatre
1999	Happy Days - The Arena Mega Musical	Howard Cunningham	Paul Dainty
1999	The Merry Widow	Miko Zeta	Essgee Entertainment at Sydney Lyric
2000	A Couple of Blaguards		Ensemble Theatre
2000	Your Dreaming: The Prime Minister’s Cultural Convention	Poets, Pontificanfs & Ex-Patriots	Playbox (A Centenary of Federation Event)
2003	The Dock Brief	Wilfred Morgenhall	Ensemble Theatre
2003–2004	Last of the Red Hot Lovers	Barney	Hit Productions at Q Theatre
2004	What the Butler Saw	Dr Rance	Belvoir St Theatre
2003, 2006	Babes in the Wood	Tía Avarice	Merlyn Theatre
2004–2005	The Big Con	Various characters	ANZ Pavilion Arts Centre
2005	Love Letters	Andrew Makepeace Ladd III	Parade Theatre, NIDA
2005–2006	A Couple of Blaguards	Malachy McCourt	York Theatre
2006	A Hard God		
2007	Dimboola		Malthouse Theatre
2007, 2008	Heroes	Henri	QTC at Cremorne Theatre
2008	No Country for Old PMs: An Evening with Max Gillies	Himself	Noosa Longweekend Festival
2009	The Man from Mukinupin	Eek Perkins	MTC / Company B
2009–2010	Godzone	Various characters	MTC at Sumner Theatre
2011	Much Ado About Nothing	Dogberry	STC
2012	The Seed	Brian Maloney	MTC
2013	The Haunting of David Gartrell	David Gartrell	Straightjacket Productions
2014–2015	Once Were Leaders: An Evening with Max Gillies	Various characters	Wander Productions
2018	Krapp's Last Tape	Krapp	Fortyfivedownstairs
2019	Senior Moments	Various characters	Return Fire Productions
2021–2023	Mono: A Three-Person One-Man Show	Various characters	Bunbury Productions
