= Dead Easy =

Dead Easy may refer to:

- Dead Easy (1970 film), a 1970 Australian film
- Dead Easy (1982 film), a 1982 Australian film
