= Nothing Like Experience =

- Directed by: Peter Carmody
- Written by: Peter Carmody
- Starring: Bill Garner; John Romeril; Martin Phelan; Tony Rudd
- Cinematography: Doug Hobbs; Nigel Buesst; Gary Vaughan; Dave Downey; Kevin Anderson
- Production company: Melbourne University Film Society
- Release date: 1970
- Running time: 50 mins
- Country: Australia
- Language: English

Nothing Like Experience is a 1970 Australian film made by Melbourne University Film Society about three students at Melbourne University. It was part of the "Carlton wave" of Australian filmmaking. The film was commissioned by the SRC and the Council of the Student Union.

== Premise ==
A comedy about the 1969 University Arts Festival in Melbourne, featuring three student archetypes: the Cynic (John Romeril), the Enthusiast (Bill Garner), and the Schizoid (Marty Phelan).
