= Dead Easy (1970 film) =

- Directed by: Nigel Buesst
- Written by: Nigel Buesst
- Produced by: Nigel Buesst
- Starring: Peter Carmody
- Cinematography: Vince Monton
- Edited by: Nigel Buesst
- Release date: June 1970
- Running time: 53 mins
- Country: Australia
- Language: English

Dead Easy is an Australian film released on 1 June 1970.

== Plot ==
A student of criminology is completing a thesis on Melbourne mass murderers. With the aid of a German professor he visits the scenes of the crimes of Frederick Deeming, Norman List, Arnold Sodeman and Edward Leonski and reconstructs them. One day the students visits the professor and sees him attacked by two strangers. The professor knifes one of the men.

== Cast ==
- Peter Carmody as the student
- Kurt Beimelas the professor
- Anna Raknes as the girlfriend
- Peter Cummins as the stranger
- David Car as a stranger
- Martin Phelan as cameraman
- Brian Davies as friend
- Bruce Spence as friend
- Shirley Carr
- Alan Finney

== Production ==
The film was shot in January 1970 in and around Melbourne. It received a limited release.
