= Nigel Buesst =

Australian film director (1938–2024)

- Born: 30 April 1938; Melbourne, Victoria, Australia
- Died: 27 December 2024 (aged 86)
- Education: University of Melbourne
- Occupations: Filmmaker, film director, educator
- Years active: 1963–2018

Nigel Buesst (30 April 1938 – 27 December 2024) was an Australian filmmaker from Melbourne. After graduating B.Com in 1960 from Melbourne University he headed overseas to London and worked as an assistant editor at Shepparton Studios.

On returning to Melbourne in 1962 he worked for some months at the ABC's Ripponlea newsroom, and freelanced as a cameraman on various productions. He also started directing his own films, beginning with “Fun Radio” in 1963.

After the success of his film "Rise and Fall of Squizzy Taylor" he began teaching at the Swinburne University of Technology (1970-1984) while continuing to make films on a diverse range of subjects.

He was also a co-founder and the artistic director of the St Kilda Film Festival from 1986 to 1990.

Buesst has been described as "a living legend of Melbourne's film scene" and was a figure in the "Carlton wave" of Australian filmmaking. He died in December 2024, at the age of 86.

== Select credits ==
Director on all titles, unless otherwise noted.

- Fun Radio (1963)
- Dancing Class (Dir: Tom Cowan 1964) – photography
- The Twentieth (1966)
- The Making of a Gallery, NGV (1967) – photography
- The Rise and Fall of Squizzy Taylor (1969)
- Nothing Like Experience (1970) – photography
- Bonjour Balwyn (1970)
- Dead Easy (1970)
- Destruction of St Patrick's College (1971)
- Come Out Fighting (1973)
- Jacka VC (Dir: Ross Cooper 1977) – photography
- Glenn's Story (Dir: Arnold Zable 1979) – photography
- Jazz Scrapbook (1983)
- Compo (1989)
- Benny Featherstone (Prince Good Fellows) (1996)
- Black Sheep Gather No Moss (1997)
- The Loved One - Gerry Humphrys (2000)
- Talking With Ade (2000)
- Carlton + Godard = Cinema (2003)
- Darwin Harbour (2010)
- Ballarat Jazz Convention (2015)
- Point Lonsdale Plaque Unveiling (2018) – editor
