= Lawson's Mates =

Australian television series

Lawson's Mates is an Australian television series based on Henry Lawson stories adapted by Cliff Green, first broadcast on the ABC in 1980.

Green's scripts were published as Lawson's Mates: six television plays by Hyland House. The script of the episode "Dave Regan and Party" received an AWGIE Award for television adaptation.

== Cast ==
=== Main cast ===
- Steve Bisley
- George Mallaby as Jack Henright
- Sigrid Thornton as Hannah
- Graeme Blundell
- Tony Bonner as Joe Wilson
- Bud Tingwell
- Max Gillies
- Gerard Maguire as Jock
- Darius Perkins as Jim Bullock
- Ian Gilmour as Jim
- Michael Carman as Dave Regan
- Monica Maughan as Mrs. Spicer
- Barbara Llewellyn as Mary Wilson
- Rosie Sturgess as Ma Middleton
- John Wood as One Eyed Bogan
- Sean Myers
- Maureen Edwards

=== Guest cast ===
- Bud Tingwell
- Frank Wilson
- Ian Gilmour as Jim
