= The Great Macarthy =

- DVD reissue
- Directed by: David Baker
- Written by: John Romeril
- Based on: A Salute to the Great McCarthy by Barry Oakley
- Produced by: David Baker; Richard Brennan
- Starring: John Jarratt; Barry Humphries; Judy Morris
- Cinematography: Bruce McNaughton
- Music by: Bruce Smeaton
- Production company: Stoney Creek Films
- Distributed by: Seven Keys
- Release date: 7 August 1975
- Running time: 90 minutes
- Country: Australia
- Language: English
- Budget: A$250,000

The Great Macarthy is a 1975 Australian comedy film about football. It was an adaptation of the 1970 novel A Salute to the Great McCarthy by Barry Oakley. It stars John Jarratt as the title character (in his film debut) as a local footballer playing for Kyneton, who is signed up (or more appropriately, kidnapped) by the South Melbourne Football Club (now Sydney Swans). It also stars Barry Humphries and Judy Morris. It was released at a time of resurgence in Australian cinema but was not very successful despite its high-profile cast, including many well-known Aussie Rules personalities.

== Plot ==
Macarthy is a country football player who is kidnapped by the South Melbourne Football Club and made a star player in the city. The Club Chairman, Colonel Ball-Miller, gives Macarthy a job in one of his companies and makes him attend night school. He is seduced by his English teacher, Miss Russell, and has an affair with Ball-Miller's daughter, Andrea.

Macarthy and Andrea get married but then divorce. Macarthy goes on strike to claim the family fortune.

== Cast ==
- John Jarratt as MacArthy
- Judy Morris as Miss Russell
- Kate Fitzpatrick as Andrea
- Sandy Macgregor as Vera
- Barry Humphries as Colonel Ball-Miller
- John Frawley as Webster
- Colin Croft as Tranter
- Chris Haywood as Warburton
- Colin Drake as Ackerman
- Ron Frazer as Twentyman
- Max Gillies as Stan
- Dennis Miller as MacGuinness
- Lou Richards as Lou Arnold
- Jack Dyer as Jack Diehard
- Jim Bowles as Les
- Bruce Spence as Bill Dean
- Peter Cummins as Rerk
- Vivean Gray as Mrs. Thompson
- Tina Bursill as Miss Deevil
- Doug Elliot as Team Manager
- Frank Wilson as Mayer
- Maurie Fields as Company Director
- Bob Davis as Broadcaster (with Lou Richards)
- Jon Finlayson as Vincent
- Terry Norris as Vera's dad
- Walter Pym

== Production ==
David Baker was an emerging director who was interested in Barry Oakley's novel. Richard Brennan optioned it for him and they agreed to make the film together, hiring playwright John Romeril to do the adaptation. According to Brennan, Romeril's second draft was "fantastic" but later drafts included too much sex and slapstick to make it more like other successful Australian films at the time such as The Adventures of Barry McKenzie and Alvin Purple.

Phillip Adams later claimed he always knew the film would struggle "because of its idiosyncratic and complex nature".

The film was shot in mid 1974. Half the budget was provided by the Australian Film Development Corporation. As he looked like Jarratt, South Melbourne player Garry Scott doubled for the star in the match long shots.

== Release ==
The film performed poorly critically and at the box office.
