= Locusts and Wild Honey =

- Written by: Everett de Roche
- Directed by: Douglas Sharp
- Starring: Frank Gallacher; Beverly Blankenship; Tim Robertson; Julia Blake; Jane Norris; Sarah Norris
- Country of origin: Australia
- Original language: English
- No. of episodes: 3 x 1 hour

Production
- Producer: Oscar Whitbread

Original release
- Network: ABC
- Release: 13 April – 27 April 1980

Locusts and Wild Honey is a 1980 Australian mini series about a small town where they spot UFOs.

== Cast ==
The series starred Julia Blake and her two real-life daughters, Jane and Sarah Norris, as her on-screen daughters who are abducted by aliens.

- Frank Gallacher – Jan
- Beverly Blankenship – Anna
- Jane Norris – Nikki
- Sarah Norris – Tassy
- Tim Robertson – Reverend Charles
- Julia Blake – Dr. Fletcher
