= Bachelor Girl (film) =

- Written by: Rivka Hartman
- Directed by: Rivka Hartman
- Starring: Lyn Pierse; Kim Gyngell; Bruce Spence
- Country of origin: Australia
- Original language: English

Production
- Producer: Ned Lander
- Running time: 83 minutes
- Production company: Yarra Bank Film Pty Ltd
- Budget: A$690,000

Original release
- Release: 7 February 1988

Bachelor Girl is a 1988 Australian TV movie.

== Plot ==
Dorothy Bloom is a 32-year-old single soap opera writer planning a long, quiet weekend in Melbourne. Her Aunt Esther wants her to meet a gynecologist but instead she runs into Karl Stanton, an old friend from uni days.

== Cast ==
- Lyn Pierse as Dot Bloom
- Kym Gyngell as Karl Stanton
- Jan Friedl as Helen Carter
- Bruce Spence as Alistair Dredge Jr
- Doug Tremlett as Charles
- Ruth Yaffe as Aunt Esther
- Jack Perry as Uncle Isaac
- Monica Maughan as Sybil
- Tim Robertson as Grant
- Mark Minchinton as Gazza
- Christine Mahoney as Jenny
- Denis Moore as Bert
- Lynda Gibson as Receptionist
- Sue Jones as Audrey

== Production ==
It was financed with the assistance of Film Victoria and the Australian Film Commission.

== Reception ==
The TV critic from The Age called the film "wonderfully whimsical. A sort of Aussie Heartburn, it combines liberal helpings of Jewish philosophy and humour, off-beat animation, accelerated footage and delicious satire."
