= A Stretch of the Imagination =

- Written by: Jack Hibberd
- Characters: Monk O'Neil
- Original language: English
- Genre: Drama

Premiere
- Date premiered: 8 March 1972
- Place premiered: The Pram Factory, Carlton

A Stretch of the Imagination is an Australian play by Jack Hibberd. It was one of the most significant new plays of the Australian drama revival of the early 1970s.

== History ==
A long monodrama, A Stretch of the Imagination, is regarded by most connoisseurs as Hibberd’s finest work, embodying a radical advance in the character of Australian theatre, embracing and remoulding as it does many of the strong strands in theatrical modernism.

In 1976 it was performed by Max Gillies of the APG (for which he won a Theatre Australia Award). In 1990 it was reimagined as a TV movie, where Gillies reprised his role.

It was the first Australian play to be staged in China (in Mandarin) with a famous Chinese actor, Wei Zongwan, as Monk. This play has enjoyed productions in the United States, Germany and New Zealand. In 2010 it was performed in London by Mark Little, a winner of the prestigious Laurence Olivier Award.
