= Happy Days - The Arena Mega Musical =

Australian musical

Happy Days - The Arena Mega Musical is an Australian musical that is a spinoff of the USA sitcom Happy Days.

Directed by David Gilmore and produced by Paul Dainty it debuted in Sydney in October 1999, subsequently playing in Melbourne, Adelelaide, Perth and Brisbane. The musical had a preview staging at the Newcastle Entertainment Centre on 7 October 1999 before its official opening on the 15th at Sydney's SuperDome.

The musical was met with mixed to poor reviews. Paul LePetit of the Sunday Telegraph wrote that it was "a relentlessly bright but banal night. Plenty of colour and movement, but little plot and a lot of over-acting." The Sun Herald's Colin Rose said that the "clichéd storyline, as old as the hills, was merely an excuse to play the great hits (27 of them) from rock'n'roll's heyday, songs such as Jailhouse Rock, Great Balls Of Fire and Johnny B Goode." Chelsea Clarke writing in the Daily Telegraph praised the " dazzling costumes, excellent staging, bright choreography and stunning use of the impressive lighting rig." but said that from "a creative point of view, though, it lacks a great deal of what made other arena spectaculars such as Grease so successful". The Australians Stephen Brooks writes "what a shame the actual Happy Days element of the show doesn't fare as well." Ara Jansen praised the show in The West Australian, "If Happy Days doesn't put a smile on your face, then you're in need of therapy."

An Original Cast Recording album was released and was nominated for the 2000 ARIA Award for Best Cast or Show Album.

== Original Australian cast ==
- Tom Bosley - Special Guest
- Darren Coggan - Richie Cunningham
- Rod Dunbar - Understudy
- Rebecca Gibney - Miss Frost
- Max Gillies - Howard Cunningham
- Pippa Grandison - Joanie Cunningham
- Matt Hetherington - Potsie Weber
- Wendy Hughes - Marion Cunningham
- Craig Ilott - Ralph Malph
- Craig McLachlan - The Fonz
- Doug Parkinson - Delvecchio
- Jon Stevens - Frank
- Jo Beth Taylor - Laura
- Human Nature - The Naturals

== Original cast recording track listing ==
1. Happy Days - The Company
2. Trouble - Jon Stevens
3. Long Tall Sally - Matt Hetherington, Craig Ilott, Darren Coggan & Pippa Grandison
4. Born Too Late - Pippa Grandison
5. Great Balls of Fire - Craig McLachlan & Rebecca Gibney
6. Dream Lover - Darren Coggan
7. Poison Ivy - Human Nature
8. Unchained Melody - Doug Parkinson
9. A Teenager in Love - Human Nature
10. Rip It Up - Jon Stevens
11. C'mon Everybody - Craig McLachlan
12. At the Hop - The Company
13. Stand by Me - Jo Beth Taylor & Darren Coggan
14. Johnny B. Goode - Craig McLachlan & Darren Coggan
15. You Don't Own Me - Jo Beth Taylor
16. Stay - Human Nature
17. Tell Him - Jo Beth Taylor & Pippa Grandison
18. Lucille - Doug Parkinson
19. Fever - Rebecca Gibney
20. Jailhouse Rock - Jon Stevens
21. Save the Last Dance for Me - Craig Ilott, Darren Coggan & Matt Hetherington
22. Shake You Outta My Head - Human Nature
23. Heartbreak Hotel - Craig McLachlan
24. Rock and Roll Is Here to Stay - The Company
