= Dalmas (film) =

- Directed by: Bert Deling
- Written by: Bert Deling
- Produced by: Bert Deling
- Starring: Peter White
- Cinematography: Sasha Trikojus
- Production company: Apogee Films
- Release date: November 1973
- Running time: 103 mins
- Country: Australia
- Language: English
- Budget: A$10,000

Dalmas is a 1973 Australian film directed by Bert Deling. One critic wrote that "with Dave Jones’ Yackety Yack [the film] constitutes the clearest presence of Godard in Australian cinema."

== Plot ==
An ex-cop, Pete Dalmas, is pursuing a drug runner Mr Big. He visits another ex-cop, Rojack, who has become a drug addict. Rojack gives him a lead to a drug dealer called the Plastic Man. He follows the Plastic Man to a seaside camp and the film turns into a film about the making of the film, with the director and actors discussing filmmaking and drugs.

== Cast ==
- Peter Whittle as Dalmas
- Peter Cummins as Plastic Man
- Max Gillies as Rojack
- John Duigan as film director
- Roger Ward as policeman
- Tribe

== Production ==
The film was shot over four years. Half the budget was provided by the Experimental Film and Television Fund.

Many people who worked on it were associated with the Pram Factory Theatre in Melbourne.

== Release ==
The movie was not widely screened; however, it was given a commercial season at the Australia Twin Cinema in Melbourne.
