= Margot Hilton =

British-born Australian author (born 1947)

Margot Hilton (born 1947) is a British-born Australian author who also writes under the pen name of F.F. Piano.

== Biography ==
Hilton was born in London and graduated from the University of Leeds with a BA English Hons (1971) and an MA Drama & Theatre Arts (1972). She visited Australia in 1974 becoming an Australian citizen in 1983. She worked as the inaugural Drama Officer for the Victorian Ministry for the Arts, a writer on TV Channel Ten's Young Doctors, the Executive Officer for the Australian Society of Authors, the inaugural Executive Secretary for the Victorian Premier's Literature Awards, a Publicity Manager for Angus & Robertson, a segment producer & writer of specialist guest segments for TV Channel Ten's daily Til Ten with Joan McInnes, on which she also presented on-air book reviews and as a project officer for the Literature Board of the Australia Council. She has written book reviews and articles for magazines and newspapers, film and TV scripts, speeches and songs, as well as several books.

She was married for 18 years to Graeme Blundell, with whom she has two children. She co-wrote an unauthorised autobiography of Brett Whiteley with him, published in 1996, which initiated the breakdown of their marriage. During this period, in response to Blundell's serial adultery, as Graeme Blundell put it, she "...ran off with (Michael Driscoll) the person that, 20 years earlier, Whiteley's then wife Wendy Whiteley had also run off with." She has not remarried and lives in Sydney.

She joined the Sydney Jewish Museum as a volunteer guide and writer in 1998.

== Bibliography ==
- Women on Men, Penguin Books, Sydney, 1987 ISBN 0-14-010324-4
- Jokes About Blokes, Angus and Robertson, Sydney, 1990 ISBN 978-0-207-16811-6
- Whiteley: An Unauthorised Life, with Graeme Blundell, Pan MacMillan, Sydney, 1996, ISBN 0-7329-0798-5
- "Short Plays for the Australian Stage:" Potiphar's Wife by Margot Hilton, Volume 1, Ed Leonard Radic, Yackandandah Playscripts, 1987, ISBN 0-86805-060-1
- "I Am A Survivor" By Alex Lowy with Margot Hilton, Sydney Jewish Museum, 2011, ISBN 978-0-9805458-8-3
- "From Greenfield Street to Golders Green" by Kate Hilton with Margot Hilton, Sydney Jewish Museum, 2011, ISBN
