= John Romeril =

Australian playwright

John Henry Romeril AM (born 1945) is an Australian playwright. He has written more than 70 plays for theatre, film, radio, and television, and is best known for his 1975 play The Floating World.

== Early life and education ==
John Henry Romeril was born in 1945 and grew up in Melbourne, living in Moorabbin until 1966. He attended Bentleigh West State School, Brighton Tech., and Brighton High Schools, and then undertook a BA (Hons) at Monash University, graduating in 1970 with majors in English Literature and Politics.

== Career ==
Over the course of his career, Romeril wrote plays for theatre, film, radio, and television, including stage, musicals, puppet theatre, pantomimes, and street theatre.

In 1968 he became involved with La Mama Theatre, which had been established in that year by Betty Burstall. In 1969 a group involved with the theatre founded the Australian Performing Group (APG) in 1970 established the Pram Factory. The APG went on to perform many of Romeril's plays, which were performed at the Pram Factory. Romeril also worked collaboratively with other APG writers, including Jack Hibberd and Tim Robertson.

His first plays, I Don't Know Who To Feel Sorry For (1969) and Chicago, Chicago (1970) were written while he was still a student. In 1972, Romeril wrote an episode of the anthology series A Time for Love titled "The Best of Mates".

In 1972, Romeril co-wrote a one-act play for four actors called Bastardy, based on the life of the main actor in the first production of the play, Jack Charles. Premiering on 23 August 1972, Charles played the main character at the season at the Pram Factory, with Peter Cummins, Jude Kuring, and Tim Robertson taking the other three parts. Charles plays a cat burglar who was struggling to get over his drug habit. The production was directed by Bruce Spence. Charles has taken pains to point out that the word is bastardy, not bastardry, Romeril having chosen the title because Charles "lived a life of buggery and bastardy in the Box Hill Boys' Home", and also referring to the fact that Charles was fatherless. The script of the play was published in 1982 by Yackandandah Playscripts, and a documentary film of the same title observing seven years of Charles' life, made by Amiel Courtin-Wilson, was released in 2008.

The Floating World (1975) is his most admired play, described by one critic as "a pioneering drama in the context of the predominantly Anglo-Celtic orientation of the APG's theatrical output".

His later work is placed firmly in the context of Australia being part of the Asia Pacific region, including Japan.

He co-wrote the film script for One Night the Moon with Rachel Perkins, released in 2001.

== Themes and style ==
Romeril is known for collaborating when creating his works, in a way that allows many others to contribute to the work.

His plays have examined many influences on Australian society, such as war, American cultural imperialism and national politics.

His style has been described as improvisational and musical, and is influenced by Brecht. His works frequently require audience participation, as is seen in the improvisational work Kelly Dance, where members of the audience members are invited to dance on the stage with the actors.

== Awards and recognition ==
Romeril has been a writer in residence with Jigsaw Theatre Company in Canberra, and Troupe Theatre in Adelaide.

Other awards and honours include:

- 1976: Winner of the inaugural Canada-Australia Literary Award
- 1988: Victorian Government Drama Fellowship
- 1993: Kenneth Myer Medallion for the Performing Arts
- 2003: State Library Victoria Fellowship
- 2003: Australia Council Literature Board Fellowship
- 2003: Inaugural Australian National Playwrights Centre (later merged with Playworks to form PlayWriting Australia) Award
- 2006–2007: University of New South Wales Literary Scholarship
- 2008: Patrick White Award
- 2013: Lifetime Achievement award by the Sydney Theatre Awards
- 2014: Australia Council grants and awards
- 2016: AWGIE Award, Dorothy Crawford Award for Outstanding Contribution to the Profession
- 2017: Member of the Order of Australia (AM) in the 2017 Queen's Birthday Honours for "significant service to the performing arts as a playwright and screenwriter, and to theatre companies and education"

Some of his works have also been awarded, including Tokyo Henry (Playbox Asialink Playwrighting Competition, 2003) and Miss Tanaka (Nick Enright Prize for Playwriting at the NSW Premier's Literary Awards, 2002).

== Selected works ==
- A Nameless Concern (1968)
- Kitchen Table (1968)
- The Man from Chicago (1969)
- Marvellous Melbourne (1970)
- Mrs Thally F (1971)
- I Don't Know Who to Feel Sorry For (1973)
- The Floating World (1975)
- Bastardy, with Uncle Jack Charles (first performed 1972; published 1982)
- Jonah (1985)
- Kelly Dance (1986)
- Legends (1986)
- Definitely Not the Last: A rock'n'roll fable (1989)
- Lost Weekend (1989)
- Black Cargo (1991)
- Love Suicides (1997)
- Kate 'N' Shiner (1998)
- Miss Tanaka (2001)
- One Night the Moon, with Rachel Perkins (2001)
