= Darren Coggan =

Australian musical actor

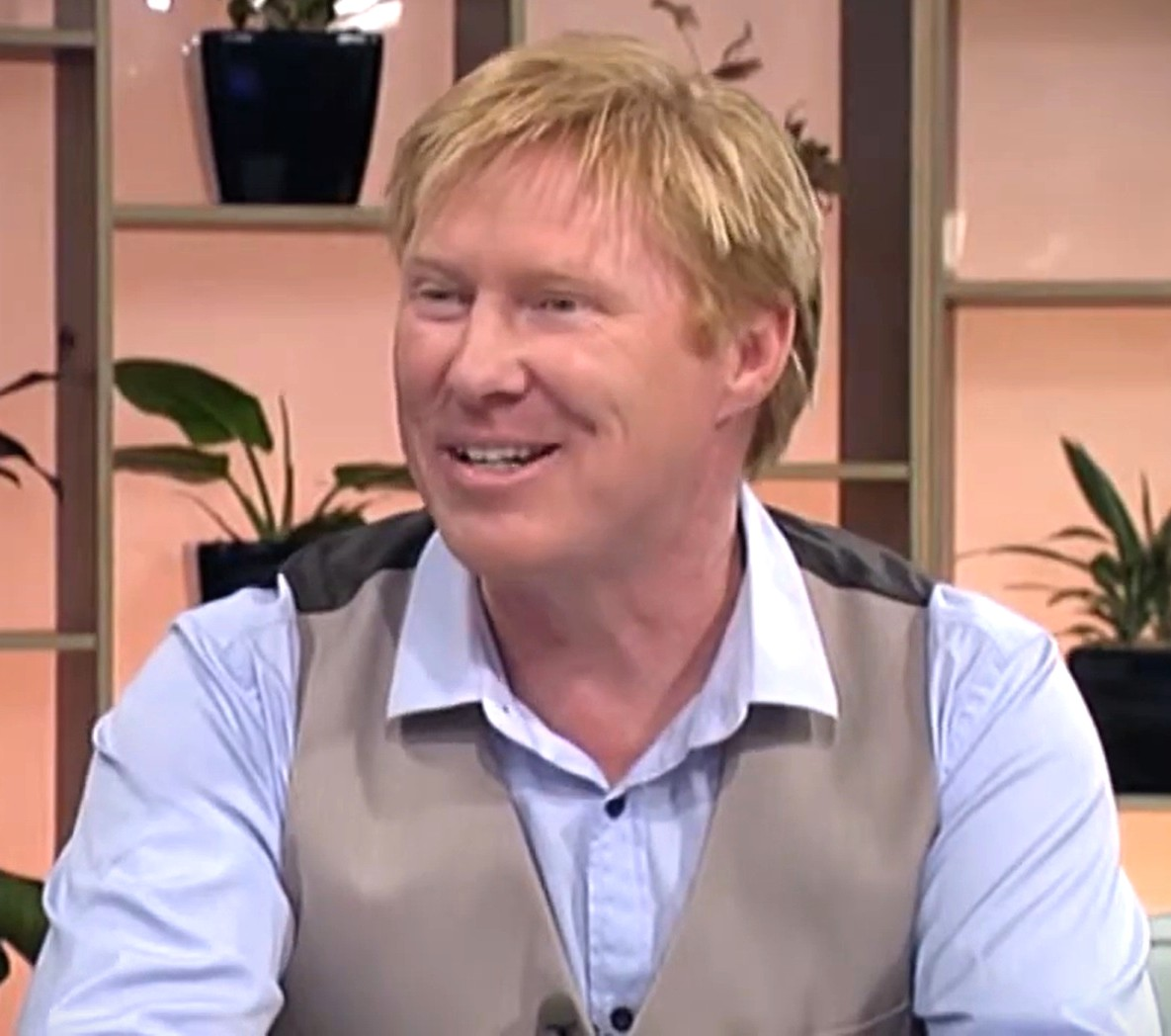
- Coggan in 2018
- Born: Glen Innes
- Occupation(s): Actor, Musician

Darren Coggan is an Australian musician and actor.

Coggan was born in Glen Innes, New South Wales circa 1973, before his family moved to Wagga Wagga in 1980.

Coggan began his career as a country music performer and was nominated for five Golden Guitars in 1998. In 1999 he got the role of Richie Cunningham in the touring show Happy Days - The Arena Mega Musical. In 2001 he toured with Grease the Mega Musical playing both Teen Angel and Vince Fontaine. In 2006 he debuted the musical theatre show Moonshadows based on the life and works of Cat Stevens followed up by another tribute show Peace Train - The Cat Stevens Story.
