= The Cars That Ate Paris =

1974 film by Peter Weir

- Australian film poster
- Directed by: Peter Weir
- Screenplay by: Peter Weir
- Story by: Peter Weir; Keith Gow; Piers Davies
- Produced by: Hal and Jim McElroy
- Starring: John Meillon; Terry Camilleri; Kevin Miles
- Cinematography: John McLean
- Edited by: Wayne LeClos
- Music by: Bruce Smeaton
- Production companies: Australian Film Development Corporation; Royce Smeal Film Productions; Salt Pan Films
- Distributed by: British Empire Films
- Release dates: 15 June 1974 (Sydney Film Festival); 10 October 1974 (Australia)
- Running time: 88 minutes 74 minutes (US cut)
- Country: Australia
- Language: English
- Budget: $250,000

The Cars That Ate Paris is a 1974 Australian horror comedy film, produced by twin brothers Hal and Jim McElroy and directed by Peter Weir. It was his first feature film, and was also based on an original story he had written. Shot mostly in the rural town of Sofala, New South Wales, the film is set in the fictional town of Paris in which most of the inhabitants appear to be directly or indirectly involved in profiting from the results of car accidents. The film is considered part of the Australian New Wave genre.

== Plot ==
An urban couple drive through the countryside in what seems to be an advertisement. They are interrupted by a fatal accident. The rural Australian town of Paris survives by causing accidents when motorists drive through town. Townspeople collect items from the luggage of deceased passengers, while any survivors are taken to the town hospital, where they are given lobotomies with power tools and kept as "veggies" for medical experiments by the earnest town surgeon. The young men of the town salvage and modify the wrecked vehicles into a variety of strange-looking cars, destined for destruction.

When Arthur Waldo (Terry Camilleri) and his older brother, George Waldo (Rick Scully), drive through Paris, they meet with an accident that kills George. Arthur is spared and looked after by the Mayor of Paris, Len Kelly (John Meillon), who invites Arthur to stay in his home as one of his family; his two young daughters have been "adopted" after being orphaned in motor accidents in the town.

Arthur unsuccessfully attempts to leave Paris, but due to a previous incident where he was exonerated of manslaughter for running over an elderly pedestrian, he has lost his confidence to drive and there does not seem to be any public transport. Mayor Len gives Arthur a job at the local hospital as a medical orderly. Beneath the idyllic rural paradise of Paris is a festering feud between the young men of the town, who live for their modified vehicles with which they terrorise the town, and the older generation. When one of the hoons damages the Mayor's property and breaks a statue of an Aboriginal Australian, the older men of the town burn the guilty driver's car as he is held down.

The Mayor appoints Arthur the town parking inspector, complete with brassard and Army bush jacket, which further irritates the young men. The situation reaches a boiling point on the night of the town's annual Pioneers Ball, a fancy dress and costume party. What was planned to be a "car gymkhana" by the young men turns into an assault on the town, where both sides attack each other, killing several of the residents. Arthur regains his driving confidence when he repeatedly drives the Mayor's car into one of the hoons who has tried to run him down. Arthur drives away as the town's other residents leave Paris in the night.

== Cast ==
- John Meillon as Mayor
- Terry Camilleri as Arthur Waldo
- Kevin Miles as Dr Midland
- Rick Scully as George
- Max Gillies as Metcalf
- Danny Adcock as Policeman
- Bruce Spence as Charlie
- Kevin Golsby as Insurance man
- Chris Haywood as Darryl
- Peter Armstrong as Gorman
- Joe Burrow as Ganger
- Deryck Barnes as Smedley
- Edward Howell as Tringham
- Max Phipps as Reverend Mulray
- Melissa Jaffer as Beth
- Tim Robertson as Les
- Herbie Nelson as Man in house
- Patrick Ward

== Production ==
Peter Weir got the idea to make the film while driving through Europe where road signs on the main French roads diverted him into what he perceived as strange little villages. It originally started as a comedy to star Grahame Bond but later evolved. Piers Davies and Keith Gow also had input. He then took the movie to the McElroy brothers, who had previously worked in a large variety of positions on a number of films. Most of the budget came from the Australian Film Development Corporation with additional funds from Royce Smeal Film Productions in Sydney. Shooting began in October 1973, primarily on location in Sofala, New South Wales.

== Release ==
The film had its world premiere at the Sydney Film Festival in June 1974.

The movie struggled to find an audience in Australia, changing distributors and using advertising campaigns that pitched it alternately as a horror film and an art film. However it has become a cult film. By 1980, $112,500 had been returned to the producers.

The producers unsuccessfully attempted to negotiate an American release for the film with Roger Corman after it was shown with great success at the Cannes Film Festival. Shortly afterwards Corman recruited Paul Bartel to direct his Death Race 2000; Bartel had not seen The Cars That Ate Paris but he was aware that Corman had a print of the film. It eventually received an American release in 1976 by New Line Cinema under the title The Cars That Eat People with added on narration and other changes.

In 1992, it was adapted as a musical theatre work by Chamber Made Opera.

Director Stanley Kubrick included The Cars That Ate Paris on the list of his 93 favourite films.

== Reception ==
As of 1 June 2026, the film holds a 67% "Fresh" rating on Rotten Tomatoes out of 18 reviews. The 10 October 2024 marked the 50-year anniversary since the movie's cinema release and decades later the movie continues to shape the tropes of Ozploitation filming in both "profound and surprising ways".

== See also ==
- Cinema of Australia
