= The Firm Man =

- Directed by: John Duigan
- Written by: John Duigan
- Produced by: John Duigan
- Starring: Peter Cummins
- Cinematography: Sasha Trikojus
- Edited by: Tony Patterson
- Release date: 7 March 1975
- Running time: 100 minutes
- Country: Australia
- Language: English
- Budget: A$15,000

The Firm Man is a 1975 film which was the first directed by John Duigan.

== Plot ==
Gerald Baxter, a middle aged businessman, starts a new job at a company called the Firm where his only jobs are collecting occasional messages. Gerald becomes bored and alienated from his life and wife. He befriends a girl who offers him another life but in the end conforms.

== Cast ==
- Peter Cummins as Gerald Baxter
- Eileen Chapman as Melissa
- Bethany Lee as the girl
- Peter Carmondy as Barry
- Dianne Preston as Christie
- Sarah Chapman as Sally
- Marie Keenan as pub lady
- John Preston as Melissa's lover
- Max Gillies as managing director
- Kris McQuade as Anne Thropomorphic

== Production ==
The film was shot in Victoria partly with funds provided by the Australia Council for the Arts. Filming took four weeks over the summer of 1974 using actors with whom Duigan had worked in the theatre.
