= Bruce Spence =

New Zealand-born Australian actor

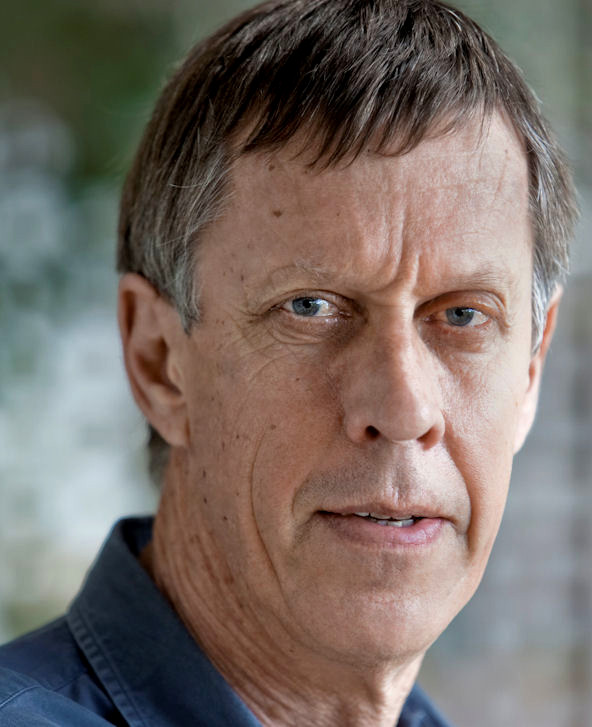
- Spence in 2010
- Born: Bruce Robert Spence; 1945 (age 80–81); Auckland, New Zealand
- Occupations: Actor, voice artist
- Years active: 1970–present
- Height: 2.01 m (6 ft 7 in)

Bruce Robert Spence (born 1945) is a New Zealand-born Australian actor. Spence has over 100 film and television credits and has also acted in theatre.

== Early life and education ==
Bruce Robert Spence was born in 1945.

== Career ==
Spence gained prominence when he played the gyrocopter pilot in Mad Max 2 (1981). He also played the lead role in Werner Herzog's Where the Green Ants Dream (1984) and portrayed Jedediah the pilot in Mad Max Beyond Thunderdome (1985). He has since amassed over 100 film and television credits, and has also acted in theatre.

Spence played the Mouth of Sauron in The Lord of the Rings: The Return of the King (2003), the Trainman in The Matrix Revolutions (2003), and Baxter in Disney's Inspector Gadget 2 (2003). He also voiced the character Chum in Finding Nemo (2003). He portrayed Tion Medon in Star Wars: Episode III – Revenge of the Sith (2005) and played Lord Rhoop in The Chronicles of Narnia: The Voyage of the Dawn Treader (2010).

Spence portrayed the palaeontologist (Huxley) in the Australian performance of BBC's Walking with Dinosaurs: The Live Experience. In his role, Spence narrated the activities of life-sized mechanical dinosaurs operated by teams of puppeteers and drivers.

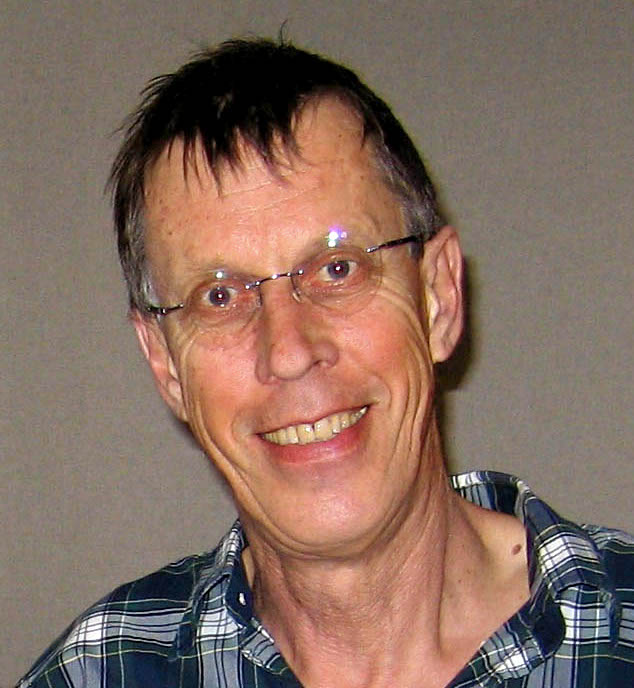
Spence taking a break during an ADR session in November 2008.

In 2008, Spence joined the television series Legend of the Seeker, which was based on the Sword of Truth series by Terry Goodkind. He played the role of Zeddicus Zu'l Zorander, co-starring with Craig Horner and Bridget Regan. The show ran for two seasons.

In 2014, Spence played prison inmate George Corella in episode 3.1 of Rake.

== Recognition and awards ==
Spence won an AFI Award for Best Actor for his role in the 1971 comedy Stork.

In 2024, Spence was named as the recipient of the Equity Lifetime Achievement award.

== Personal life ==
Spence is 2.01 metres tall.

== Filmography ==
=== Film ===
Year	Title	Role	Notes
1971	Stork	Graham 'Stork' Wallace	
1974	Moving On	Road Worker	
1974	The Cars That Ate Paris	Charlie	
1975	The Firm Man	Messenger	
1975	The Great Macarthy	Bill Dean	
1976	Let the Balloon Go	Chief Gifford	
1976	Oz	Bass player/Blondie the Surfie	
1976	Mad Dog Morgan	Heriot	
1976	Eliza Fraser	Bruce McIver	
1978	Newsfront	Redex trial driver	
1979	Dimboola	Morrie McAdam	
1981	Mad Max 2	The Gyro Captain	
1983	Double Deal	Doug Mitchell	
1983	The Return of Captain Invincible	Midnight's Doctor	
1983	Midnite Spares	Wimpy	
1983	Buddies	Ted	
1984	Pallet on the Floor	Basil Beaumont-Foster	
1984	Where the Green Ants Dream (aka Wo die grünen Ameisen träumen)	Lance Hackett	
1985	Mad Max Beyond Thunderdome	Jedediah the Pilot	
1987	Bullseye	Purdy	
1987	The Year My Voice Broke	Jonah	
1988	Bachelor Girl	Alistair Dredge Jr	TV movie
1988	Rikky and Pete	Ben	
1990	Wendy Cracked a Walnut (aka ...Almost)	Ronnie	
1990	The Shrimp on the Barbie	Wayne	
1991	Sweet Talker	Norman Foster	
1993	Hercules Returns	Sprocket	
1995	Ace Ventura: When Nature Calls	Gahjii	
1996	The Munsters' Scary Little Christmas	Mr. Gateman	TV movie
1998	Dark City	Mr. Wall	
2002	Queen of the Damned	Khayman	
2003	Inspector Gadget 2	Professor Baxter	
2003	Finding Nemo	Chum (voice)	
2003	The Matrix Revolutions	Trainman	
2003	The Lord of the Rings: The Return of the King	Mouth of Sauron (Extended edition only)	
2003	Peter Pan	Cookson	
2005	Star Wars: Episode III – Revenge of the Sith	Tion Medon	
2006	Aquamarine	Leonard	
2006	Solo	Kennedy	
2008	Australia	Dr. Barker	
2009	Subdivision	Singlet	
2010	The Chronicles of Narnia: The Voyage of the Dawn Treader	Lord Rhoop	
2013	Mystery Road	Jim the Coroner	
2014	I, Frankenstein	Molokai	
2015	Backtrack	Felix	
2016	Gods of Egypt	Head Judge	
2016	Blue World Order	Whippett	
2017	Pirates of the Caribbean: Dead Men Tell No Tales	Mayor Dix	
2018	Winchester	Augustine	
2018	Occupation	Alien Leader	
2020	Love and Monsters	Old Pete	
2020	Children of the Corn	Pastor Penny	
2020	The Dry	Gerry Hadler	
2021	The Drover's Wife	Father McGuiness	
2023	Cold Water	Murray	Short film
2024	Solid Ground	Captain Jackson Jackman	Short film
2025	Lords of the Soil	John	

=== Television ===
Year	Title	Role	Note	Ref
1972–73	Division 4	Various	2 episodes	
1973	Boney	Sawyer's Ron	1 episode	
1973–75	Certain Women	Julius 'Big Julie'	19 episodes	
1974	Ryan	Wally Scott	1 episode	
1974–75	Matlock Police	Johnny / Maxie	2 episodes	
1978	Case for the Defence	Alfred	2 episodes	
1979	Barnaby and Me	Tall Baddie	TV movie	
1979	Shirl's Neighbourhood	Bruce the gardener		
1979	Skyways	David Howard	1 episode	
1979	Cop Shop	Student Counsellor	1 episode	
1981	And Here Comes Bucknuckle		Series	
1981–82	Kingswood Country	Dentist / Samson	2 episodes	
1982	Deadline	Towie	TV movie	
1984	Special Squad	Professor	1 episode	
1984	Carson's Law	Vernon	2 episodes	
1985	Zoo Family	George	1 episode	
1987	Great Expectations: The Untold Story	Joe Gargery	TV movie	
1987–89	Rafferty's Rules	Triggs	2 episodes	
1988	The Dirtwater Dynasty	Lonely Logan	5 episodes	
1988	Australians	Cecil Cook	1 episode	
1989	Sugar	Robert Flemming	TV movie	
1989	Tanamera – Lion of Singapore	Hammond	7 episodes	
1989–92	Dearest Enemy	Lenny	14 episodes	
1992	Halfway Across the Galaxy and Turn Left	The Chief	18 episodes	
1994–95	Over the Hill	Tall Bob		
1996	After the Beep		7 episodes	
1997	Return to Jupiter	Ed Unit	13 episodes	
1997	Bullpitt!	Darcy Kelso	26 episodes	
1997	Twisted Tales	Colin	1 episode	
1997	Good Guys, Bad Guys	Squirt Man	1 episode	
1998	Moby Dick	Elijah	1 episode	
1998	Halifax f.p.: Isn't It Romantic	Eric Washburn	1 episode	
1999	Chuck Finn	Heinz	1 episode	
2000	Tales of the South Seas	Naari	1 episode	
2001	Beastmaster	Annubis	1 episode	
2001–03	Always Greener	Rev Millburn	3 episodes	
2002	Farscape	Prefect Falaak	1 episode	
2002	Short Cuts	Mr Coxon	5 episodes	
2004	The Brush Off	Philip Veale	TV movie	
2005	Grange		TV movie	
2006	RAN (Remote Area Nurse)	Vince	6 episodes	
2006	Nightmares & Dreamscapes	Hans Morris	1 episode	
2006	Equal Opportunity	Death		
2008	Double the Fist	Mayor McCarthy	1 episode	
2008	City Homicide	Maurice	1 episode	
2008–10	Legend of the Seeker	Zeddicus Zu'l Zorander	44 episodes	
2009	All Saints	Barry Goldsworthy	1 episode	
2011	Cloudstreet	Pig	3 episodes	
2014	Rake	George Corella	1 episode	
2015	Let's Talk About	Man in Toilet	1 episode	
2016	The Wizards of Aus	Regimand	3 episodes	
2016	Black Comedy	Guest Cast	1 episode	
2018	True Story with Hamish & Andy	The Oracle	1 episode	
2021	Back to the Rafters	Charles Whiteman	4 episodes	
2023	Ten Pound Poms	Father	1 episode	
2023	Faraway Downs	Dr Barker	6 episodes	
2024	Nautilus	CBIO President	2 episodes	
2025	The Twelve	Goran Popovich	1 episodes	
2025	He Had It Coming	Professor Walters	1 episodes	

=== Video games ===
Year	Title	Role	Ref.
2003	Enter the Matrix	Trainman	
2014	Borderlands: The Pre-Sequel!	Scav Gyro, Sir Dennis, Toby Van Adobe, Tony Slows, Taunting Scav #2	
202?	Edge of Twilight	Horace	

=== Theme parks ===
Year	Title	Role	Notes
2007	Finding Nemo Submarine Voyage	Chum	

=== Theatre ===
Year	Title	Role	Notes
1969	Dimboola	Morrie McAdam	La Mama Theatre
1970	The Coming of Stork	Graham 'Stork' Wallace	La Mama Theatre
1971	The Removalists	Constable Neville Ross	La Mama Theatre
1985	A Stretch of the Imagination		Nimrod Theatre Company
2005	The Marvellous Boy	Victor/Bain Cipolla	WB Stables by Griffin Theatre Company
2013	The Secret River	Loveday	Sydney Theatre
