= On the Harmful Effects of Tobacco =

Play by Anton Chekhov

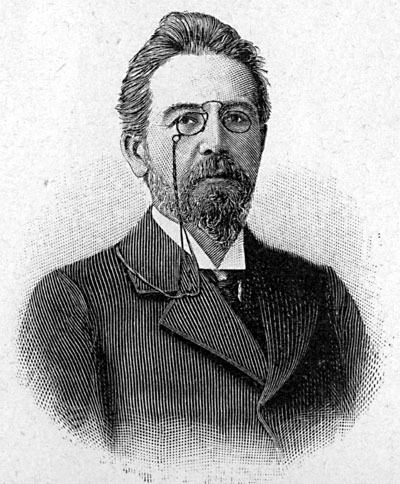
Chekhov in a 1905 illustration.

On the Harmful Effects of Tobacco (Russian: О вреде табака, romanized: O vredye tabaka) is a one-act play by Anton Chekhov. It has one character, Ivan Ivanovich Nyukhin. First published in 1886, the play was revised by Chekhov and is best known from his 1902 version. This was first published in English in The Unknown Chekhov (1954), a collection of writings.

== Plot ==
The action takes place in a town hall. Nyukhin has been told by his wife to give a lecture about "the harmful effects of tobacco", although he is a smoker. He emphasizes that this will be a dry and boring lecture, but always postpones the actual subject by talking about his problems with his domineering wife.

"I must tell you, by the way, that my wife runs a boarding school. Well, not exactly a boarding school, but something in the nature of one. Just between us, my wife likes to complain about hard times, but she has put away a little nest egg... some forty or fifty thousand rubles. As for me, I haven't a kopek to my name, not a penny... "

He wants to stand up against his wife, he wants to run away, to forget and to be alone. He symbolically throws off his old, shabby waistcoat, but suddenly picks it back up, because

"She is here. My wife is there in the wings waiting for me."

By the end of the monologue, Nyukhin has said hardly anything relevant about the harmful effects of tobacco, but asks the audience not to betray him:

"If she asks you, please, I beg you, tell her that her scarecrow husband, I mean, the lecturer, me, behaved with dignity."

== Publication history ==
The play was originally published on 17 February 1886 by Peterburgskaya Gazeta, subtitled "The Monologue scene" (Сцена-монолог) and signed A. Chekhonte (А. Чехонте). Later that year, in a revised version it was included into the Moscow-published Motley Stories (Пестрые рассказы) collection.

Later Chekhov continued to revise it, until the better-known 1902 version was included into the volume 14 of the Complete Works by A.P. Chekhov published by Adolf Marks in 1903. The first English publication was in The Unknown Chekhov (1954), a collection of writings.

== Film adaptation ==
Paul Newman directed a short film adaptation of On The Harmful Effects of Tobacco that received limited screening in New York City in 1962. Nyukhin was played by Michael Strong, who had performed the monologue to high praise in The Actors Studio. Despite a favorable mention in The New York Times, Newman removed his name from the credits for reasons that remain unclear. He gave the sole print to Strong, who kept it until shortly before his death in 1980, when he reportedly asked that a print of his film be sent to the director Jack Garfein. In November 2016, Turner Classic Movies announced plans to air the film in early 2017. TCM originally planned to air On the Harmfulness of Tobacco, Rachel, Rachel and The Effect of Gamma Rays on Man-in-the-Moon Marigolds as part of a "Newman Directs" presentation on Sunday, March 26, 2017. In February 2017, Garfein pulled out of the arrangement with the network, arguing that the airing of the film would impede the success of an independent documentary about the Newman film that Garfein planned to make. As a result, TCM aired only Rachel, Rachel and The Effect of Gamma Rays on Man-in-the-Moon Marigolds that Sunday night at 8 and 10 p.m., but On the Harmfulness of Tobacco was not shown as originally announced.

The play was also adapted and set to music composed by American Dominick Argento, in his A Water Bird Talk (1974–1976); he also used passages (and images in performance) from Audubon's Birds of America.
