= Graeme Blundell =

Australian actor, writer and film critic

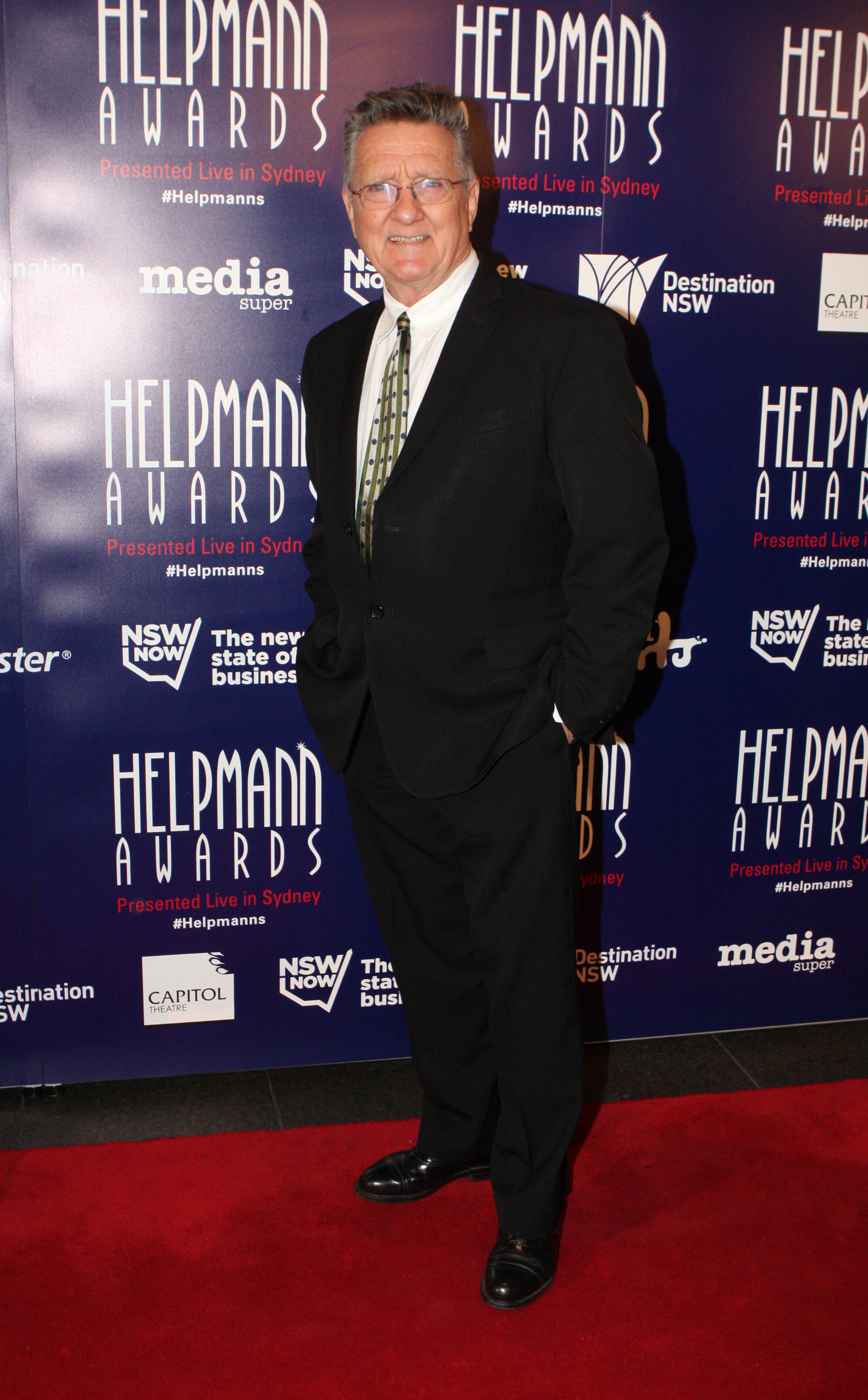
- Blundell at the 2015 Helpmann Awards
- Born: 7 August 1945 (age 81); Melbourne, Victoria, Australia
- Occupations: Actor; director; producer; writer; biographer
- Years active: 1963–present

Graeme Blundell (born 7 August 1945) is an Australian actor, director, producer, writer, playwright, lyricist and biographer.

== Early life ==
Blundell was born on 7 April 1945 in Melbourne; he grew up in the suburb of Clifton Hill. He was educated at Merrilands College and Coburg High School, where he served as a Prefect. He then studied arts at the University of Melbourne, where he resided at Ormond College and became involved in student theatre. He has a younger brother, Dennis, and two younger sisters, Margaret and Kathryn.

== Career ==
In his early years, Blundell worked at La Mama Theatre, the Pram Factory, Hoopla, the Playbox Theatre Company, and the Melbourne Theatre Company. He directed and acted in the premiere performance of Jack Hibberd's play Dimboola at La Mama. His first television appearance was as an uncredited extra in the debut episode of Homicide (1964). He is best known as playing the title character in the 1973 sex-comedy film Alvin Purple and its 1974 sequel, Alvin Rides Again.

He has written extensively in The Australian newspaper as well as writing biographies of Brett Whiteley (Brett Whiteley: An Unauthorised Life, 1996, with his then wife Margot Hilton), and Graham Kennedy.

From March 2011, Blundell hosted Sunday Night at the Movies with Graeme Blundell on Foxtel's Fox Classics channel.

On 29 January 2015, Margaret Pomeranz signed with Foxtel to present a new film and television program on Foxtel Arts, along with Graeme Blundell, a series called Screen. The series was renewed in 2018. As of 2021, Blundell continues to appear in Screen, and past episodes are uploaded to YouTube. He is also TV writer for The Australian newspaper.

== Personal life ==
Blundell has been married to playwright Kerry Dwyer, author Margot Hilton, and journalist Susan Kurosawa.

== Filmography ==
=== Film ===
Year	Title	Role	Type
1965	Watt’s Last Voyage		Short film
1966	The Garden of Eden in Winter		Short film
1968	The Girl-Friends		Short film
1969	Two Thousand Weeks	Journalist (uncredited)	
1970	The Naked Bunyip	Himself	Documentary Film
1970	Brake Fluid		Short film
1971	Carson’s Watermelons		Short film
1971	Stork	Westy	Feature film
1973	Alvin Purple	Alvin Purple	Feature film
1974	Alvin Rides Again	Alvin Purple / Balls McGee	Feature film
1974	Three Old Friends	Ron	Short film
1976	Mad Dog Morgan	Italian Jack	
1976	The Sentimental Bloke	The Bloke	
1976	Don's Party	Simon	
1978	Weekend of Shadows	Bernie	
1979	The Odd Angry Shot	Dawson	
1979	Kostas	John	
1980	Going Home	Jim	TV movie
1981	Pacific Banana	Martin	
1981	Doctors and Nurses	Mr X	
1982	The Best of Friends	Tom	
1983	Midnite Spares	Sidebottom	
1984	Melvin, Son of Alvin	Alvin Purple	
1985	From Opera with Love	Self	TV movie
1986	Australian Dream	Geoffrey Stubbs	
1987	Those Dear Departed	Dr. Howie	Feature film (aka Ghosts Can Do It!)
1987	The Year My Voice Broke	Nils Olson	Feature film
1992	The Distant Home	Dr Chambers	Short film
1993	Joh's Jury	Nicholas Cowdery	TV movie
1994	Gino	Larry Stone	
1996	Idiot Box	Detective Eric	Feature film
1999	Looking for Alibrandi	Ron Bishop	Feature film
2000	The Love of Lionel's Life	Stan	TV movie
2002	Star Wars: Episode II – Attack of the Clones	Ruwee Naberrie	Feature film (scenes deleted)
2005	Star Wars: Episode III – Revenge of the Sith	Ruwee Naberrie	Feature film
2009	In Her Skin	Ivan	

=== Television ===
Year	Title	Role	Type
1964-77	Homicide	John Clark / George Jackson / Duncan / Jason Nash / Tony Guest / Mick Thompson / Freddy Hall / Hazy	TV series, 12 episodes
1969-73	Division 4	Reg White / John Wilson / Alec Mason / Tom Blackett / Jimmy Richard / Ray Cooper / Roy Brown / Jerry Fletcher	TV series, 11 episodes
1972	A Time for Love	Adam	TV series, 1 episode
1973	Ryan	Slade / Flip Mitchell	TV series, 2 episodes
1974	Matlock Police	Jim Andrews	TV series, 1 episode
1974	Marion	Drunk	Miniseries, 1 episode
1974	Behind the Legend	Ray Parer	TV series, 1 episode
1974	The Box	Don Cook	TV series, 162 episodes
1976	Power Without Glory	Snoopy Tanner	Miniseries, 3 episodes
1976	Alvin Purple	Alvin Purple	TV series, 13 episodes
1978-82	Cop Shop	Various characters	TV series, 14 episodes
1980	Young Ramsay	Bob O’Hara	TV series, 1 episode
1980	Lawson's Mates		TV series, 1 episode
1980	Spring & Fall	Garth	TV series, 1 episode
1980	Water Under the Bridge	Ralph	Miniseries, 1 episode
1982-84	Kingswood Country	Warren Florin / Doug C. Horse	TV series, 2 episodes
1983-84	A Country Practice	Antony York / Hilton Mercer	TV series, 4 episodes
1984	Brass Monkeys	Noddy	TV series
1987	Vietnam	Miles	TV series, 2 episodes
1988	Richmond Hill	Mick Fryer	TV series
1989	Rafferty's Rules	Bill Wiley	TV series, 1 episode
1992	G.P.	Dr Peter Swift	TV series, 1 episode
1996	Naked: Stories of Men	Hughie	TV series, 1 episode
1996-97	Fire	Snr. Station Officer Druce	TV series, 35 episodes
1996-97	Medivac	Harry Edwards	TV series, 35 episodes
1998	Murder Call	Morgan Mason	TV series, season 2, episode 9: Deadfall
2001	All Saints	Peter Hurst	TV series, 1 episode
2001	Pizza	Judge	TV series, 1 episode
2002	The Secret Life of Us	Alex’s Dad	TV series, 1 episode
2003	Ocean Star	Clive ‘Swampy’ Marsh	TV series, 10 episodes
2003	Marking Time	Ralph Dave	Miniseries
2004	Through My Eyes	Rex Kuchel	Miniseries, 2 episodes
2007	Chandon Pictures	John	TV series, 1 episode
2008	The Hollowmen	Geoff	TV series, 3 episodes
2009	East West 101	Shock Jock	TV series, 2 episodes
2011	Underbelly	Jack Long	TV series, 2 episodes
2011	Sunday Night at the Movies	Host	TV series
2011-12	Laid	Graham McVie	TV series, 12 episodes
2015-2021	Screen	Co-presenter (alongside Margaret Pomeranz)	TV series
2018	Saturday Night at the Movies	Host	TV series

== Theatre ==
Year	Title	Role	Type
1969	Dimboola	Mutton	La Mama Theatre (premiere performance); Also director

== Writing ==
- Brett Whiteley: An Unauthorised Life, with Margot Hilton (Macmillan, 1996)
- King: The Life and Comedy of Graham Kennedy (Pan Macmillan, 2003)
- Australian Theatre: Backstage with Graeme Blundell (edited) (Oxford University Press, 1997)
- The Naked Truth: A Life in Parts (Hachette Australia, 2008)
- The Australian newspaper - TV writer
