= Jack Hibberd =

Australian playwright (1940–2024)

- Born: John Charles Hibberd; 12 April 1940; Warracknabeal, Victoria, Australia
- Died: 30 August 2024 (aged 84)
- Education: University of Melbourne
- Occupations: Playwright, physician
- Website: Official website

John Charles Hibberd (12 April 1940 – 30 August 2024) was an Australian playwright best known for his plays Dimboola (1969) and A Stretch of the Imagination (1972). He was also a physician.

== Biography ==
Hibberd studied medicine at the University of Melbourne and resided in Newman College. He worked as a registrar in the Department of Social Medicine at St Vincent's Hospital, Melbourne, from 1966 to 1967. He worked as a general practitioner until 1984, after which he practiced as a clinical immunologist.

He was married to actress Evelyn Krape, with whom he had two children, as well as having two children from a previous marriage.

Hibberd co-founded the Australian Performing Group (APG) in 1970. He was a member for ten years, and chairman for two. In 1983 he founded the Melbourne Writers Theatre, which is still active today. He served on the Theatre Board of The Australia Council twice, and recently on its Literature Board.

Hibberd died on 30 August 2024, at the age of 84.

== Literary career ==
Hibberd wrote close to 40 plays, some of them not full length. His first play, White With Wire Wheels, was staged in 1967 at the University of Melbourne, and is a proto-feminist revenge play, which satirizes male herd behaviour and the men's obsession with cars and alcohol-virility over women.

Hibberd's micro-play, Three Old Friends, opened the La Mama Theatre in Melbourne (29 July 1967). This work was one of a number of very short works in which Hibberd reconnoitred the styles of Beckett, Pinter and Brecht. These, plus a couple of longer plays (Who and One of Nature's Gentlemen) made up a season called Brain-Rot (1968).

There followed Hibberd's most popular play: Dimboola, a wedding breakfast farce with audience participation. It premiered in 1969 at La Mama Theatre under the direction of Graeme Blundell. The play grew out of a reading in London of Anton Chekhov's 1889 play The Wedding and Bertolt Brecht's farce A Respectable Wedding. A 1979 Australian independent film based on the play was directed by John Duigan.

His next play, a long monodrama, A Stretch of the Imagination, is regarded by most connoisseurs as his finest work, embodying a radical advance in the character of Australian theatre, embracing and remoulding as it does many of the strong strands in theatrical modernism. In 1976 it was performed by Max Gillies of the APG; he reprised his role in the 1990 TV movie version. It was the first Australian play to be staged in China (in Mandarin) with a famous Chinese actor, Wei Zongwan, as Monk. This play has enjoyed productions in the United States, Germany and New Zealand. In 2010 it was performed in London by Mark Little, a winner of the prestigious Laurence Olivier Award.

Hibberd completed some stage adaptations of short stories: Nikolai Gogol's "The Overcoat" (with music), Guy de Maupassant's "Odyssey of a Girl", and Leo Tolstoy's The Death of Ivan Ilyich. Hibberd's most challenging plays were his monodramas, in which he specialized. Those for women included Female Rhapsodies (sub-titled 'curtain-raisers'), Lavender Bags and Mothballs. The first entails a preparation for a wedding (a fantasy performance), the second explores the fine public face of grief and its ugly private underbelly. Apart from Stretch, there is a gargantuan male on monodrama, From Apes to Apps, subtitled A History of the Western World in Ninety Minutes.

Peggy Sue, a companion to White with Wire Wheels, dramatises the mistreatment and exploitation of three romantic young women during a severe economic depression when they are compelled to work as prostitutes. Liquid Amber is a companion to Dimboola, and has audience participation at a golden wedding celebration. A Toast to Melba and The Les Darcy Show embraces the lives of the famous diva Dame Nellie Melba and the champion boxer Les Darcy. Repossession concentrates on the conflicts between two poor young women who live in a shack out in the bush and two domineering corporate captains who, stranded, turn up for the night.

Hibberd's later plays were Commandments, in which five of the Ten Commandments are inverted, or perverted, so that the breaking of a commandment becomes ethically justified. And Guantanamo Bay, which is set in that institution and is visited by President George W. Bush, Dick Cheney, Donald Rumsfeld, Douglas Feith and Paul Wolfowitz because it is "Open Day at Guantanamo Bay", and, to begin the celebrations, there is a performance of The History of American Violence... a play within a play. The guests watch some examples of the artistry of contemporary torture. Later they are joined by Tony Blair and John Howard, Australia's "Man of Steel." Fidel Castro appears as an interlude. A waiter called Malcolm X causes great distress among the American dignitaries.

== Selected works ==
=== Plays ===
- White with Wire Wheels (1967)
- Memoirs of a Carlton Bohemian (1967)
- Brainrot (1968) – "The Great Gap of Time", "No Time Like the Present", "One of Nature's Gentlemen"
- The Last Days of Epic J. Remorse (aka Death Rattle) (1968, revised 1994)
- Dimboola (1968)
- Customs and Excise aks Proud Flesh
- Klag (1970)
- Aorta (1971)
- Marvellous Melbourne (1970)
- A Stretch of the Imagination (1972)
- Women
- Captain Midnight, VC (1972, revised 1984)
- The Les Darcy Show (1974)
- Peggy Sue (1975)
- A Toast to Melba (1975)
- The Overcoat Sin (1977)
- Sin (1978)
- A Man of Many Parts (1979)
- Mothballs (1980)
- Liquid Amber (1982)
- Glycerine Tears (1982)
- Malarky Barks (1983)
- The Old School Tie (1983)
- Odyssey of a Girl (1984)
- Slam Dunk (1984)
- Lavender Bags (1985)
- Female Rhapsodies (1986)
- The Prodigal Son (1990)
- The Dutiful Daughter (1993)
- Legacy (1997)
- Repossession (1998)
- A History of the Western World in Ninety Minutes (1998)
- The Death of Ivan Ilyich (1999)
- The Crown vs Alice Springs (2001)
- An Evening with Elizabeth Bowen and Sean O'Faolin (2002)
- The Spanish Dancer (2004)
- The Second Coming (2007)
- Commandments (2009)
- Guantanamo Bay (2009)

=== Published plays and editions ===
- Four Popular Plays (1970) White With Wire Wheels and Who? ISBN 0 14 048106 0
- Three Popular Plays: A Toast to Melba, The Les Darcy Show and One of Nature's Gentlemen ISBN 0 908011 03 2
- A Stretch of the Imagination (1973) ISBN 0 85893 026 9
- The Overcoat and Sin (1981) ISBN 0 86819 055 1
- Captain Midnight VC (1972, 1984) ISBN 0 86805 020 2
- Dimboola (1974)Penguin Books No ISBN
- Dimboola and Liquid Amber ISBN 0 14 048197 4
- Squibs (a collection of short plays, 1984) ISBN 0 949780 05 7
- Slam Dunk (1985) ISBN 0 86819 483 2
- Plays of the 70s (1998) ISBN 0 86819 548 0
- Selected Plays (2000) ISBN 0 86819 632 0
- Duets (The Old School Tie and Glycerine Tears) ISBN 0 86805 069 5
- The Prodigal Son (2001) ISBN 0 86819 644 4

=== Novels ===
- Memoirs of an Old Bastard (1989) ISBN 0-86914-231-3
- The Life of Riley (1990) ISBN 1-86330-087-2
- Perdita (1992) ISBN 0-86914-239-9

=== Poetry ===
- Le vin des amants (1977) – after Charles Baudelaire ISBN 0-908131-02-X
- The Genius of Human Imperfection (1988) ISBN 1-876044-26-8
- Madrigals for a Misanthrope (2005) ISBN 1-876044-46-2

=== Musical theatre ===
- The Overcoat (1976) – adaptation of Nikolai Gogol's novel of that name, music by Martin Friedel
- Sin, opera in 7 deadly acts & entracts (1978) – commissioned by the Victoria State Opera, music by Martin Friedel
- Smash hit! or a goggle-moggle for Kugel (1980) – a play with music by George Dreyfus
- Odyssey of a Prostitute (1984) – a singspiel adaptation of a Maupassant story, music by Martin Friedel

=== Other ===
- The Barracker's Bible (1983, with Garrie Hutchinson) – a dictionary of Australian sporting slang ISBN 0-86914-028-0
- The Great Allergy Detective Book (1995) ISBN 1-86395-103-2

Over the years Hibberd has also published short stories and essays on theatre.

=== Screenplays ===
Miss Finger

A nocturnal thriller set in Melbourne. Miss Finger, a forensic scientist turns detective after her two children die of overdoses. With the help of a suave Sydney detective, she weaves her way through Melbourne's unsavoury and ethnically diverse underground, finally finding and nailing the Big Drug Baron, a toad-featured Australian Vietnam Vet, who originally went AWOL into the Golden Triangle.

Captain Midnight VC

Midnight is a VC winner from World War Two, but is denied a soldier settlement post-war because of his sooty complexion. He becomes an Aboriginal radical and an agitator for Black Power. He enlists the aid of black Americans and Africans, who infiltrate Australia, bomb Parliament House killing all its members, and seducing paddocks of white women. A deal is finally attained: all white Tasmanians are exiled to the mainland, and those urban and landless indigenes take over Tasmania, which they name Trugininiland.

Uncle Sam

Uncle Sam, who has been incarcerated in the Hollywood Hospital for the Psychiatrically Challenged, escapes with the help of Charlie Chan, and begins a presidential campaign, assisted by an unexpected electoral team, including, among others, Black Hawk, Davy Crockett, Paul Bunyan, Mark Twain, Superman, Eleanor Roosevelt, Zapata, George Washington, Janis Joplin, Curt Cobain, Rabbi Harpo Marx, and Mr Ed. Over the course of his campaign, Uncle Sam's liberal and leftish platform, along with his outmaneuvering of his two opponents and corporations in a television debate, leads to a victory in the election.

=== Television ===
Singing the Seventies A six-part series embracing the culture of the Seventies. Each episode is situated in a different Melbourne suburb. Each episode devotes itself to a particular profession of occupation. For example, Carlton is theatre; the CBD, finance; South Melbourne, the media, etc. There are number of through-characters who bind the free-standing episodes together.

== Awards ==
- State Library of Victoria Creative Fellowships 2005

== Bibliography ==
- McGillick, Paul (1988). Ortrun Zuber-Skerritt (ed.). Jack Hibberd. Australian Playwrights. Rodopi. ISBN 90-5183-003-3.
