= John Duigan =

Australian film director

- Born: 19 June 1949 (age 77); Hartley Wintney, Hampshire, England
- Education: University of Melbourne (1973)
- Occupations: Film director, screenwriter
- Years active: 1975–present
- Spouse: Nammi Le

John Duigan (born 19 June 1949) is an Australian film director and screenwriter. He is mostly known for his two autobiographical films The Year My Voice Broke and Flirting, as well as the 1994 film Sirens, which starred Hugh Grant.

== Biography ==
Duigan was born in Hartley Wintney, Hampshire, England to an Australian father, and emigrated to Australia in 1961. He is related to many Australian performers, being the brother of novelist Virginia Duigan (wife of director Bruce Beresford) and uncle of Trilby Beresford.

Duigan studied at the University of Melbourne, where he resided at Ormond College and graduated in 1973 with a master's degree in Philosophy. While at university, he worked extensively as an actor and director in theatre, and acted in a number of films (including Brake Fluid, Bonjour Balwyn and Dalmas).

He began directing films in 1974, with early successes including Mouth to Mouth, winner of the Jury Prize at the Australian Film Institute (AFI) Awards and Winter of our Dreams, for which he won an Australian Writers' Guild award for Best Screenplay. His 1981 film Winter of Our Dreams was entered into the 13th Moscow International Film Festival.

The mini-series Vietnam followed in 1987; it was one of Nicole Kidman's first major roles. Subsequently, Duigan worked in the United States and Europe, returning to Australia to make Sirens, winner of Best Film at the St. Petersburg Film Festival.

In the United States, he directed Romero, starring Raul Julia, which won the Humanitas Award, and Lawn Dogs, winner of numerous prizes in European festivals.

In England, he directed The Leading Man, from a screenplay by his sister Virginia, The Parole Officer with Steve Coogan, and in Canada/France/UK Head in the Clouds with Charlize Theron and Penélope Cruz, winner in Canada of four Genie Awards and Best Film at the Milan Film Festival.

Between 2005 and 2010, he took time off from the film industry to work on a book on secular ethics, returning to Australia to direct Careless Love in 2011/12.

== Personal Life ==
In 2013, Duigan, 64, married actress and artist Nammi Le, 33, after working together on the film Careless Love in which Le starred as a student moonlighting as an escort.

==== Allegations of Abuse ====
In 2011, actress Thandiwe Newton first alleged that Duigan pursued a coercive sexual dynamic with her that started right before they began working together on her first film, Flirting. She was 16 years old and it allegedly continued for four years.

== Filmography ==
Actor

- Bonjour Balwyn (1971)

Director

- The Firm Man (1975)
- The Trespassers (1976)
- Mouth to Mouth (1978)
- Dimboola (1979)
- Winter of Our Dreams (1981)
- Far East (1982)
- One Night Stand (1984)
- Winners (1985 TV series) - episode "Room to Move"
- Room to Move (1987 TV movie)
- The Year My Voice Broke (1987)
- Vietnam (1987)
- Fragments of War: The Story of Damien Parer (1988, TV)
- Romero (1989)
- Flirting (1991)
- Wide Sargasso Sea (1993)
- Sirens (1994)
- The Journey of August King (1995)
- The Leading Man (1996)
- Lawn Dogs (1997)
- Molly (1999)
- Paranoid (2000)
- The Parole Officer (2001)
- Head in the Clouds (2004)
- Careless Love (2012)
