= Universal Theatre =

Australian theatre

The Universal Theatre was a theatre at 13 Victoria Street, Fitzroy in Melbourne, Australia which operated from the late 1970s to the late 1990s.

It was established as part of the Universal Workshop in the mid-1970s by colourful barrister John Weller. The Universal Workshop was a former factory containing the theatre, a cinema and studios.

The Universal Theatre opened as a professional venue in May 1979 with Robyn Archer's cabaret A Star is Torn, which played for five weeks. The theatre gained an early reputation for lively alternative performance including theatre, visual theatre, music and comedy.

During the 1980s, the 320-seat theatre and small cinema were converted into a 450-seat main theatre and the 150-seat Universal 2. Long-running productions included Wogs Out of Work and Torch Song Trilogy.

The building was redeveloped into apartments in the mid-2000s.
