= La Mama Theatre (Melbourne) =

Theatre in Carlton, Victoria, Australia

Coordinates: 37.7991221°S 144.9676587°E

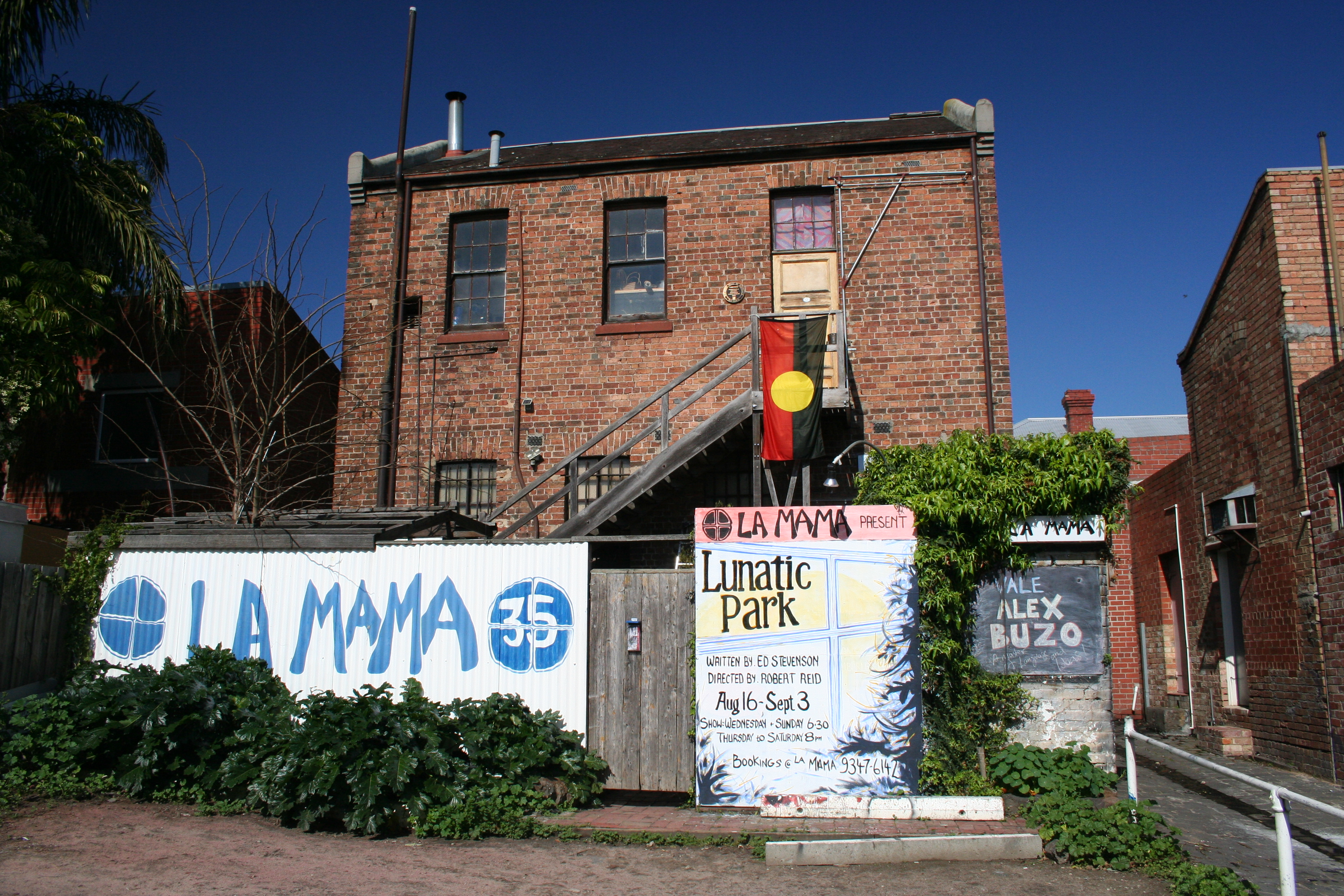
- Interactive map of La Mama Theatre
- Address: 205 Faraday St, Carlton, Victoria; Australia

Construction
- Opened: 1967; 59 years ago

Website
- lamama.com.au

La Mama Theatre is a not-for-profit theatre in Carlton, Victoria, Australia, first established in 1967. La Mama produces work by theatre makers of all backgrounds.

== History ==
The theatre, an initiative of founder Betty Burstall, was inspired by the "off-off-Broadway" theatre scene in New York City. Betty and her husband, film maker Tim Burstall, had just returned from a trip to New York and wanted to re-create the vibrancy and immediacy of the small theatres there. La Mama was modelled after the similarly named New York venue La MaMa Experimental Theatre Club.

I got the idea for La Mama when we went to New York in the sixties. We were poor. It was impossible to go to the theatre – even to see a film was expensive – but there were these places where you paid fifty cents for a cup of coffee and you saw a performance, and if you felt like it you put some money in a hat for the actors. I saw some awful stuff and some good stuff. It was very immediate and exciting and when I came back to Melbourne I wanted to keep going, but there didn't exist such a place. So I talked around a bit, to a few actors and writers and directors, sounding them out about doing their own stuff, Australian stuff, but for nothing ... I decided on Carlton because in 1967 it was a lively, tatty area with an Italian atmosphere and plenty of students.

— Betty Burstall

At a time when the production of Australian plays was almost non-existent (and financially risky), La Mama's non-for-profit organisation provided the venue for the performance of new experimental Australian theatre works. The first play performed at La Mama was a work by a new Australian writer Jack Hibberd, entitled Three Old Friends (1967), whose most successful play Dimboola opened there in 1969. The production of Australian works at La Mama soon became a staple, and within the first two years of its life twenty-five new Australian plays had premiered there.

La Mama also nurtured new works by composers, poets, and filmmakers. The opening of the alternative theatre provided a home base for many important figures in theatre and film including Hibberd and Alex Buzo. It was also regularly used by the underground performance troupe Tribe (who later collaborated with Spectrum). The theatre's house troupe, the La Mama Group, established by actor-director Graeme Blundell, evolved into the Australian Performing Group. La Mama's list of alumni includes notable Australian theatre artists such as David Williamson, Cate Blanchett, Jack Hibberd, Graeme Blundell, Judith Lucy and Julia Zemiro.

In recent years, La Mama artists such as The Rabble, Daniel Schlusser, Nicola Gunn and many others have gone on to make theatre and film internationally.

== Current ==
La Mama's model of giving artists upfront funding to present work in a rent-free venue, with 80% box-office return, supports a high artistic risk/low financial risk proposition for artists and encourages a high volume of activity. In addition, access to rehearsal and meeting space, administrative, marketing and technical support, and ticketing reduces the barriers posed by a lack of money or infrastructure for artists.

== Venues ==
La Mama operates out of two buildings: the original La Mama Theatre on Faraday Street, and the La Mama Courthouse a block away on Drummond Street.

The simple two-storey brick building housing the La Mama Theatre was originally built as a printing works for AR Ford in 1883. After serving various industrial purposes, it was leased in 1967 for use as a small theatre to nurture new Australian drama. Designed by Carlton architect George S Clarke, it faced a right-of-way off University Street, which is south of and parallel to Faraday Street. On 19 May 2018, La Mama was largely destroyed by fire. It reopened on 9 December 2021, with the existing theatre building restored and a new structure to the front. The size of the performance space is the same, along with its original features (the internal staircase, the trapdoor and the fireplace).

La Mama Courthouse, the former Carlton Courthouse built in 1887, has been managed by La Mama since the mid-1990s. It has a standard capacity of around 75.
