= Australian Performing Group =

Experimental theatre company in Melbourne

The Australian Performing Group (APG) was a Melbourne-based experimental theatre repertory ensemble formed in an official capacity in 1970 from the La Mama theatre group. Created to address a dissatisfaction with Australia's theatrical climate, the APG focused primarily on producing new works by then-emerging Australian writers such as Barry Oakley, Jack Hibberd, Kris Hemensley, Bill Garner, John Romeril, Steve J. Spears and David Williamson.

The then unnamed Australian Performing Group from Melbourne started out in 1967 as a group of writers and actors working together at La Mama theatre in Carlton. In 1970 the APG was officially formed and then set up a theatre in a former pram factory in Drummond Street, Carlton. Here, and in other venues throughout Melbourne and other parts of Australia, the ensemble presented alternative, experimental, avant-garde and radical plays, musical comedies, vaudeville, stage shows, street theatre and circus acts, using comedy, drama, music and dance to entertain and, in some cases, to turn the spotlight on its concerns about social, political and feminist issues. The ensemble also produced a record album (The Great Stumble Forward: Matchbox and the APG at the Pram) and a feature length film (Dimboola). Quite a few of the hundred-plus works performed by the APG between 1970 and 1979 received critical and popular acclaim. APG actors, writers and performers had a major impact on the nature and content of live theatre in Australia. Their government-subsidized organisation provided acting, designing, and play-writing opportunities to many people who might not otherwise have had the chance to create. Like most of its productions, management at the APG was also radically different. Instead of a conventional, hierarchical structure, the APG was run as a self-managed collective. (Officially it was a cooperative society.) But by 1981 the group had disintegrated. The only surviving part is/was Circus Oz, an APG off-shoot formed in 1978 when the APG’s Soapbox Circus and The Captain Matchbox Whoopee Band joined with the New Ensemble Circus of Adelaide.

== See also ==
- John Timlin, a financier of the Australian Performing Group
