= Pram Factory =

Former theatre in Melbourne, Australia

Coordinates: 37.797978°S 144.968424°E

The Pram Factory was an Australian alternative theatre venue in the Melbourne suburb of Carlton from around 1970 until 1981. It was home to the Australian Performing Group; Nindethana, Australia's first Aboriginal theatre group; Circus Oz; and Wimmins Circus.

== Building ==
The buildings in Drummond Street, Carlton, that housed the Pram Factory consisted of a former factory that made baby carriages (known as "prams", an abbreviation of "perambulator"), called Paramaount, and stables. A 150-seat theatre was constructed in 1970, as a new home for the Australian Performing Group, which moved from La Mama Theatre. It expanded to a second theatre, with 75 seats, in 1973.

== Performances and activities ==
The Pram Factory is best known as the home for the Australian Performing Group.

The Pram Factory became the site of a number activities besides stage productions, including protest meetings, and was known for its unconventional performances that were part of the "New Wave" of Australian drama. It nurtured New Left politics, comedy, popular theatre, new Australian writing, puppetry, and circus. Writer Helen Garner was a frequent patron at the Pram Factory before and during the writing of her seminal 1977 novel Monkey Grip, which showcased much of what was then a considerably counter-cultural, bohemian Carlton and inner-city Melbourne. Garner's former husband, Bill Garner, had been a member of the Pram Factory performance group throughout its heyday.

Nindethana Theatre, Australia's first Aboriginal theatre company, founded by Jack Charles and Bob Maza, was founded at the Pram Factory in 1971.

Circus Oz, and later feminist circus troupe Wimmins Circus were based at the venue in the late 1970s.

Plays premiered at the Pram Factory include Don's Party (1971), the satirical The Hills Family Show (1977), and Pecking Orders by Phillip Motherwell (1976).

== Demolition ==
The building was demolished in 1981 despite protest from the theatre community and Carlton residents. The Lygon Court shopping centre was built in its place to the designs of architect Ermin Smrekar.

== Legacy ==
The theatre had a unique and lasting influence on the cultural life of Australia, as a place where Australian talent of many kinds was nurtured, including writers, actors, film directors, theatre directors, artists, musicians, circus performers and arts administrators. Circus Oz grew out of the Pram Factory.

== See also ==
- La Mama Theatre (Melbourne)
- Wimmins Circus
