= Valhalla Cinema, Melbourne =

Cinema in Richmond, Melbourne, Victoria

Valhalla Cinema
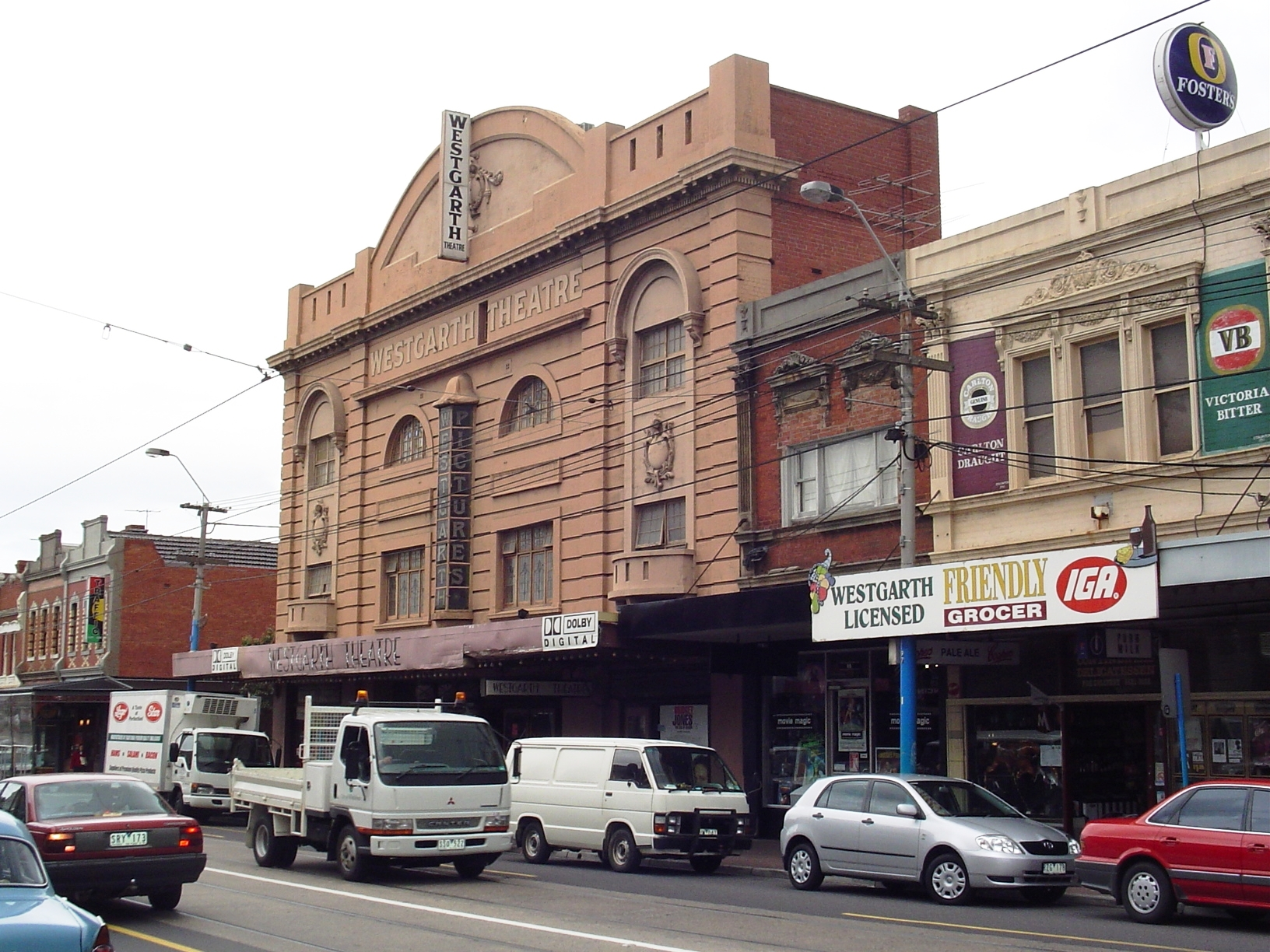
- The Westgarth Cinema, former home of the Valhalla, as it was in 2004

General information
- Location: 216 Victoria Street, Richmond, Melbourne, Victoria (1976–1987); High Street, Westgarth, Victoria (1987–1996), Australia
- Coordinates: 37.810457°S 144.998418°E

The Valhalla Cinema was a repertory and arthouse cinema in Melbourne, Australia. Noted for audience participation films, it was named for Valhalla, the "Hall of the slain" in Norse mythology. It ran as the Valhalla at Victoria Street, Richmond from 1976 until 1987, when it moved to the present location of the Westgarth Theatre in Northcote. In 1996 the Valhalla closed its doors and became Westgarth Cinema, now the Palace Westgarth.

== History ==
The cinema opened its doors on 10 June 1976 at 216 Victoria Street, Richmond. The first film to be screened there was Michael Ritchie's "Smile". The cinema was started by two friends from Sydney University: Barry Peak and Christopher Kiely. They had been running short seasons of films by the likes of the Marx Brothers, W.C. Fields & Mae West and Humphrey Bogart in Melbourne for some time. Realising that they needed a permanent home in Melbourne, rather than keep renting venues such as the Palais and The National in St Kilda and the Horticultural Hall in Victoria Street, Melbourne, they leased the cinema at 216 Victoria Street, Richmond.

Although it initially had no seats, and patrons had to bring their own, it soon found a following. Among its more distinctive traits were its calendars, which contained up to six months' worth of upcoming attractions, and its request board, where anyone could add a request for any film with a reasonable expectation of its being screened.

Later, it became the home of two long-running audience participation films, The Rocky Horror Picture Show (from 1978) and The Blues Brothers (from 1980), as well as regular 24-hour film marathons. The marathons were often science-fiction-themed, showing anything from Hollywood blockbusters like "Terminator 2: Judgment Day", B-grade films such as "Them!", or the complete series of Star Trek motion pictures. Animation celebrations were popular with audiences. The cinema also ran regular weekend, or week-long, festivals on a theme: Jacques Tati, New Russian Cinema, Rainer Fassbinder, Werner Herzog, Pink Panther, Bond films, Astaire/Rogers, Woody Allen, Mel Brooks, and Akira Kurosawa.

Shows like these – and the general selections played there – quickly led to the Valhalla becoming firmly associated in the public mind with cult films. At its peak, audiences included 400 patrons and 30 dedicated performers. From the late 1970s, Valhalla expanded both within Melbourne and around Australia. It opened the Academy Valhalla Twin Cinema in the heritage-listed Manchester Unity building on the corner of Swanston and Collins Streets, Melbourne; Valhalla at the Agora at La Trobe University, and late shows at The Astor in St Kilda; the Academy Twin, Paddington, Sydney; and then cinemas in Adelaide, Perth and Brisbane.

In 1987, the Valhalla relocated from Richmond to the Westgarth Theatre in High Street, Westgarth, after the sale of their original venue (it was later demolished). With the characteristic offbeat nature of the cinema, the last film screened at the old premises was the first half of "The Blues Brothers", with the second half being screened at the new venue after intermission. This caused a traffic jam in Richmond at 1 am. The Valhalla closed its doors in 1996 and became the Westgarth Cinema, after the rental costs of their Northcote site became too high to meet.

The owners of the Westgarth cinema building continued to run it, as "The Westgarth", until early 2006. At that point, the cinema business was sold to the Palace Films and Cinemas chain, whilst they retain the ownership of the building. The building reopened after extensive renovations and the addition of two more screens. It now screens more traditionally arthouse fare.

== People ==
The original team of people who ran the Val went on to help run a number of the other independent cinemas in Melbourne. The Nova Cinema in Carlton is partly owned by Barry Peak. In the 1980s Barry Peak and Chris Kiely wrote, produced and directed four feature films: Future Schlock, Channel Chaos, The Big Hurt and As Time Goes By. Some of the managers of various Valhalla Cinemas include Ray Pond, Sue Thompson, Jane Kendrik, Andrew W Morse and Peter Castaldi.

== Other Valhallas ==
Glebe in Sydney was also home to a cinema called the Valhalla Cinema, which was very similar to the Melbourne version – they produced a calendar of screenings, for example. The Valhalla in Sydney opened in 1979 when Chris Kiely (one of the original Melbourne Valhalla partners) leased the 1937 Art Deco Astor Cinema. It closed in August 2005.

In March 2013, the "Valhalla Social Cinema" began operating in Melbourne. Celebrating the memory of Valhalla's 24-hour marathons, it is operated by Jose Maturana. The portable community cinema did not reside in a permanent location, instead appearing in spaces that are not traditionally associated with movie halls. It specialised in 12- and 24-hour marathons.
