= Peter Hosking (actor) =

Australian actor

- Born: 19 December 1947 (age 78)
- Education: Royal Melbourne Institute of Technology
- Occupations: Actor, audiobook narrator
- Years active: 1978–current

Peter Hosking (born 19 December 1947) is an Australian actor and audiobook narrator.

== Education ==
Hosking graduated from Royal Melbourne Institute of Technology (RMIT) with a Diploma of Civil Engineering.

At the age of 30, after realising an office job wasn't his calling, Hosking began pursuing a career in acting.

== Career ==
Hosking began acting professionally in 1978, with Melbourne-based experimental theatre repertory ensemble, the Australian Performing Group at the The Pram Factory, followed by La Mama.

In the early 1980s, Hosking made several guest appearances in the television series Cop Shop and Prisoner. He featured in an episode of 1981 miniseries I Can Jump Puddles and played the recurring guest role of Sergeant Basher Beasley in The Sullivans, before undertaking another recurring role the following year, in Come Midnight Monday. He also appeared in several films, including 1982 crime drama Squizzy Taylor, 1985's Channel Chaos and 1985 comedy Malcolm, the latter starring Colin Friels.

Hosking landed the ongoing role of Detective Sergeant Blair in The Fast Lane from 1985. He then acted alongside Meryl Streep and Sam Neill in 1987 Fred Schepisi film Evil Angels, the true story of the disappearance of Azaria Chamberlain and the subsequent trial of Lindy Chamberlain. He also made several guest appearances in medical drama series The Flying Doctors.

Hosking secured the recurring role of Gavin Heywood in long-running soap opera Neighbours from 1992. The following year, he appeared in the first of two The Feds TV movies, playing Roland Cloke. In 1996, Hosking received a TDK Australian Audio Book Award for his narration on Home Before Dark. That same year, he starred in an episode of drama series Halifax f.p., alongside Rebecca Gibney, before beginning a recurring role as Assistant Commissioner Phil Daly in the series State Coroner with Wendy Hughes.

Hosking appeared – together with his dog Scarlett – in the film Siam Sunset, which premiered at the 1999 Melbourne International Film Festival. The following year, he performed opposite Nick Giannopoulos and Vince Colosimo in 2000 comedy film The Wog Boy, playing the role of Bazza.

After having presented for radio station, Nu Country 94.9FM, Hosking created Nu Country TV, a country music show on community television station C31 Melbourne. He produced, filmed and edited the show for four years, from 2002. He also recorded the radio comedy series Bob and Bill.

Hosking performed in several stage productions in 2007, including portraying Abner Dillon in a production of musical 42nd Street. He also performed the one-man play A Stretch of the Imagination and took on the title role in Topo, for Sydney's Seymour Centre.

After 30 years in Australian theatre, film, tv and voice work, Hosking relocated to Prague in Czech Republic in 2008, initially only intending on staying for a year. He began working in English language film, television and theatre, including the Cimrman English Theatre, performing English language translations of the works of Jára Cimrman, a man voted the greatest Czech of all time.

In 2009, Hosking took on the voice role of the main character Dennis, for the video game Icycle, reprising the role again in the 2013 sequel Icycle: On Thin Ice. He has voiced numerous advertisements (including Bunnings), redubbed Chinese action movies, and has narrated audiobooks in the hundreds. Much of his narrating work has been reviewed by Audiofile Magazine in the USA.

From 2011 to 2014, Hosking played the role of Cardinal Giovanni Battista Savelli in several episodes of historical drama series Borgia. During this time, he also had a role in 2012 TV movie Dangerous Remedy. Hosking then appeared opposite Morgan Freeman and Clive Owen in 2015 action drama film Last Knights. Roles followed in 2017 American feature films The Ottoman Lieutenant and The Catcher Was a Spy, as well as sport biopic Borg vs McEnroe. He also appeared in the television series Britannia. before voicing the character Hanush of Leipa in 2018 video game Kingdom Come: Deliverance.

More recently, Hosking appeared in zombie film Army of Thieves and family film A Boy Called Christmas, both in 2021. He had a role in 2023 film Extraction 2, alongside Chris Hemsworth, and appeared opposite Orlando Bloom in the TV series Carnival Row the same year.

== Selected credits ==
=== Television ===
Year	Title	Role	Notes	Ref
1979	Skyways	Grigori Xanthos	1 episode	
1980–1984	Cop Shop	Campbell / Alfred Virgona / George Wood	7 episodes	
1981	I Can Jump Puddles	Blue	Miniseries, 1 episode	
1981	The Sullivans	Sergeant Basher Beasley	6 episodes	
1981; 1982; 1986	Prisoner	Keith Moore / Dan Proctor / Gary Grey	3 episodes	
1982	Come Midnight Monday	Frank Harrison	6 episodes	
1983	Home		3 episodes	
1983	A Descant for Gossips	Barman	TV movie	
1983	Too Many People are Disappearing		TV movie	
1983	All the Rivers Run		Miniseries	
1983; 1984	Carson's Law	Detective Lane / Boyd / Porter	4 episodes	
1984	The Keepers	McGuiness	1 episode	
1984	Special Squad	Neighbour	1 episode	
1985	The Henderson Kids	Policeman	2 episodes	
1985	Anzacs	Major Driscoll	Miniseries, 1 episode	
1985–1986	The Fast Lane	Detective Sergeant Blair	13 episodes	
1986	The Local Rag		TV movie	
1986	Fame and Misfortune	Bernie	6 episodes	
1986	Just Us	Sub-Editor	TV movie	
1986	The Great Bookie Robbery		Miniseries	
1987	In Between	Teacher	Miniseries, 1 episode	
1988	A Matter of Convenience (aka Sentiments)	Registrar 2	1 episode	
1988	Rafferty’s Rules	Gavin Courtney	1 episode	
1988	Raw Silk	Prosecutor	TV movie	
1988	Complaints		TV pilot	
1988; 1990; 1991	The Flying Doctors	John Marshall / Ron MacKay / Frank Howard		
1989	A Country Practice	Alistair Kirby	2 episodes	
1989	The Magistrate	Jeremy	Miniseries, 2 episodes	
1990	Mission: Impossible	Sheik Abdul Faroud	1 episode	
1990	Police Crop: The Winchester Conspiracy	Sgt Franklin	TV movie	
1990	Skirts	Campbell	1 episode	
1990	Bony	Sgt Dobbs	TV movie	
1991	Boys from the Bush	Rick	1 episode	
1991	The Great Air Race (aka Half a World Away)	Commander Cole	Miniseries, 1 episode	
1991	Embassy	Geoff	1 episode	
1991	The Worst Day of My Life			
1992	The Late Show	Happy Handyman	1 episode	
1992	Bingles			
1992–1993	Neighbours	Gavin Heywood	7 episodes	
1993	Time Trax	Captain Corvo	1 episode	
1993	The Flood: Who Will Save Our Children?	Rice	TV movie	
1993	Wedlocked		TV pilot	
1993; 1996	The Feds	Roland Cloke	2 episodes	
1994	Halfway Across the Galaxy and Turn Left	Dabney Digby	1 episode	
1994–1999	Blue Heelers	Frank Davis / Alex Bailey / Jim Tully	5 episodes	
1996	Halifax f.p.	Foucault	Season 2, episode 3: "Sweet Dreams"	
1997	Good Guys, Bad Guys	Ray	1 episode	
1997	The Balanced Particle Freeway	Mizuchi / Spud (voice)	TV movie	
1997; 1998	State Coroner	Assistant Commissioner Phil Daly	3 episodes	
1999	High Flyers			
2000; 2002	Stingers	Jim Pearce / Charlie Pearce		
2001	Shock Jock	Ray	1 episode	
2002	Something in the Air	Barry	2 episodes	
2002–	Nu Country TV	Producer / director	13 episodes	
2003	MDA	Leon Corsi	1 episode	
2004	Rapid Response		TV movie	
2005	Last Man Standing	Robert	1 episode	
2005	The Secret Life of Us	Tony	1 episode	
2007	Bastard Boys	Friend	Miniseries, 1 episode	
2008	McLeod's Daughters	Groundsman	1 episode	
2011–2014	Borgia	Cardinal Giovanni Battista Savelli	6 episodes	
2012	Dangerous Remedy	Dr Bourne	TV movie	
2014	Crossing Lines	Danish man	1 episode	
2014	1864	British general	Miniseries, 1 episode	
2016	Rapa	Anglican	1 episode	
2017–2018	Britannia	Elder 2 / Elder 4	6 episodes	
2018	Lore	Pub patron	1 episode	
2019	The Hunting		Miniseries	
2021	Hanna	Neighbour	1 episode	
2022	Dangerous Liaisons	Parchment Seller	1 episode	
2023	Carnival Row	Martyrite Priest	1 episode	
2023	The Seed	Priest	1 episode	
2025	Foundation	Desperate Man	1 episode	
2026	The Pendragon Cycle: Rise of the Merlin	Old Servant	1 episode	

=== Film ===
Year	Title	Role	Notes	Ref
1982	Squizzy Taylor	Angus Murray	Feature film	
1982	The Pirate Movie	Policeman	Feature film	
1985	Channel Chaos	Sullivan	Feature film	
1985	Jenny Kissed Me	Fisherman	Feature film	
1985	Malcolm	Bank Nightwatchman	Feature film	
1985	Death of a Soldier	Billy	Feature film	
1986	With Love to the Person Next to Me	Salesman in Taxi	Feature film	
1987	Evil Angels	Macknay	Feature film	
1987	Compo	Vince Caruano	Feature film	
1989	Lover Boy	Lex	Short film	
1989	A Kink in the Picasso	Minister	Feature film	
1989	Frank		Short film	
1990	Secrets		Short film	
1992	Demi-God		Short film	
1992	A Concrete Nest	Gordon	Short film	
1993	Dusty Death		Short film	
1995	Into Each Life		Short film	
1995	River Street	Foreman	Feature film	
1996	Deathbed of an Undertaker		Short film	
1996	Driven		Short film	
1998	Pride (aka Puraido: Unmei no toki)	Counsel Brooks	Feature film (Japan)	
1998	Siam Sunset	Roy Wentworth	Feature film	
1999	Fido	Grunt (voice)	Short film	
2000	The Wog Boy	Bazza	Feature film	
2002	Razor Eaters	Hurstleigh	Feature film	
2003	A Silent History of the Blood Countess	Gyorgy Thurzo	Short film	
2005	Finctional		Short film	
2005	Einstein's Sisters	Douglas, Coach	Short film	
2005	Roughen		Short film	
2005	Trigger		Short film	
2007	Aardvark		Short film (Czech)	
2008	Head to Love		Short film (Poland)	
2008	Sněženky a machři po 25 letech	Robert	Feature film (Czech)	
2009	Beggar's Story	Writer Jan Naruda (voice)	Short film	
2009	Personality Plus		Feature film	
2010	An Application for Asylum in the Czech Republic on Ecological Grounds		Documentary film (Czech)	
2011	The Magnet	Father	Short film (Czech)	
2011	Un sueño realizado		Short film (Czech)	
2011	Léa	The Leader	Short film (Czech)	
2011	Chase, in Prose	Max Morris	Short film (Czech)	
2012	No Warranty	Alan Jones	Short film (Czech)	
2012	Catch Perfect	Ed Masters (voice)	Short film	
2012	Ivan and Maria	Ivan	Short film (Czech)	
2013	In Autumn	Peter	Short film	
2014	Vice Admiral Tordenskiold... and Dog		Feature film (Denmark)	
2015	Last Knights	Accountant	Feature film	
2015	Mr. Haslinger		Short film	
2015	The Shamer's Daughter		Feature film (Denmark / Czech)	
2015	Gangster Ka	Dr. Martier	Feature film (Czech)	
2015	Gangster Ka: African	Dr. Martier	Feature film (Czech)	
2016	Großstadtfieber (aka Big City Fever)	Der Millionär	Short film (Germany)	
2017	The Ottoman Lieutenant	Mr Clemson	Feature film	
2017	In the Cold	Nick Rose	Short film (Sweden)	
2017	Borg vs McEnroe	Umpire (McEnroe vs Connors)	Feature film (Sweden)	
2017	The Catcher Was a Spy	Boseley	Feature film	
2018	The Metamorphosis VR	Gregor Samsa's father (English voice)	Short film (Czech)	
2018	Herman	Herman	Short film (Czech)	
2019	The Shamer's Daughter 2: The Serpent Gift		Feature film (Denmark / Czech)	
2020	Confessions of a Box Man	Therapist	Feature film (Czech)	
2021	Army of Thieves	Old Security Guard Joe	Feature film	
2021	A Boy Called Christmas	Some Elf	Feature film	
2023	Extraction 2		Feature film	
2023	The Meaning and Mystery of Life	Bumblebee	Feature film (Czech)	
2023	2024	Catfish Blues	Jan	Short film (Czech)
2026	The Crystal Planet	Fangbeak 2 (voice)	Feature film	
TBA	The Tile Factory	Josef	Short film (post-production)	

=== Theatre ===
Year	Title	Role	Notes	Ref
1978	Light Shining in Buckinghamshire		Pram Factory, Melbourne with APG	
1979	Zastrozzi	Bernardo	Pram Factory, Melbourne with APG	
1979	Children's Arena Theatre			
1979	Peter Pan		Comedy Theatre, Melbourne	
1980	One of Nature's Gentlemen / The Les Darcy Show		Pram Factory, Melbourne	
1981	The Two Headed Calf	Sir Robert Clay / Jack Rivers	Pram Factory, Melbourne, University of Adelaide with APG	
1981	Steel City Sister	Slug	Pram Factory, Melbourne with APG	
1981	News Unlimited		La Mama, Melbourne	
1981	Covenant of the Rainbow		La Mama, Melbourne	
1982	Puss in Boots			
1982	Jack and the Beanstalk			
1982–1983	Curse of the Starving Class / Buried Child		The Space, Adelaide, Playbox Theatre Co	
1984	The Yellow Girl		La Mama, Melbourne	
1985	Blue Window	Norbert	St Martins Theatre, Melbourne, Alexander Theatre, Melbourne, Theatre Royal, Hobart with Playbox Theatre Co	
1985	Cyrano de Bergerac	Lackey / Pastrycook / Cadet	Arts Centre Melbourne with MTC	
1986	Breaking the Silence	Verkoff	Russell St Theatre, Melbourne with MTC	
1987	Sugar Babies	Understudy	Perth Entertainment Centre, Festival Theatre, Adelaide, Her Majesty's Theatre, Melbourne with J. C. Williamson's	
1988	Much Ado About Nothing	Dogberry	Royal Botanic Gardens Melbourne	
1989	Escape from a Better Place		Universal Theatre, Melbourne	
1989	Piaf	Narrator	Universal Theatre, Melbourne, Sydney Opera House, Canberra Theatre	
1989	A Royale Commission		Police Auditorium, Melbourne	
1989	Essington Lewis: I Am Work	Harold Darling	Church Theatre, Melbourne	
1989	Nice Girls	Gordon	Anthill Theatre, Melbourne, Alexander Theatre, Melbourne, Theatre Royal, Hobart with Playbox Theatre Co	
1990	Grass	Nicholas	Theatre Works, Melbourne	
1990	Esterhaz	Christoph Sussig	Merlyn Theatre, Melbourne with Playbox Theatre Co	
1991	A Royal Commission into the Australian Economy		Universal Theatre, Melbourne	
1992	Othello	The Duke of Venice / Lodovico	Playhouse, Melbourne with MTC	
1994	The Buddy Holly Story		Aust / NZ tour	
1995	All Souls	Joe	Merlyn Theatre, Melbourne with Playbox Theatre Co	
1995	Love Me Tender		Stage Theatre, Melbourne	
1995	Grand Final		La Mama, Melbourne	
1997	Legacy		Carlton Courthouse, Melbourne with La Mama	
1997	Alive at Williamstown Pier	Mick / Chorus	Flagship Studio, Melbourne	
1997	A Stretch of the Imagination		Comedy Club, Melbourne	
1997	The Austral/Asian Post Cartoon: Sports Edition	Video Designer	Merlyn Theatre, Melbourne	
1999	A Policewoman's Absurdity		Courthouse Theatre, Melbourne	
1999	Poetsday		La Mama, Melbourne	
2000	Certified Male	Jarrad	Star City, Sydney, Melbourne Festival	
2002	A Stretch of the Imagination		Belvoir Theatre, Sydney	
2003	Black Milk		Red Stitch Actors Theatre, Melbourne	
2003	Push Up		Red Stitch Actors Theatre, Melbourne	
2005	Oklahoma!	Cord Elam	State Theatre, Melbourne with The Production Co	
2005	Twelfth Night		Royal Botanic Gardens Melbourne with Australian Shakespeare Co	
2006	The Pajama Game	Hasler / Pop	State Theatre, Melbourne with The Production Co	
2007	Topo	Topo Rodriguez	Seymour Centre, Sydney	
2007	A Stretch of the Imagination		Carlton Courthouse, Melbourne with La Mama	
2007	42nd Street	Abner Dillon	State Theatre, Melbourne with The Production Co	
2007	The Wind in the Willows		Royal Botanic Gardens Melbourne with Australian Shakespeare Co	
2009	Crazy for You	Everett Baker	State Theatre, Melbourne with The Production Co	
2016	All's Well That Ends Drunk (Drunk Shakespeare)		Divadelni Klub, Czech	
2017	Deaf Empire: Replaying Bedřich Smetana		Kolowrat Theatre, Czech with Prague Shakespeare Company	
2017	Titus Andronicus		Kolowrat Theatre, Czech with Prague Shakespeare Company	
	The Stand In	Doktor Vypich	Cimrman English Theatre	
	The Act	Žíla	Cimrman English Theatre	
2026	Long, Wide and Short-Sighted	Old Knowitall / Giant (voice) (also director)	Cimrman English Theatre	
2026	Plum	Motyčka	Cimrman English Theatre	
2026	The Conquest of the North Pole	Karel Němec	Cimrman English Theatre	
2026	The Pub in the Glade	Professor (also director)	Cimrman English Theatre	

=== Music video ===
Year	Title	Artist	Notes	Ref
2008	You and Me	Bobby Sox	Music video clip (shot in Prague)	

=== Audio book narration ===
Year	Title	Role	Notes	Ref
1996	Home Before Dark	Narrator	Audio book	

=== Video games ===
Year	Title	Role	Ref
2009	Icycle	Dennis	
2013	Icycle: On Thin Ice	Dennis	
2015	Dex	Niles / Nestor / Soto	
2018	Kingdom Come: Deliverance	Hanush of Leipa	
2022	Way of the Hunter	Wallace Elliott Willow	
2025	Kingdom Come: Deliverance II	Hanush of Leipa / Lord of Semín	
2025	INAYAH: Life After Gods	Khonshu	
