= Westgarth, Victoria =

Neighbourhood of Northcote, Victoria, Australia

Coordinates: 37°46′49″S 144°59′57″E

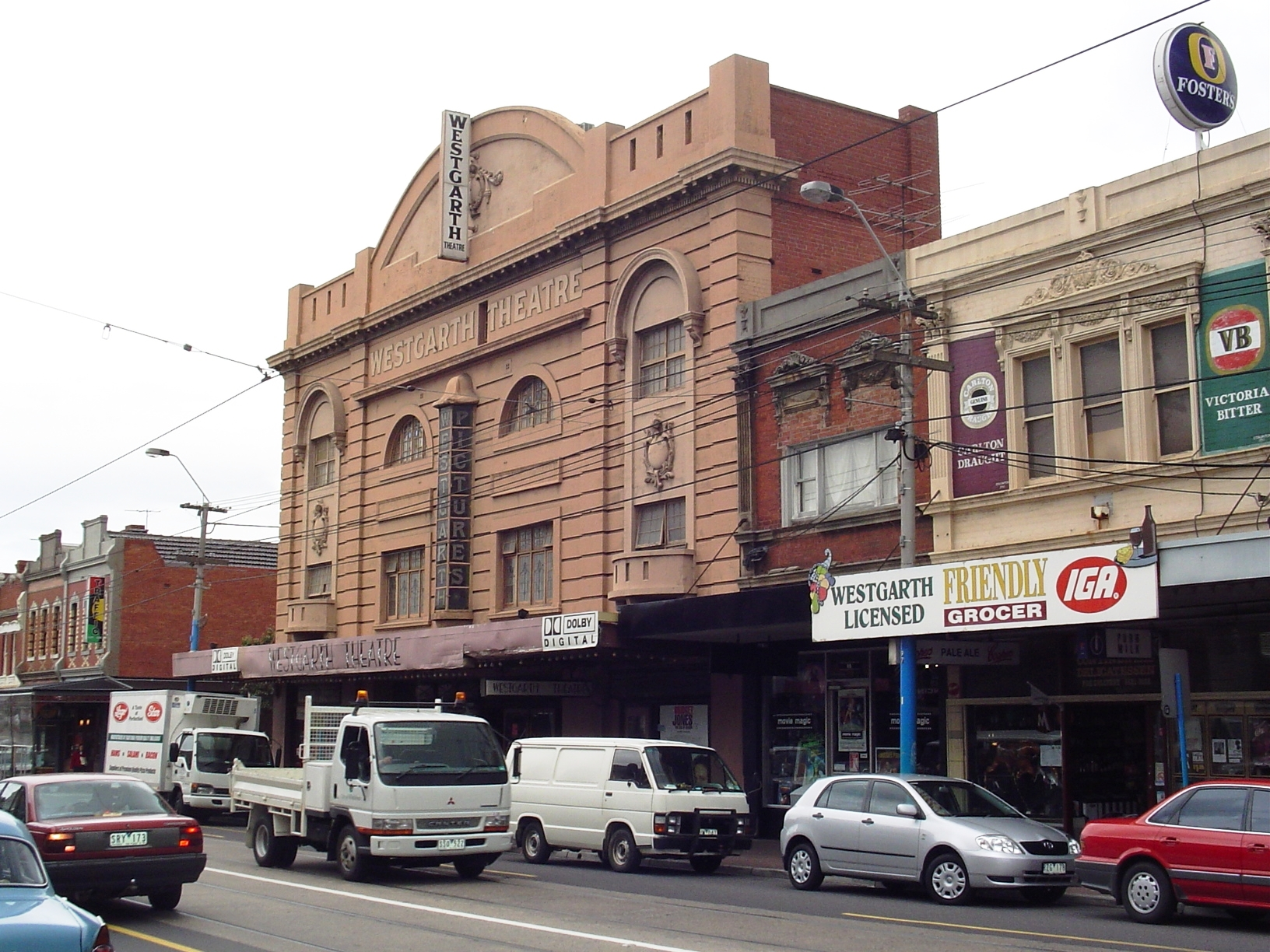
Westgarth Theatre in November 2004

Westgarth is a neighbourhood within the suburb of Northcote, about 4 or 5 kilometres (2.5 or 3.1 mi) north-east of Melbourne's central business district in Victoria, Australia. It is in the local government area of the City of Darebin. The neighbourhood has a commercial centre, distinct from the main commercial centre of Northcote, located near Westgarth railway station, just north of Clifton Hill. While Westgarth does not have any official borders, it is generally considered to extend from Merri Creek in the west to the boundary of Fairfield in the east.

== History ==
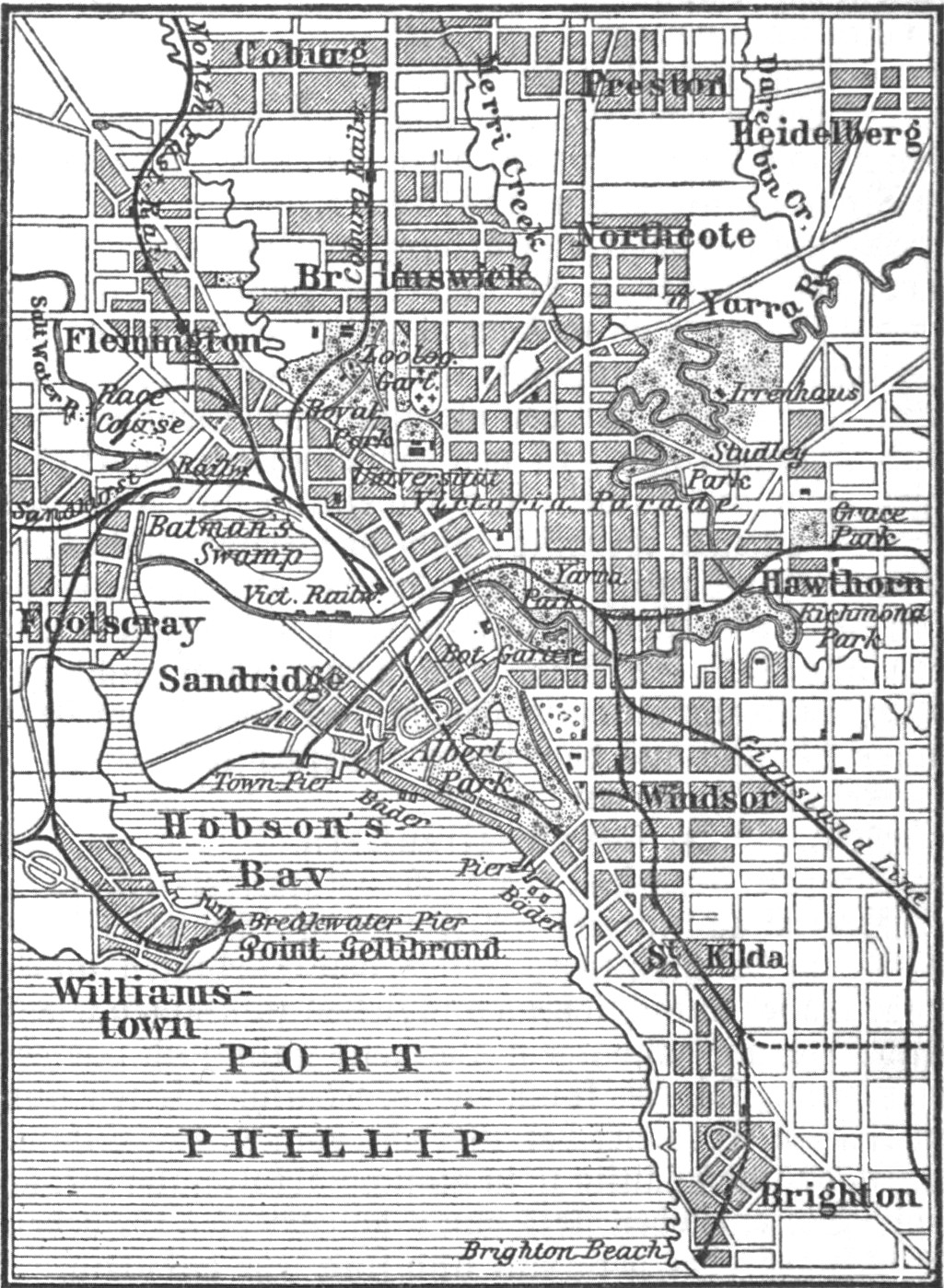
Melbourne in 1890. Westgarth is the southern part of Northcote.

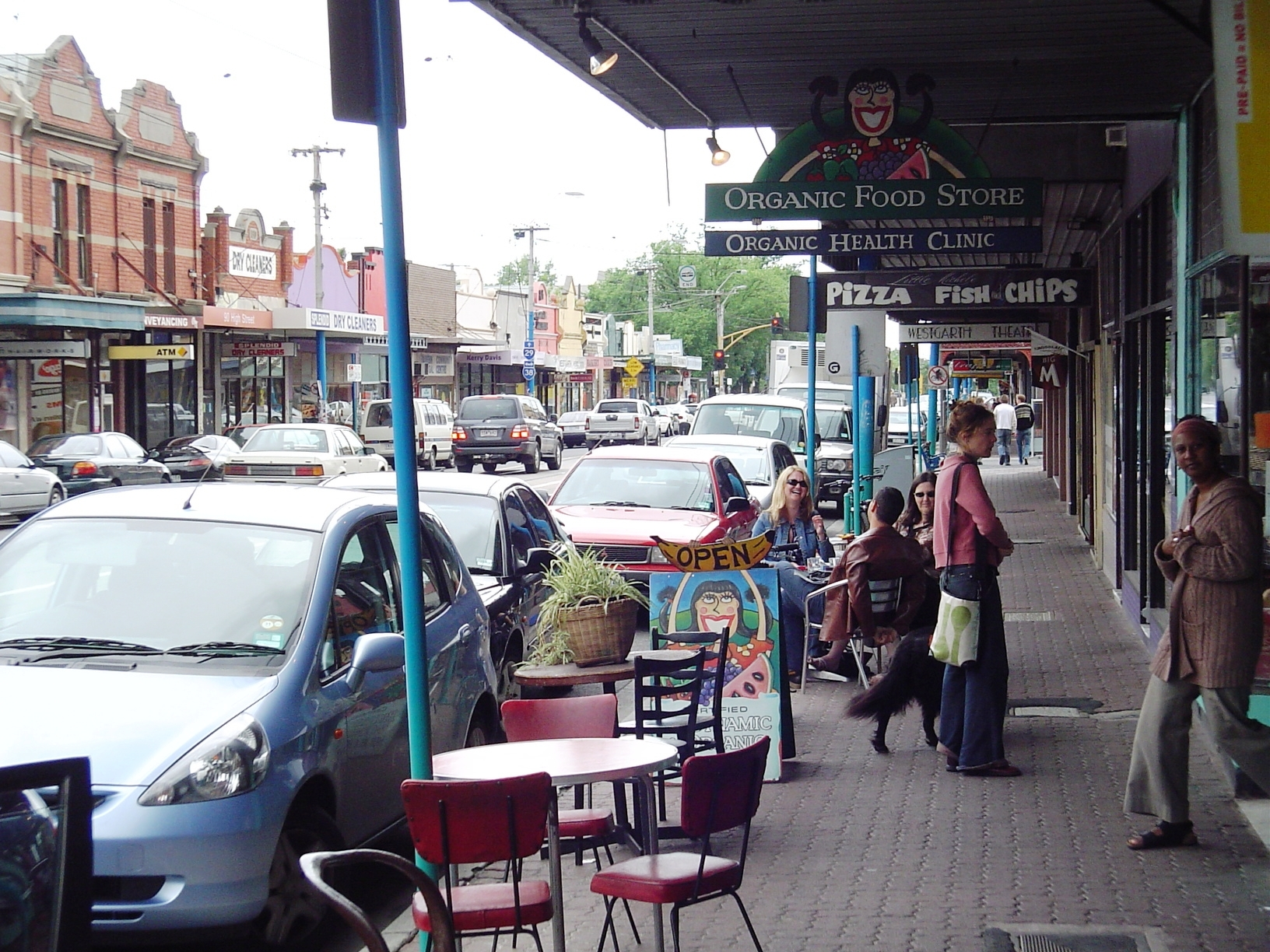
Westgarth High Street in 2004; pavements were changed to black asphalt in 2006

Terra Madre organic store and therapies shop, formerly Fruit Pedallers in 2004

Before European occupation, the area was home to the Wurundjeri people. Roughly 2 km to the south of Westgarth, where Merri Creek meets the Yarra, was a site of early colonial contact, briefly home to the Native Police Corps in 1842 and a school for Aboriginal children until 1851. The precise location of the signing of Batman's Treaty, an 1835 agreement between the early coloniser John Batman and Wurundjeri elders, which resulted in the cession of land to him, is unknown, but is thought to be at the western end of Cunningham Street on the banks of the Merri Creek. Land sales first occurred in the Northcote area in 1840, and land was purchased in the area then known as Northcote-by-the-Merri (now Westgarth), but not immediately developed. Three of the buyers later had streets named after them – Cunningham, Urquhart and Walker. A township, soon to be named Northcote, was gazetted in 1853. Development in Northcote-by-the-Merri was relatively slow compared to that of the more elevated and appealing ground beyond Ruckers Hill on High Street. As Northcote developed in the mid-to-late 19th century, Northcote-by-the-Merri became known as Northcote South. All Saints Anglican church on High Street, Westgarth, dates to 1860 and the Bridge Hotel to 1864.

Westgarth's development accelerated – along with that of many other Melbourne suburbs – in the economic boom of the 1880s. As the children of the Victorian gold rush generation formed their own families, Melbourne's population swelled. The Victorian Parliament reacted by using railway lines to open up new housing areas. The railway line from Clifton Hill to Alphington opened in 1884, and the railway station was linked to Melbourne via a western loop in 1888. A cable tram line down High Street from Clifton Hill to Thornbury opened in 1890, faltered in 1893 after the land market collapse of 1892, and opened and closed again until reopening permanently in 1901. The Northcote line was the last cable tram line to operate in Melbourne, closing on 26 October 1940. Building continued through the Edwardian era and into the 1920s, and in 1925 the Northcote tram (now route 86) was connected right through to the city centre. In 1913 the Northcote South Ratepayer's Association gained permission to install two redundant 12 ton cannons from the 1880s facing south to North Fitzroy (built by W.G. Armstrong and Co. of Newcastle-on-Tyne, UK) and they are still in place. The present commercial and shopping strip along High Street dates to the early 20th century, and Westgarth Primary School to 1925, when it opened as Westgarth Central School. The neighbourhood gained its current name between 1906 and 1910, with the decision to name the railway station after William Westgarth in December 1906. The Art Deco Westgarth Theatre, the suburb's best-known landmark, opened in 1921.

The 1960s and 1970s saw an influx of southern European immigrants to the area, in common with other City of Darebin suburbs. By the 1970s, the Westgarth Theatre catered largely to a Greek-speaking cinema audience. Westgarth school photos and class lists from the 1970s are dominated by Greek names and faces. That influence began to fade in the 1980s, with the arrival of a new generation of Westgarth residents with higher incomes and education levels. The process of gentrification accelerated in the 1990s, fuelled by the suburb's central location, attractive streets and housing stock, and its proximity to pricier inner-city suburbs including Fitzroy, Clifton Hill and Fitzroy North. The Westgarth Theatre became an art-house movie venue in 1987 when the Valhalla Cinema relocated there after the demolition of its original premises in Richmond. Ten years later, it became the Westgarth Cinema, and has been operated by Palace Cinemas since 2006. A number of industrial buildings along High Street were converted to residential use in the late 1990s and early 2000s. Westgarth Primary School's original building was demolished in 1990 and replaced by an open-plan building that was extended in 2011.

== World War II ==
A partially excavated tunnel and bunker is located in Westgarth on the north bank of Merri Creek about 30 metres downstream from where a trail crosses the stream near the southwest corner of Oldis Gardens and East Street. The tunnel entrance is locked and it is reported that it lies under a high pressure gas pipeline.

== Westgarth today ==
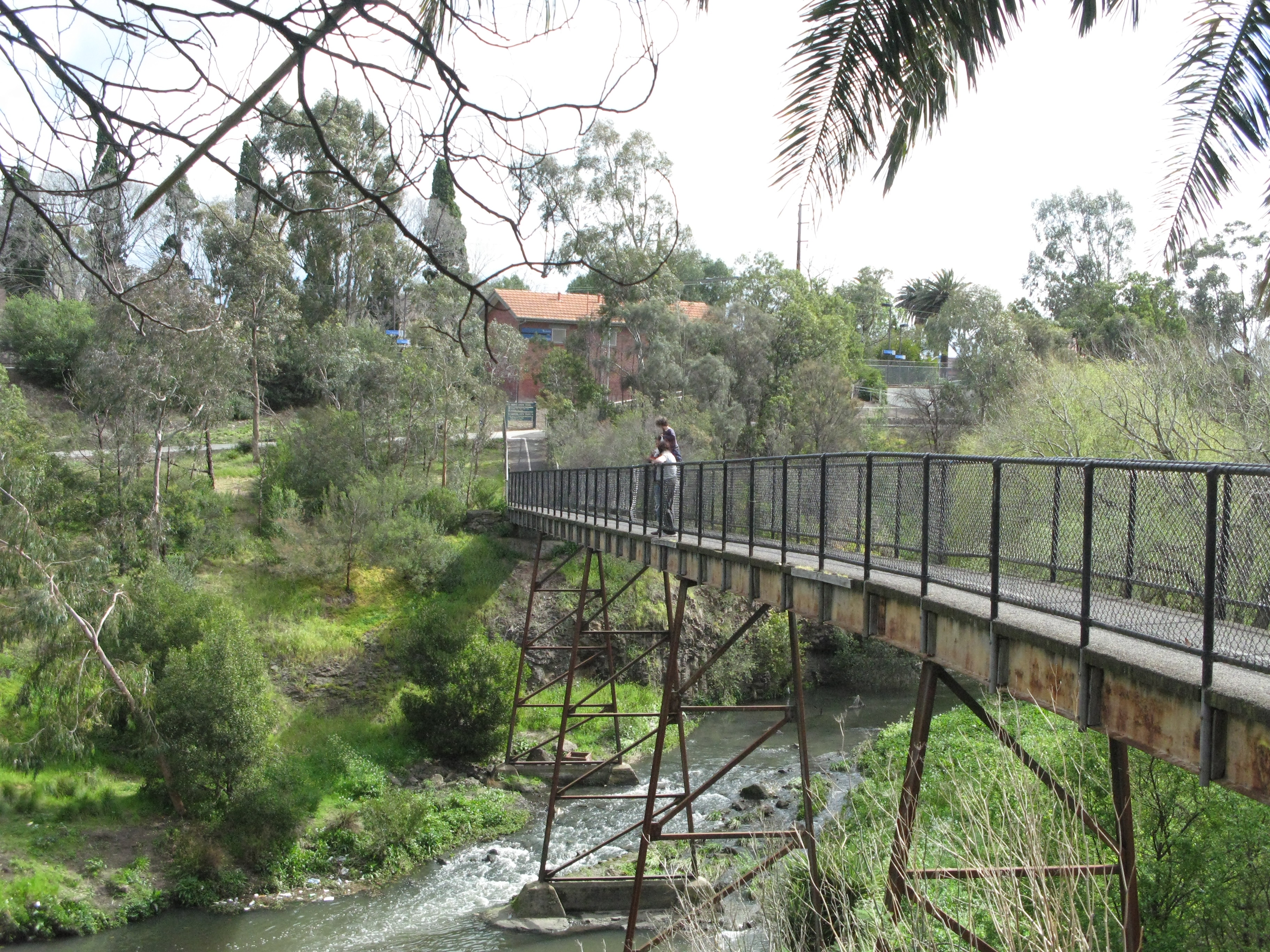
The Merri Footbridge over the Merri Creek, Westgarth/Fitzroy North

Today, Westgarth retains its southern European presence, with many children of the 1960s and 1970s immigrant wave still living in the area. But Westgarth also houses a wide variety of other cultural and language groups. Gentrification has brought back some of the children of Melbourne residents who moved to middle and outer suburbs in the 1950s and 1960s. The area is now known for its local artists and a lesbian community has also been associated with Westgarth for some years. There is a higher-than-average proportion of Subaru ownership among residents, often with a RRR and/or PBS and/or 3CR bumper sticker on the back. The best-known local resident was the Australian actor Vince Colosimo (believed now moved).

The Westgarth Cinema remains the centre of the small commercial strip at the southern end of High Street, which is now populated by bohemian fashion outlets, but mainly cafes, restaurants and a few other retail businesses. The strip remains noticeably less developed than its counterparts in Clifton Hill and Fairfield, arguably due in part to the traffic intensity of the relatively narrow High Street. New development has been rare, although new businesses open every few months and apartments above shops were constructed in 2009, 2011 and 2020. The lack of local shops means most Westgarth residents currently travel to other suburbs for groceries and many other needs. Retaining the "village" feel of Westgarth, against mounting commercial pressures to redevelop Victorian heritage buildings and development sites, was the aim of the now-defunct "Save Westgarth Village" campaign.

The Westgarth Cinema was one of the last two remaining single-screen venues in Melbourne, until being redeveloped in 2006. After several years of uncertainty about its commercial survival, the family owners finally sold the business to Palace Cinemas in 2005, while retaining ownership of the building. Although many original features have been preserved, it is now a popular multiplex with a 170-seat cinema downstairs and now four smaller cinemas upstairs.

The train line through Westgarth station is now part of the Hurstbridge line, following an easterly route into the city. A second, proximate station on the Mernda line, Rushall, is accessed via a pedestrian and cyclist bridge over the Merri Creek (the bridge connects through to an east–west cycle route along Linear Park). The High Street tram line is now part of Melbourne tram route 86. Upgrading the tram line occurred in 2011, with three stops reduced to two in Westgarth and increased dangers to cyclists and pedestrians close to the relocated central stop. The tram changes are noted in Council consultation and in many media articles and project community campaigns. In August 2013, in the last phase of the tram works, steel pyramid sculptures designed by Syrinx Environmental were added to the new median strip, producing a local outcry on social media and featuring in the national press. The Council voted to remove them again after 3 weeks.

The Jika Jika Community centre on Plant Street is the main meeting place for local events and activities.

== Education ==
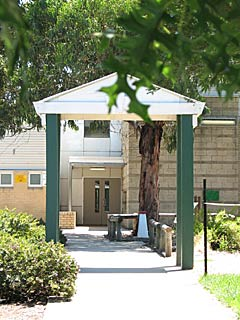
Westgarth Primary School in June 2006

Westgarth Primary School is the area's main school, although Merri Creek, Fairfield and Spensley Street Schools are closer by distance for many Westgarth residents. Westgarth Primary was founded in 1924 as Westgarth Central School, Number 4177 in the Victorian system. Originally Primary to Year 8, it eventually became primary-only. It now caters to approximately 650 students in grades from preparatory to year six. It has two campuses, Clarke St (for Grade 3-6 students), and Brooke St (for students in years Prep-2). It has a kindergarten attached to the Clarke St campus. It is one of the biggest primary schools in the region and is currently seeking government funding to redevelop its facilities to cater for significant growth in student numbers. Westgarth Primary School runs code club, robotics and other Technology workshops.

== General references ==
- Ellender, Isabel and Peter Christiansen (1999), People of the Merri Merri. The Wurundjeri in Colonial Days, Merri Creek Management Committee, East Brunswick, Victoria. ISBN 0-9577728-0-7
- Harcourt, Rex (2001), Southern invasion northern conquest : story of the founding of Melbourne, Golden Point Press, Blackburn South, Victoria. ISBN 0646403362
- Lemon, Andrew (1983), The Northcote Side of the River, City of Northcote in conjunction with Hargreen Publishing Company, North Melbourne. ISBN 0-949905-12-7
- Various authors (1992), Westgarth Memories, Published by Westgarth Primary School. See here
- Frost, Lionel (1990), Australian Cities in Comparative View, McPhee Gribble. ISBN 0-86914-187-2
- Twentyman, A. E. (1971), 'The Northcote and Preston Cable Tramway', Running Journal, October 1971, Tramway Museum Society of Victoria
