= The Fast Lane =

Television series

- Genre: Comedy
- Starring: Terry Bader; Richard Healy; Debra Lawrance; Peter Hosking
- Country of origin: Australia
- Original language: English
- No. of seasons: 2
- No. of episodes: 20

Production
- Producer: Noel Price
- Production company: ABC

Original release
- Network: ABC
- Release: 8 March 1985 – 29 December 1986

The Fast Lane is an Australian television show that aired between 1985 (Season 1) and 1986 (Season 2) on the Australian Broadcasting Corporation (ABC).

The Fast Lane was created by John Clarke and Andrew Knight and starred Terry Bader, Richard Healy, Debra Lawrance and Peter Hosking.

According to Debra Lawrance on ABC 774 Radio's 'The Conversation Hour' on 15 October 2015 (about 26 minutes into the file), the ABC taped over the master Umatic tapes. ABC archives however, advised (on 21 September 2021) that they hold copies of the entire series.

== Plot ==
This comedy series follows two private investigators, Bryce (Terry Bader) and Ken (Richard Healy), who run a firm known as the 'Excelsior Research Foundation'. They are assisted by Pat (Debra Lawrance), their receptionist.

Bryce thinks he is smart and boasts about his elite private school background, but is actually very stupid and fails to understand what is really happening around him. He dropped out of law school in the second year. Ken is the down-to-earth blue-collar member of the team, but they both usually get into deep trouble. Pat is the sensible and smart one, but the others don't recognise this. She and Detective Sergeant Blair (Peter Hosking) usually rescue them and clean up after them.

The plots are a black comedy and satire. The agency is desperate for work and usually takes on small cases involving simple detective work (e.g. domestic disputes). Bryce and Ken stumble around trying to solve it – mostly when Bryce takes the obviously wrong approach – and getting deeper into trouble. Meanwhile Pat does the real detective work and uncovers a bigger crime that is linked to the small case (e.g. corporate crime). Although Pat discovers the real criminals, they often escape prosecution because of loopholes in the law or they are too powerful to touch. In the end, the simple case is wrapped up and Bryce undeservedly takes the credit for it. But the audience and Pat realise the injustice, because the wrap-up usually results in the innocent becoming the victim and the real criminals getting away with it.

== Cast ==
=== Main ===
- Terry Bader as Bryce
- Richard Healy as Ken
- Debra Lawrance as Pat
- Peter Hosking as Detective Sergeant Blair

=== Guests ===
Actor	Role
Alan Fletcher	Collins
Alethea McGrath	Old Woman
Alex Menglet	Harwood
Anne Phelan	Beth
Arna-Maria Winchester	Factory owner's wife
Barry Otto	Professor Daniells
Bryan Marshall	Kingdom
Bud Tingwell	Bertie
Christian Manon	Sam
Deborra-Lee Furness	Stella
Edward Hepple	Sherwood
Esben Storm	Lester
Fiona Corke	Susie
Fiona Spence	Peg
Gary Day	Keel
Geneviève Picot	Miriam
George Kapiniaris	Arly
Gerard Maguire	Bill Martin
Heather Mitchell	Eileen
Jackie Woodburne	Ruth
Jacqui Gordon	Megan
Jane Turner	Waitress
Jean Kittson	Reporter 1
Joe Camilleri	Santini
John Clarke	Barry Tanner, race caller (voice)
John Flaus	Jim
John Gregg	Adrian
Kim Gyngell	Lynch
Kris McQuade	Zola
Lynda Gibson	Magda
Magda Szubanski	Sue
Mark Mitchell	Derek
Melita Jurisic	Maria
Neil Melville	Wallace
Nina Landis	
Norman Yemm	Fellows
Pamela Rabe	
Peter Curtin	Lance
Ralph Cotterill	Pim
Reg Evans	Dr Chisholm
Reg Gorman	Lou
Robert Coleby	Dwyer
Ross Newton	Robby Williams
Stephen Grives	Douglas
Sue Jones	Williams
Terry Gill	Mayor
Tina Bursill	Felicity
Tommy Dysart	Neville
Wilbur Wilde	
William Zappa	Steve

== Production credits ==
Producer: Noel Price

Directors: Colin Budds, Peter Dodds, Mark Joffe, Noel Price, Mandy Smith

Written by: Andrew Knight, John Clarke (and others)

Music: Greg Sneddon

Locations: All shows were shot in Melbourne

== Episodes ==
According to John Clarke's CV, there were 19 episodes in total.

=== Season 1 (1985) ===
These episodes were run on ABC Channel 2 at 8:55 pm on Thursday nights. A review in the Sydney Morning Herald mentions the episodes were to run on Fridays, but the ABC changed their mind, and ran the series on Thursdays instead. Note: all episodes of Series 1 are known to exist in the form of VHS Rips available online.

No. in season	Title	Written by	Original release date
1	"Confusion by Numbers"	John Clarke and Andrew Knight	7 March 1985
Bryce and Ken are hired to perform as security at a wedding — guarding the presents. There, an old friend hires Bryce and Ken for a lucrative accounting investigation. Pat arrives in Melbourne and finds work after the newspaper misprints Bryce and Ken's ad for a secretary under rooms for rent.
2	"Upping the Integrity"	John Clarke and Andrew Knight	14 March 1985
The Excelsior Research Foundation is hired by an advertising agency to investigate the theft of a marketing campaign. Bryce finds his spiritual home in the advertising industry, while Ken cons a favour from Pat by getting her to enrol in a modelling course to expose the company's business practices.
3	"A Mug's Game"	John Clarke and Andrew Knight	21 March 1985
A small town drainage authority hires Bryce and Pat to investigate clerical corruption in a regional town. A lucky gambler runs afoul of townsfolk in the local pub. Meanwhile, Ken tries to sort out a few personal problems. John Clarke is (off-camera) as the race caller.
4	"Tertiary Sisyphus"	John Clarke and Andrew Knight	28 March 1985
A case of mistaken identity leads to Ken going undercover as an academic after he and Bryce are hired to examine the reason for the suspiciously high pass-rate in a difficult university English course. This ep. has Barry Otto as the professor
5	"Irreconcilable Similarities"	John Clarke and Andrew Knight	4 April 1985
An analytical man hires the Excelsior Research Foundation to investigate his wife's extramarital liaisons. Pat steps in to deliver a package on behalf of Bryce and Ken getting all three involved in a dangerous drug ring
6	"Portrait of Whistler's Underwriter"	John Clarke and Andrew Knight	11 April 1985
A friend of Bryce's father hires the Excelsior Research Foundation to investigate thefts from his private art collection. This episode has John Clarke himself playing a guest role.
7	"The Sound of One Hand Counting"	John Clarke and Andrew Knight	18 April 1985
Pat is sent to work undercover in a factory to investigate thefts from the shop floor. Bryce and Ken are assigned to investigate the callous factory manager's wife only to find themselves participating in a New Age self-improvement course
8	"The Below Average Samaritan"	John Clarke and Andrew Knight	25 April 1985
Bryce matches wits with a streetwise teenage entrepreneur who has half his years and twice his skills, and Ken is asked to be best man at his former wife's wedding.
9	"All's Well That Himfella Buggerup Finish"	John Clarke and Andrew Knight	2 May 1985
Interpol, Mr Big, murder, heroin and intrigue form just another day's work for the bumbling duo at Excelsior who prove once again that when the going gets tough they are completely out of their league.

=== Season 2 (1987) ===
These episodes were run on ABC Channel 2 on Tuesday nights at 9:20 pm. Note: Episodes 1, 2 and 3 are NOT known to exist as VHS rips available online, whereas the others are.

No. in season	Title	Written by	Original release date
1	"Should Auld Acquaintances Be Given a Fairly Wide Berth"	John Clarke and Andrew Knight	27 October 1987
Bryce and Ken are recruited by the Ministry for Cultural Advancement to track down a couple of esoteric, cultural fringe-dwellers who have absconded with their grants for 'Celebrate Australia Day'
2	"Following by Example"	Andrew Knight	3 November 1987
The coach of an amateur football club, impressed with Bryce's new ideals on personal motivation, hires him to boost the team's morale.
3	"Charming Little Bijou Enterprise in Prime Position - Suit Magistrate"	Max Dann	10 November 1987
Keel, an unscrupulous real estate agent, has persuaded a woman and her retarded son to sell their home for far below its real price, so Keel can benefit by its resale. Keel's assistant, Portman, fed up with his boss and his crafty schemes, enlists the help of Ken and Bryce to carry out a careful plan.
4	"Holding the Mirror Up to Itself"	John Alsop and Andrew Knight	17 November 1987
When Bryce and Ken go in search of an old man's missing greyhound, an actor (who has the role of a private detective in a TV series) goes along with them to see how real detectives work. Needing an impressive case, Bryce makes up a story about a diamond heist so they can "recover" the stolen goods. Meanwhile, Pat runs into bureaucratic roadblocks when she takes up the cause of a couple whose house is being affected by an excavation on the neighbouring council-owned property.
5	"Murder Most Fouled"	Robyn Walton	24 November 1987
Bryce, Ken and Pat go undercover at a country guesthouse to solve a series of antique thefts. Before long, Bryce reveals his true identity to investigate a murder — a difficult task given he has no body, no clues, and no shortage of suspects.
6	"The Gods Must Be Extremely Badly Advised"	Deborah Parsons	1 December 1987
Bryce and Ken are hired to provide market research for a confectionery company and find themselves in the middle of a union dispute
7	"Rosencrantz & Guildernstern Aren't Very Well"	John Clarke, Richard Healy & Andrew Knight	8 December 1987
Ken and Bryce are on the hook for costly repairs after they are hired to de-bug a suburban home. The pair are then approached to make a dead drop on behalf of a popular talk radio host who is being blackmailed over his illegitimate child. When the man who picks up the money is later found dead, Ken and Bryce are arrested for murder. (Added writing credit: based on a phone call from Geoff Kelso)
8	"All the World's Going Through a Bit of a Stage"	Robyn Walton	15 December 1987
Ken and Bryce are hired to discover the identity of a mystery playwright
9	"My Dinner with Agnes"	Max Dann and Andrew Knight	22 December 1987
Ken and Bryce attempt to serve a summons on a marathon-running security guard.
10	"Je Regrette Tout"	John Alsop and Andrew Knight	29 December 1987
An Irishman is sent to Melbourne on a mission involving an ecumenical conference. When the suspected terrorist misses his contact at the airport, he happens across an ad for the Excelsior Research Foundation and hires them to locate her. With Pat making plans to get married and move overseas, Ken and Bryce both make their feelings known.
