= Siam Sunset =

- Theatrical release poster
- Directed by: John Polson
- Written by: Max Dann; Andrew Knight
- Produced by: Al Clark
- Starring: Linus Roache; Danielle Cormack; Peter Hosking
- Cinematography: Brian Breheny
- Edited by: Nicholas Beauman
- Music by: Paul Grabowsky
- Production companies: Artist Services; Showtime Australia; Channel 4 Films; New South Wales Film and Television Office
- Distributed by: United International Pictures
- Release dates: May 1999 (Cannes); 9 September 1999 (Australia)
- Running time: 91 minutes
- Country: Australia
- Language: English
- Box office: $878,819 (Australia)

Siam Sunset is a 1999 Australian comedy film directed by John Polson and starring Linus Roache and Danielle Cormack.

== Plot ==
Perry (Linus Roache) is an English chemist working for a paint company and is depressed after losing his wife in a freak accident. As he tries to invent the new colour Siam Sunset, he wins a prize, takes leave, and travels to Australia. Grace (Danielle Cormack), on the same tour bus, also has a troubled life. When they meet, the two begin a romance.

== Cast ==
- Linus Roache as Perry
- Danielle Cormack as Grace
- Victoria Hill as Maree
- Peter Hosking as Roy Wentworth
- Ian Bliss as Martin
- Roy Billing as Bill Leach
- Deidre Rubenstein as Celia Droon
- Victoria Eagger as Rowena Wentworth

== Release ==
Siam Sunset premiered at the 1999 Cannes Film Festival. It grossed $878,819 at the box office in Australia.

== Reception ==
Rotten Tomatoes reports that 67% of nine surveyed critics gave the film a positive review; the average rating is 6.1/10. David Stratton of Variety wrote that the film's concept is unoriginal, but it is a "merrily entertaining, frequently funny and occasionally violent" film that improves on the formula used by recent films.
