= Channel Chaos =

- Directed by: Barry Peak
- Written by: Barry Peak; Chris Kieley
- Produced by: Chris Kiely
- Starring: Jay Hackett; Tim Scally; Lyn Semmler
- Cinematography: Malcolm Richards
- Production company: Hatful Productions
- Distributed by: THG Video (video)
- Release date: 1985
- Running time: 90 minutes
- Country: Australia
- Language: English
- Budget: A$400,000

Channel Chaos is a 1985 Australian film set at a TV station.

== Cast ==
- Jay Hackett
- Tim Scally
- Lyn Semmler
- Peter Moon as Dick Jones
- Peter Hosking as Sullivan
- Tiriel Mora as Police Officer

== Plot ==
The actors of the TV series Copfile investigate when their scriptwriter is killed.

== Production ==
The film was the second of four movies made by the team of Barry Peak and Chris Kiely who ran the Valhalla Cinemas in Sydney and Melbourne. The movie was known in production as A Hatful of Arseholes and the budget was raised through 10BA. Peak and Kiely hated the movie when they finished and decided not to screen it in their own cinema.
