= Teresa Furtado =

British actress

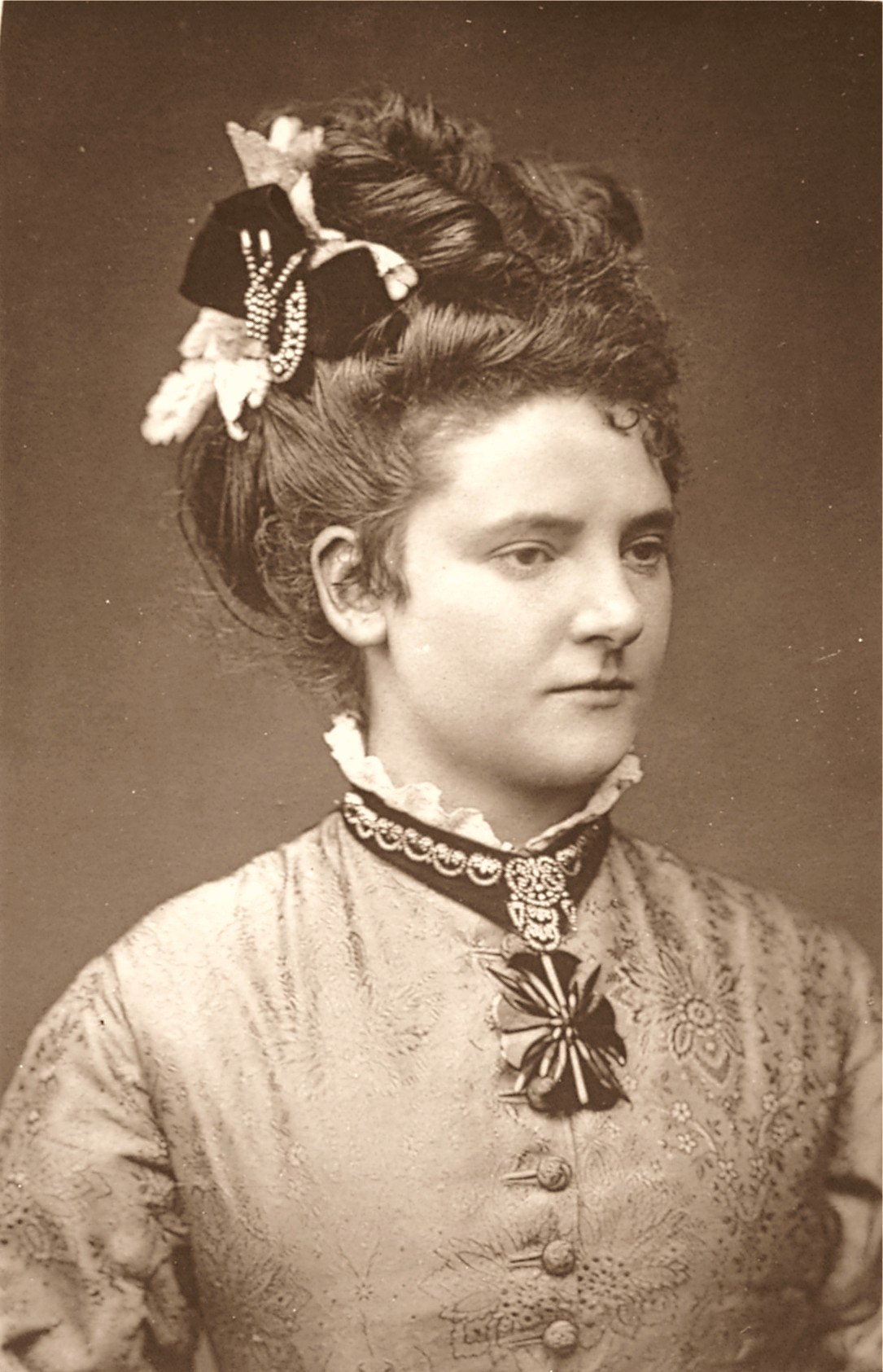
Teresa Furtado

Teresa Elizabeth Furtado (c. 1845 – 9 August 1877) was an actress at London's Adelphi Theatre where she played leading melodramatic roles for nine seasons.

She was the daughter of Charles Furtado, professor of music in London and composer of ballads. Her appearances at the Adelphi included No Thoroughfare by Wilkie Collins and Charles Dickens (1868) and Esmeralda in Notre-Dame or, The Gipsy Girl of Paris, a dramatized version of Victor Hugo's The Hunchback of Notre-Dame (1875). She also appeared in the premieres of two early works by W.S. Gilbert – as Pocahontas in his 1867 burlesque, Robinson Crusoe at the Haymarket Theatre and as Jenny Wren in his 1867 pantomime, Harlequin Cock Robin and Jenny Wren at the Lyceum Theatre.

In 1873 she married the English actor, John Clarke. Her premature death at the age of 32 led to his breakdown and he died less than two years later. She was buried on the western side of Highgate Cemetery.

== Sources ==
- McHugh, Frank, The 1872-1873 Season, The Adelphi Theatre 1806 - 1910.
- Sherson, Erroll, London's lost theatres of the nineteenth century, Ayer Publishing, 1925, p. 274. ISBN 0-405-08969-4.
- Stedman, Jane W., W.S. Gilbert: a classic Victorian and his theatre Oxford University Press, 1996. ISBN 0-19-816174-3
- Stephen, Leslie, ed. (1887). "Clarke, John (d.1879)" . Dictionary of National Biography. Vol. 10. London: Smith, Elder & Co. pp. 434–435.
