= Astor Theatre, Melbourne =

Historic cinema in St Kilda, Victoria

The Astor Theatre
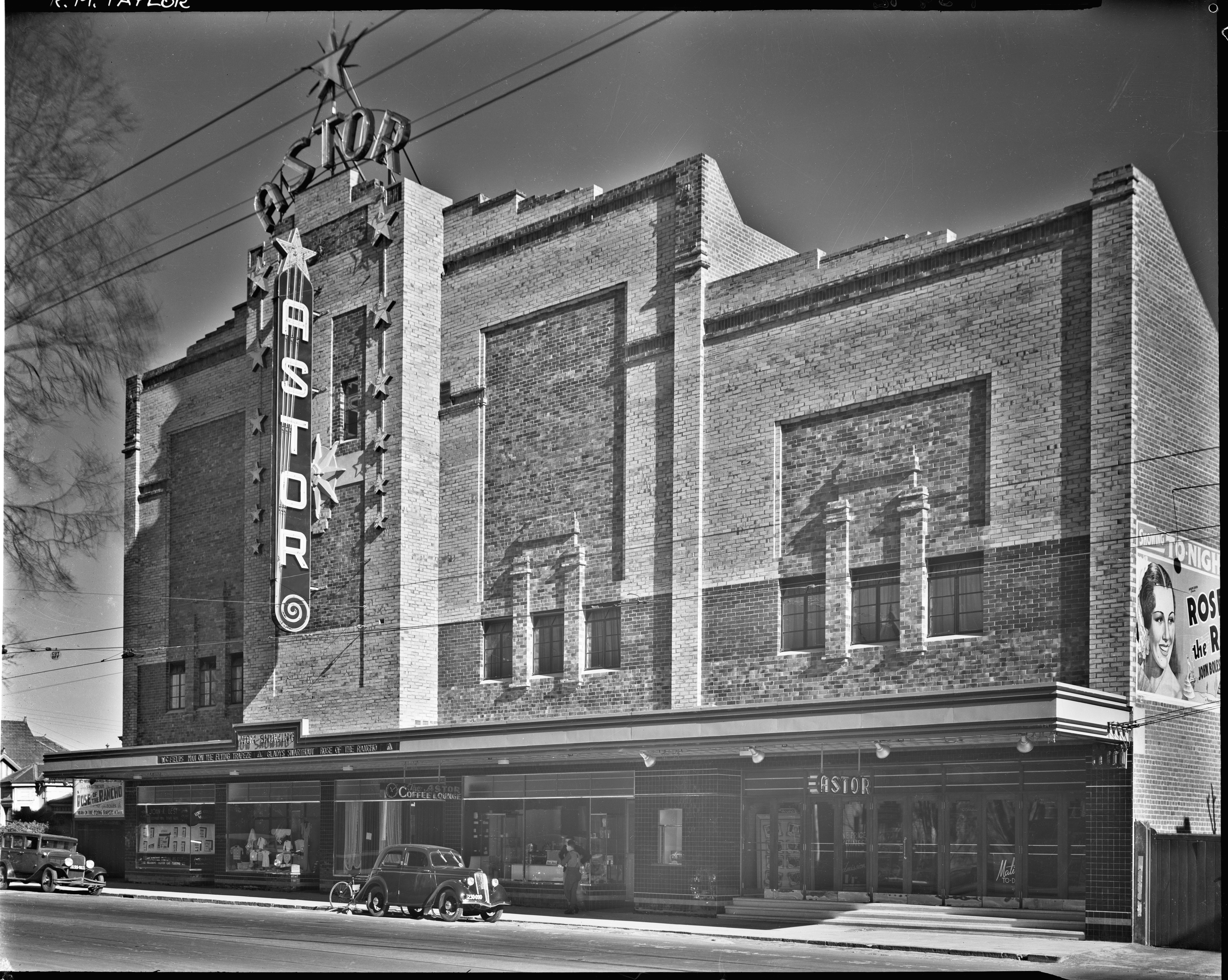
- The Astor, circa 1936.

General information
- Architectural style: Jazz moderne
- Location: Chapel Street, St Kilda (Melbourne), Victoria, Australia
- Coordinates: 37.85806°S 144.99194°E
- Current tenants: Palace Cinemas
- Construction started: December 1935
- Completed: 3 April 1936
- Owner: Ralph Taranto

Design and construction
- Architect: Ron Morton Taylor

The Astor Theatre is a classic, single-screen jazz moderne revival movie theatre in the Melbourne suburb of St Kilda, first opened in 1936 and still in operation today.

== History ==
The site at 1-3 Chapel Street, St Kilda has been used for entertainment purposes since the Diamond Picture Theatre opened there on 29 July 1912. It was later renamed the Theatre Rex and closed in 1917. Astor founder Frank O'Collins bought the property in 1935, commissioning architect Ron Morton Taylor who designed the building in the jazz moderne style. Construction work began within a few months, led by the Clements Langford firm.

The Astor officially opened on 3 April 1936 with a seating capacity of 1,673 people. Notably it was one of the last theatres in Melbourne to use the traditional two-level auditorium layout, a costly approach that later fell out of favour. The cinema operated throughout World War II and the post-war era, mostly showing big-name American films from the major studios such as MGM, Paramount and United Artists.

In 1969, the Astor was bought by Tanda Investments and became one of 12 cinemas in Melbourne that played only Greek language films. In the early 1980s, demand from the Greek community declined due to home video and the introduction of SBS, leading to the Astor's brief closure in 1982.

It reopened in 1983 under the leadership of George Florence, who debuted the theatre's new incarnation with a screening of 1933's King Kong. Florence initiated the programming style of the Astor that continues to this day, and designed the classic "calendar" session posters which became popular pin-ups in homes across Melbourne. During this era, the theatre's capacity was reduced to 1,200 so that a stage could be installed for live performances. Many concerts were then held at the Astor throughout the 1980s, including INXS, Midnight Oil and Siouxsie and the Banshees.

In 1998, the Astor was heritage listed by the National Trust. The Trust noted that:

The Astor has historical and social significance for its associations with perhaps the most important mass entertainment of the twentieth century, the cinema. The scale of the theatre and the quality of its decoration evoke the popularity and glamour of cinema as entertainment, particularly during the heyday of cinema in the 1930s. The Astor Theatre, with its Moderne design, spacious foyers and its many original furnishings, objects and surviving early signage, symbolises the suburban cinema experience during the inter-war years when cinema-going reached its peak.

In 2007, the Astor was bought for $3.8 million by St Michael's Grammar School, who left the cinema operating under Florence's guidance but intended to redevelop the building as a performing arts centre. The "Friends of the Astor" community group was formed in response and 12,000 signatures were obtained on a "Save the Astor" petition. The building was then sold again to businessman Ralph Taranto, but disputes with Florence led to the announcement that the Astor would close in 2015. However, this did not eventuate as Palace Cinemas agreed to become the new tenant. There were fears that the building would be divided into three screens, as had been done at the Westgarth Theatre in Northcote, but Palace insisted they were committed to keep the Astor running in its traditional form. Palace CEO Benjamin Zeccola was quoted as saying:

Different rules apply to the Astor... It has an important role to play, not just as a revival cinema or a repertory cinema, but also as an educational institution. It’s a place where school bookings are held. It’s a tourist attraction. It’s a great venue for things such as film festivals, corporate events and weddings. There are a lot of reasons to keep it a single screen.

The Astor is still operating as of 2025. The theatre is currently managed by film critic Zak Hepburn.

== Gallery of photos of the theatre, circa 1936 ==
Despite a few relatively minor alterations and the passage of close to 90 years, the building has survived almost entirely intact from how it appeared on its first day of operation. This is demonstrated in the below photos, taken by photographer Lyle Fowler shortly after the Astor first opened in 1936.

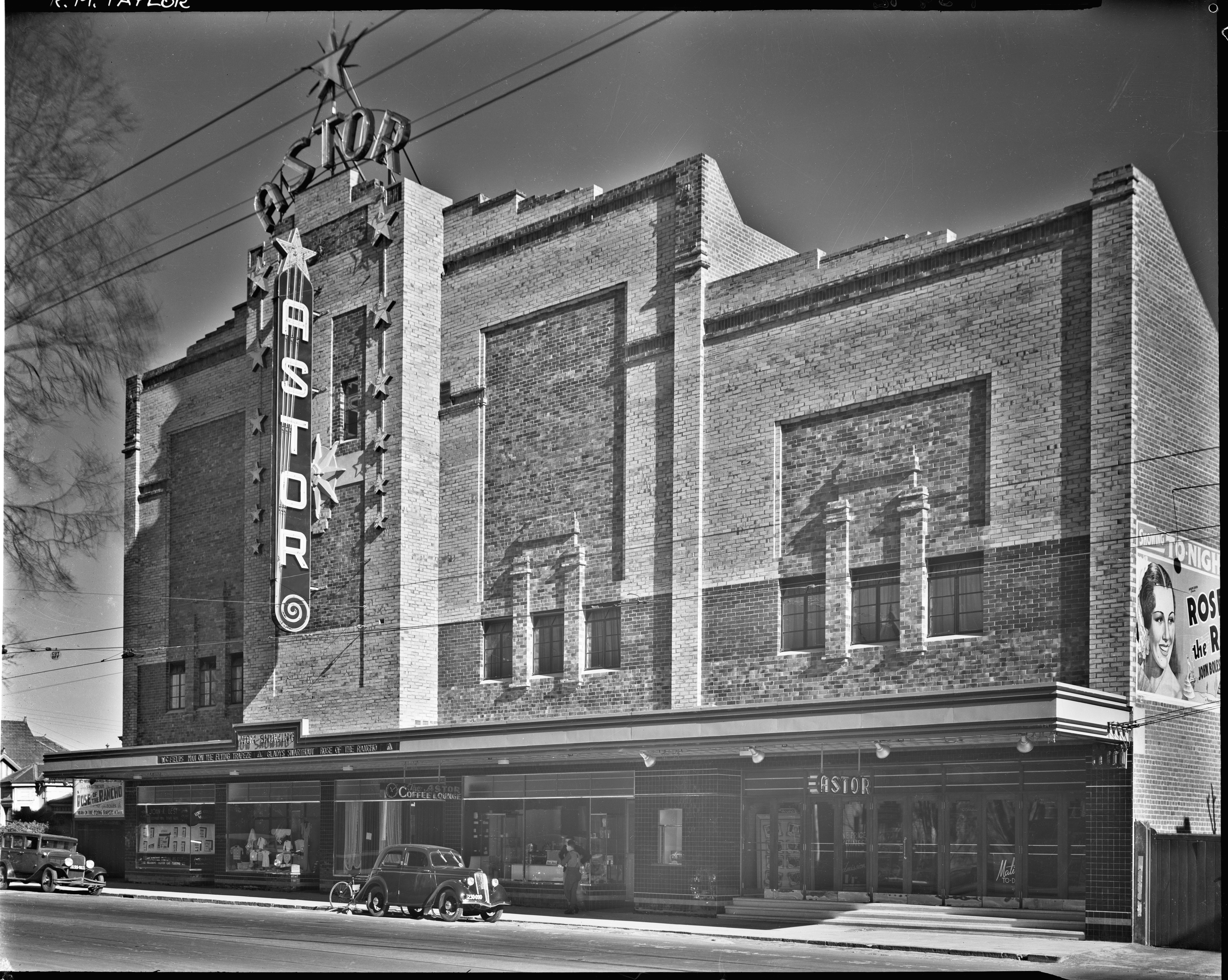
The Astor from across the street.

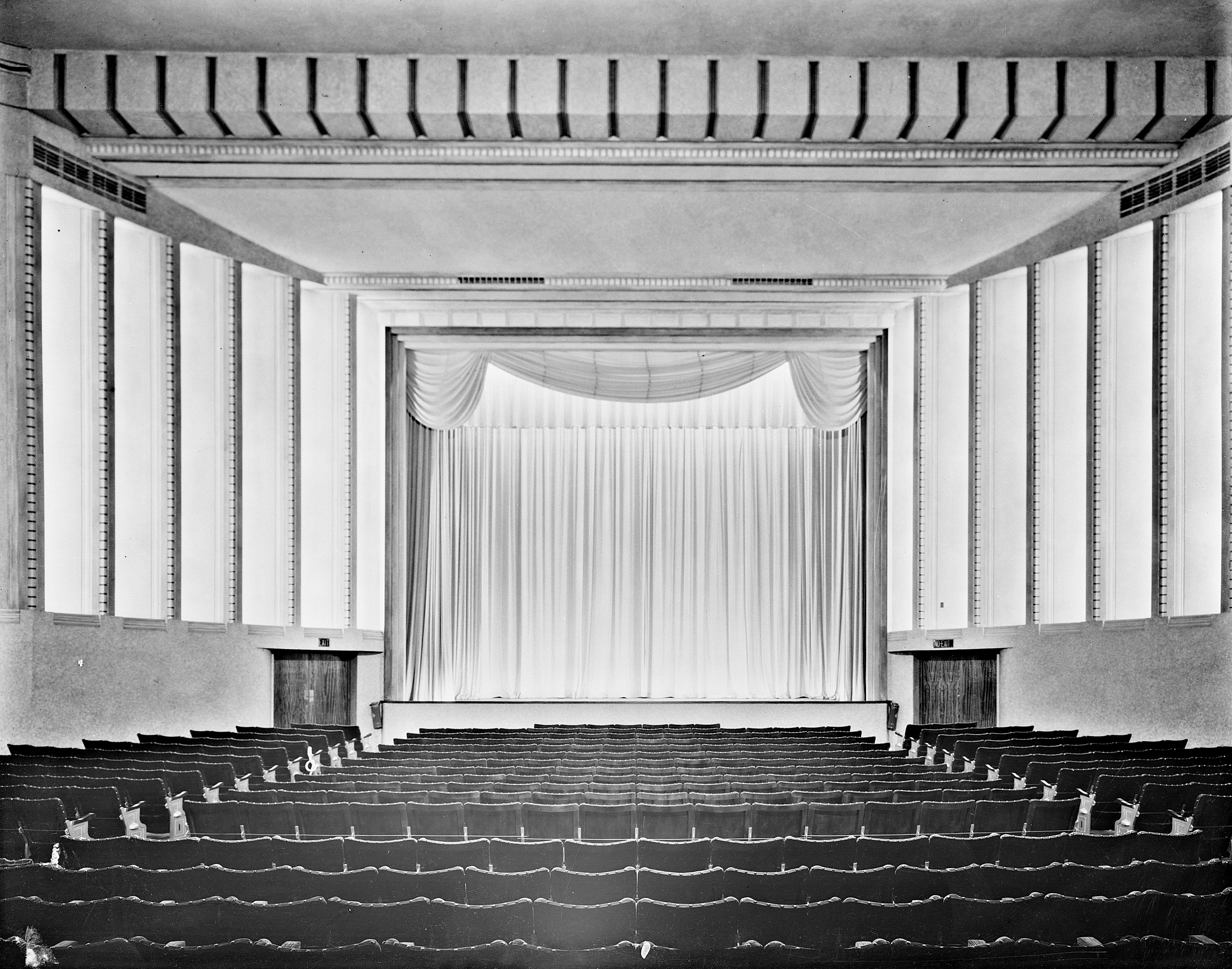
The seats, curtains and screen inside the theatre itself.

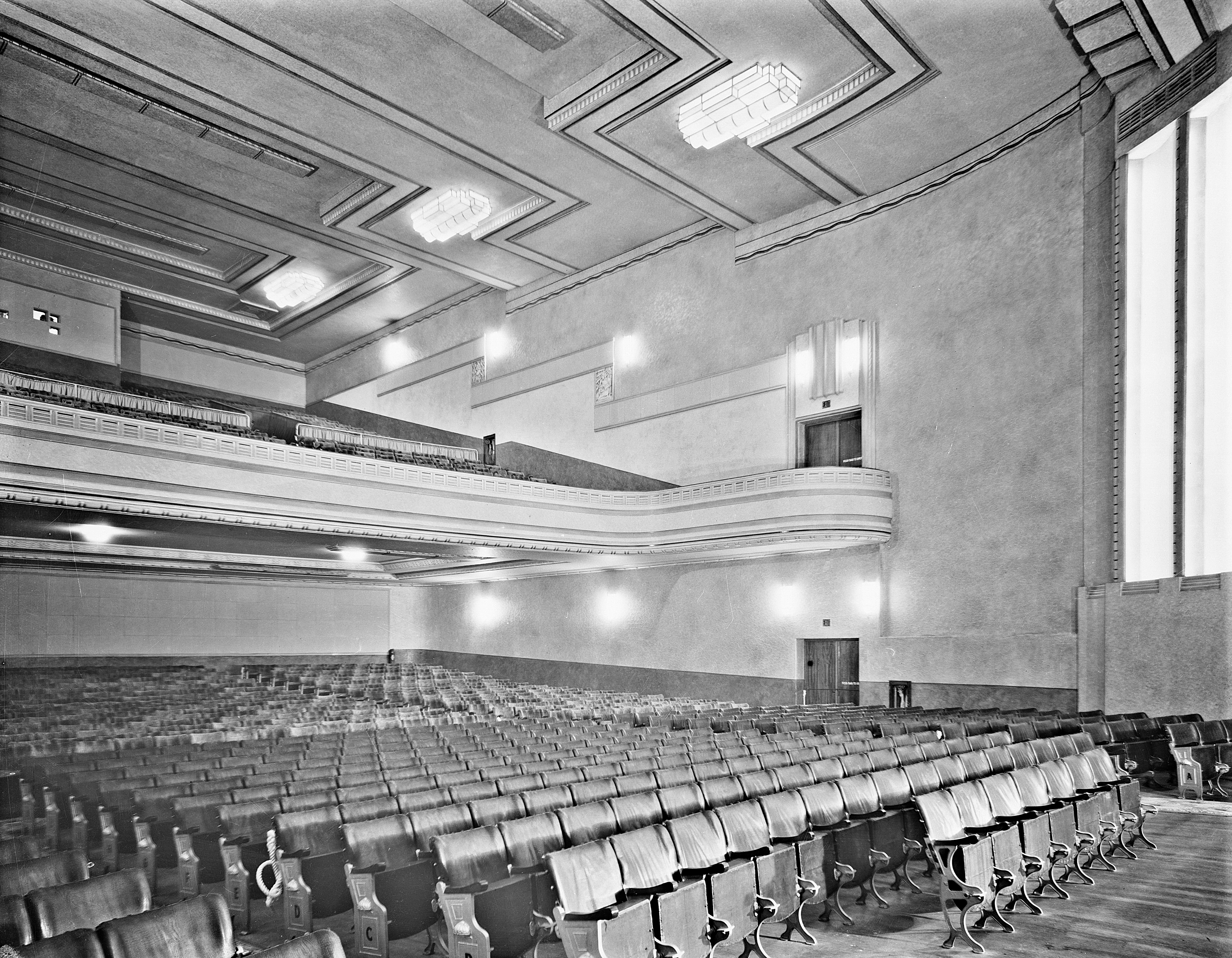
View of the seats and upstairs stalls from under the screen.

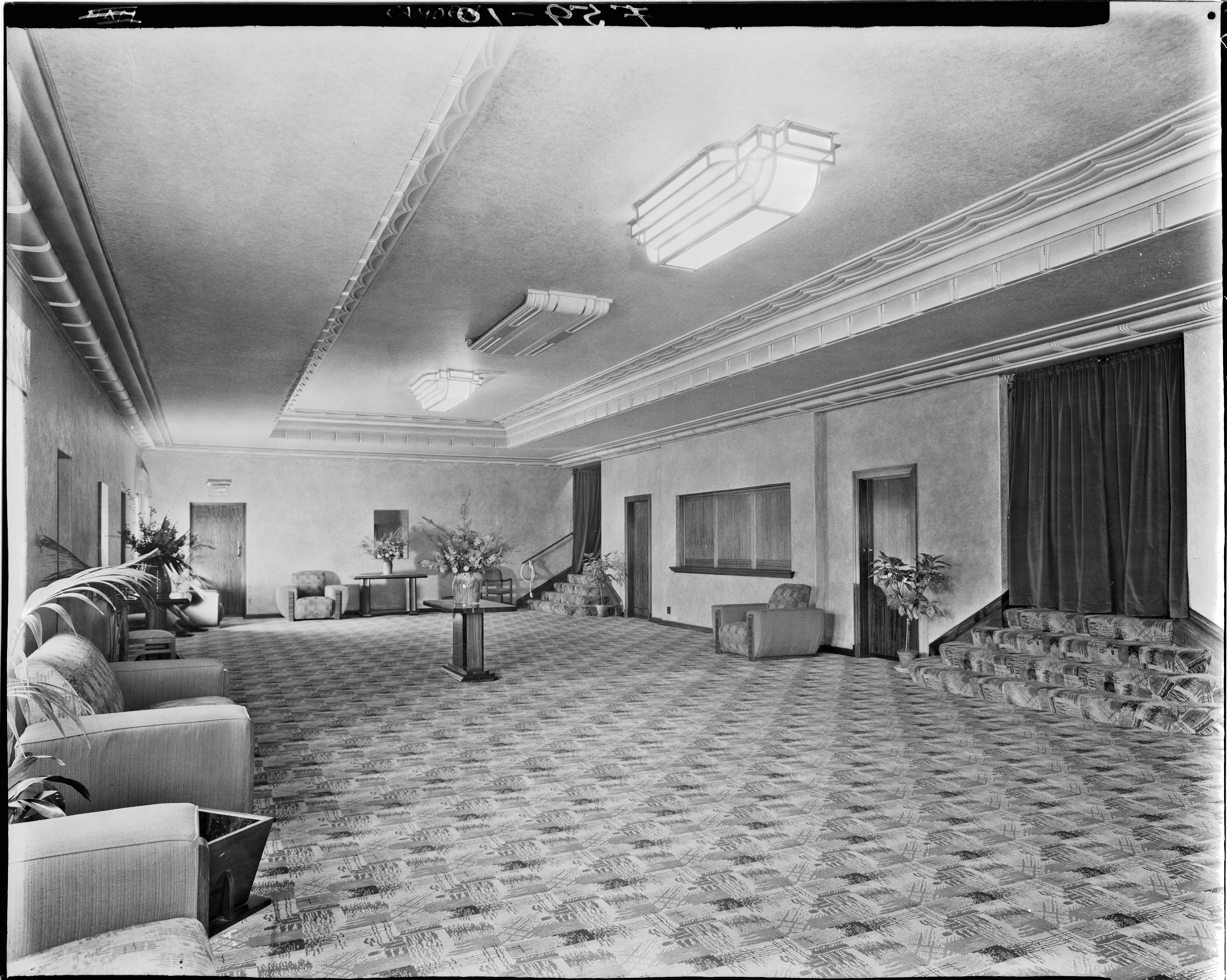
The upstairs foyer.

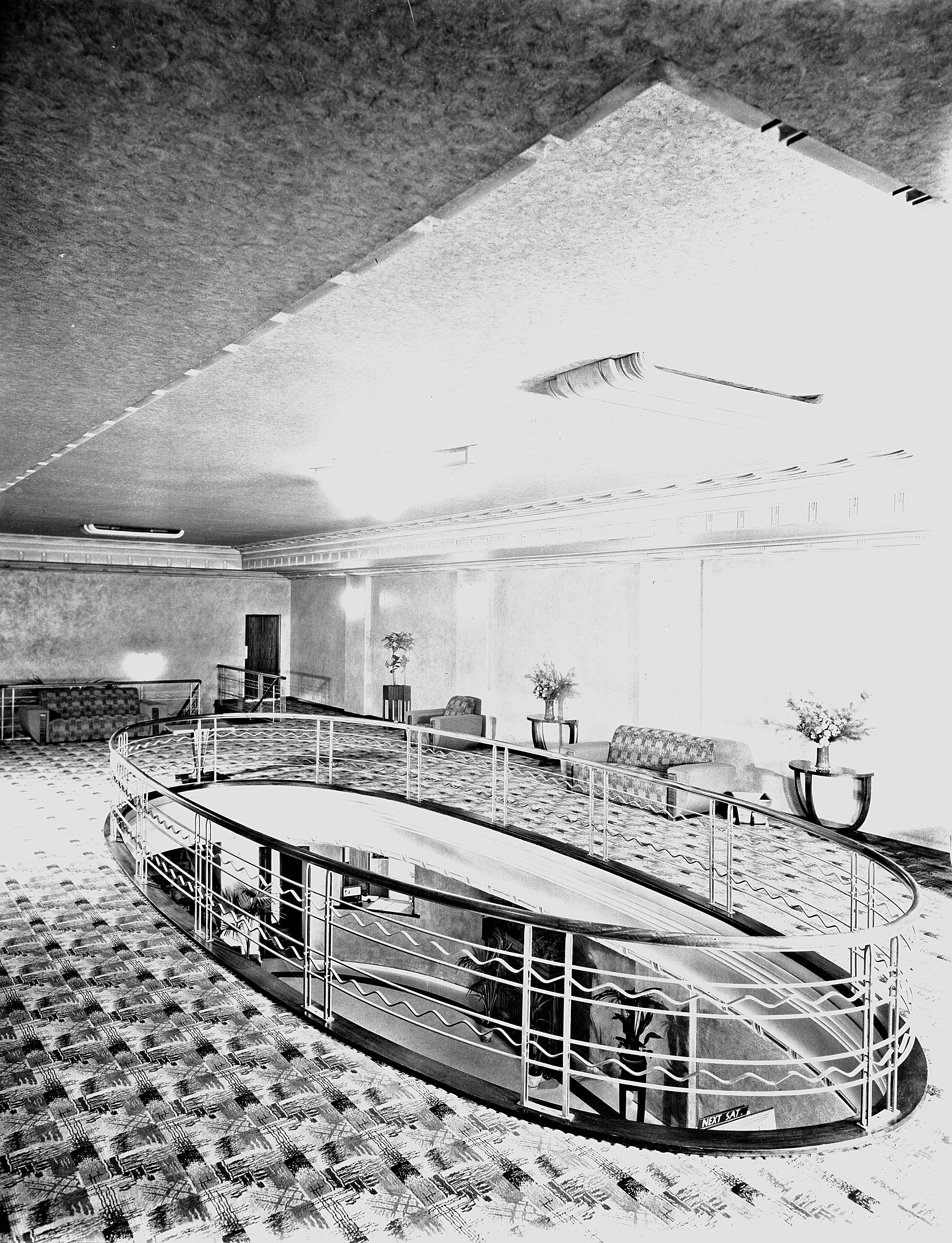
The upstairs foyer.

== Stop Making Sense ==
The Astor has screened the 1984 Talking Heads concert film Stop Making Sense every January since 2016 and will continue to do so for the foreseeable future. The screenings are a Melbourne tradition advertised annually as the "Stop Making Sense Dance Party", with all attendees encouraged to get out of their seats and dance. Many attend in David Byrne's iconic oversized suit and others bring props such as floor lamps.

== In media ==
- The 1992 Australian comedy film Hercules Returns centres on a Melbourne cinema which finds itself in the situation of needing to improvise a soundtrack to 1964's Samson and His Mighty Challenge. The Astor was used for interior shots of that cinema, with the Palais Theatre used for exteriors.
- The 2017 Australian comedy/drama film That's Not Me features a main character, played by Alice Foulcher, who is an aspiring actress that works at a cinema. The Astor was used for shots of that cinema's lobby; however, characters refer to that cinema in-universe as having more than one screen, which the Astor does not.
- The 2017 novella Long Macchiatos and Monsters by Alison Evans centres on two transgender young people who form a connection with each other while attending retro double features at the Astor.
