= Wonderputt =

2011 video game

- App Store icon
- Developer: Damp Gnat
- Publisher: Damp Gnat
- Designer: Reece Millidge
- Programmer: Reece Millidge
- Composer: Daniel Millidge
- Platforms: Browser, iOS
- Release: Browser: WW: 15 August 2011; iOS: WW: 12 September 2012
- Genre: Sports
- Mode: Single-player

Wonderputt is a 2011 golf video game created by Damp Gnat, the studio of independent developer Reece Millidge. Released on Flash and iOS, the game is a simulation of mini golf in which players navigate through a surrealistic animated course that changes its obstacles and holes on a single screen. Millidge developed the game following the creation of earlier mini golf titles, attempting to create a more animated title for a wider audience. Upon release, Wonderputt received positive reviews, with praise directed towards the game's visual presentation and course design and criticism for its controls and short duration. The game was nominated at the Webby Awards and the Independent Games Festival.

== Gameplay ==
Gameplay in Wonderputt features courses that are located on a single screen.

In Wonderputt, the player aims to complete eighteen holes of a mini golf course in as few swings as possible, while avoiding traps and obstacles. They can drag the ball to adjust the strength of the swing in the direction of an arrow. As the player completes holes, the landscape of the course changes, gradually introducing new obstacles and holes to complete. The game features a par score for individual holes and a points system for the final score, encouraging players to replay the game. Completion of the game unlocks a "Rainbow" collectables mode for an additional challenge, in which players aim to complete all holes of the course whilst collecting shards of a rainbow throughout the course for additional points.

== Development and release ==
Wonderputt was created by independent developer Reece Millidge. Millidge had created earlier Flash-based mini golf games Adverputt and Microputt. The game was developed over a six-month period using the Adverputt engine with the purpose of expanding the game for a wider audience and creating a "rich and animated environment". Millidge was inspired by the visual presentation of scientific illustrations and encyclopedias and their cross-section of landscapes and designed parts of the isometric course as an homage to M.C. Escher. Originally intended as a course that played through the diagrams of products advertised on a website, Millidge changed the "direction and flow" of the game as the game's concept exceeded its scope. On 12 September 2012, an iPad compatible version of Wonderputt was released, featuring high definition graphics for a larger display, a longer soundtrack, and a revised control scheme.

== Reception ==
Reception

Aggregate score
Aggregator	Score
Metacritic	77/100

Review scores
Publication	Score
Pocket Gamer	4/5
TouchArcade	4/5
148Apps	4/5
AppSpy	4/5
Slide to Play	Good

Wonderputt received "generally favorable" reviews from critics, according to the review aggregator website Metacritic.

Many critics praised the game's visual presentation and design, with several comparing the design to the work of M.C. Escher. Describing the game as "breathtakingly good-looking", Pocket Gamer highlighted the game's "awe-inspiring" and "brilliant" animations and described the holes as "cleverly interlaced" and "well thought-out". 148Apps described the graphics as "absolutely amazing" and "incredibly detailed". AppSpy praised the "novel artwork", finding the game to be filled with "delightful gadgets and hazards". However, Slide to Play found the miniaturized graphics to limit visibility due to the absence of a zoom system.

Reviewers were mixed on the gameplay and controls. Destructoid commended the game for its "elegant shooting mechanic" and "surprisingly robust physics". Pocket Gamer faulted the iPad controls for being imprecise, stating that precision was limited. Similarly, 148Apps found the isometric graphics to make it "difficult to line up shots" and discerning slopes. AppSpy noted the controls were "not perfect" due to the "tiny areas that are sectioned off to putt on".

Critics were mixed on the game's limited content and replayability. TouchArcade noted the game's single course was a "let down" but found the introduction of collectibles on a second playthrough "much more fun and manageable". Pocket Gamer found that one playthrough of the entire game showcased the game's content in its entirety. 148Apps similarly remarked that "the one course may wear thin over time". AppSpy described the game as a "small offering" that is "easily played through in a single sitting", although acknowledged its additional mode.

=== Sales ===
Millidge recounted that the game was a financial success, with the game receiving 100,000 paid downloads and becoming the #1 paid app on the UK charts.

=== Accolades ===
In 2012, the game received a nomination for Excellence in Visual Art at the Independent Games Festival. In 2014, the game was nominated for a Webby Award for the Best Tablet Game.

== Sequel ==
In December 2022, a sequel titled Wonderputt Forever was announced and released for iOS, Android, and Steam. The mobile version was released exclusively as part of the Netflix Games service. The mobile version was removed from the Netflix Games service on December 9th, 2025.
