= Reece Millidge =

British game designer

- Born: 1975 (age 50–51)
- Other name: Damp Gnat
- Occupations: Animator, game designer
- Website: dampgnat.com

Reece Millidge (born 1975) is a Brighton-based British Flash and mobile game developer, also known under the pseudonym Damp Gnat, which is also the name of his (one-man) studio. He is best known for the games Wonderputt, which was a finalist for the Independent Games Festival Excellence in Visual Art award, and Icycle. Millidge was named a "Breakthrough Brit" at the 2014 BAFTAs.

== Life and career ==
Millidge's father was himself an independent game developer, releasing and self-publishing a single game for the BBC Micro in the 1980s, when Millidge was only 7 years old. Millidge was an early fan of video games, finding himself especially spellbound by the game Exile for the BBC Micro at the age of 13, which also inspired him to make his first own game together with a friend for the Amiga 500. The game was eventually released under the name Odyssey in 1995 by publisher Audiogenic for the Amiga 500/600/1200. A fan letter sent to Peter Irvin, the co-creator of Exile, led to some work at the studio Frontier Developments, where Millidge worked as an artist on the 32X game Darxide (1996).

After Darxide, Millidge worked as an advertising animator and would not return to video game development until 2009, with the release of the Flash game Icycle. That game was followed by Microputt (2010), Adverputt (2010) and the IGF Excellence in Visual Art finalist Wonderputt (2011). His latest release is the game Wonderputt Forever (2022).

In 2016, Millidge joined BAFTA Crew, a program that aims to support career progression by connecting upcoming talent with their peers and established industry figures. He was also a jury member for the BAFTA The Ones To Watch Award in the same year.

== Ludography ==
Date	Title	Platform	Role	Notes	Ref(s)
1995	Odyssey	Amiga 500/600/1200	Artist, composer		
1996	Darxide	32X	Artist		
2009	Icycle	Browser			
2010	Microputt	Browser			
2010	Adverputt	Browser			
2011	Wonderputt	Browser, iOS, Android			
2013	Icycle: On Thin Ice	Browser, iOS, Android, TvOS, PC			
2022	Wonderputt Forever	PC, iOS, Android			
