= Icycle: On Thin Ice =

2013 action-adventure video game

- Developer: Damp Gnat
- Publishers: Chillingo (iOS, tvOS, Android); Damp Gnat (PC, Mac)
- Producer: Chris Spencer
- Designer: Reece Millidge
- Programmer: Reece Millidge
- Artist: Reece Millidge
- Composer: Stilton Studios
- Platforms: Android, iOS, tvOS, Windows, macOS
- Release: November 2013 (iOS) May 19, 2016 (tvOS) May 2017 (Android) October 25, 2017 (Windows, macOS)
- Genre: Action-adventure
- Mode: Single-player

Icycle: On Thin Ice is a 2013 indie action-adventure video game developed by Damp Gnat and published by Chillingo. It is the sequel to the original 2009 browser game Icycle. It was originally released for iOS in November 2013. It then got a release for tvOS on May 19, 2016, Android in May 2017, and for Steam on October 25, 2017.

== Plot ==
The game revolves around Dennis, a naked cyclist, going on a journey to unite with the love of his dreams within a frozen post-apocalyptic world.

== Gameplay ==
Dennis travels through different locations, with the goal to avoid every obstacle on the way as the environment changes. Each level is split into several checkpoints from where the players can continue their attempt. In the iOS version, there are two direction buttons that control the movement, and a button that allows Dennis to perform jumps - holding it for a certain amount of time makes him leap higher.

Unlike the first game, the players can use an umbrella to slow down the fall. Ice cubes collected in various places can be spent in the shop for clothes, accessories, vacuums to suck in ice cubes, umbrellas. vehicles, and more. Completing missions for each location can give you ice cubes as a reward and spend on them to simplify a mission. All 80 missions completed unlocks the option to play the original Icycle game.

== Development ==
Similar to its predecessor, Icycle: On Thin Ice was inspired by the BBC Micro game Daredevil Dennis with the opening section of the level "Window Shopping 2" serving as a direct homage. Several levels intended to take place inside Dennis's dreams allowed Millidge to experiment with environments away from the icy setting, taking inspiration from the works of René Magritte and Charley Harper.

In 2020, Icycle: On Thin Ice was delisted from iOS, tvOS, and Android devices due to Electronic Arts ceasing Chillingo’s publishing operations. While a possible return was teased, as of 2026, the game is currently only available on PC and Mac via Steam. When asked about a possible console release, Millidge expressed interest but stated that the game’s engine had issues that prevented it.

== Reception ==
Icycle: On Thin Ice received "generally favorable" for the iOS version, according to review aggregator website Metacritic.

=== Awards ===
List
Year	Award ceremony	Category	Result	Ref
2013	E3's Into The Pixel	Artwork	Winner	
2014	Tabby	Best Action-Adventure	Finalist	
2014	Develop	Indie Showcase	Finalist	
