= Westgarth Theatre =

Historic cinema in Northcote, Victoria

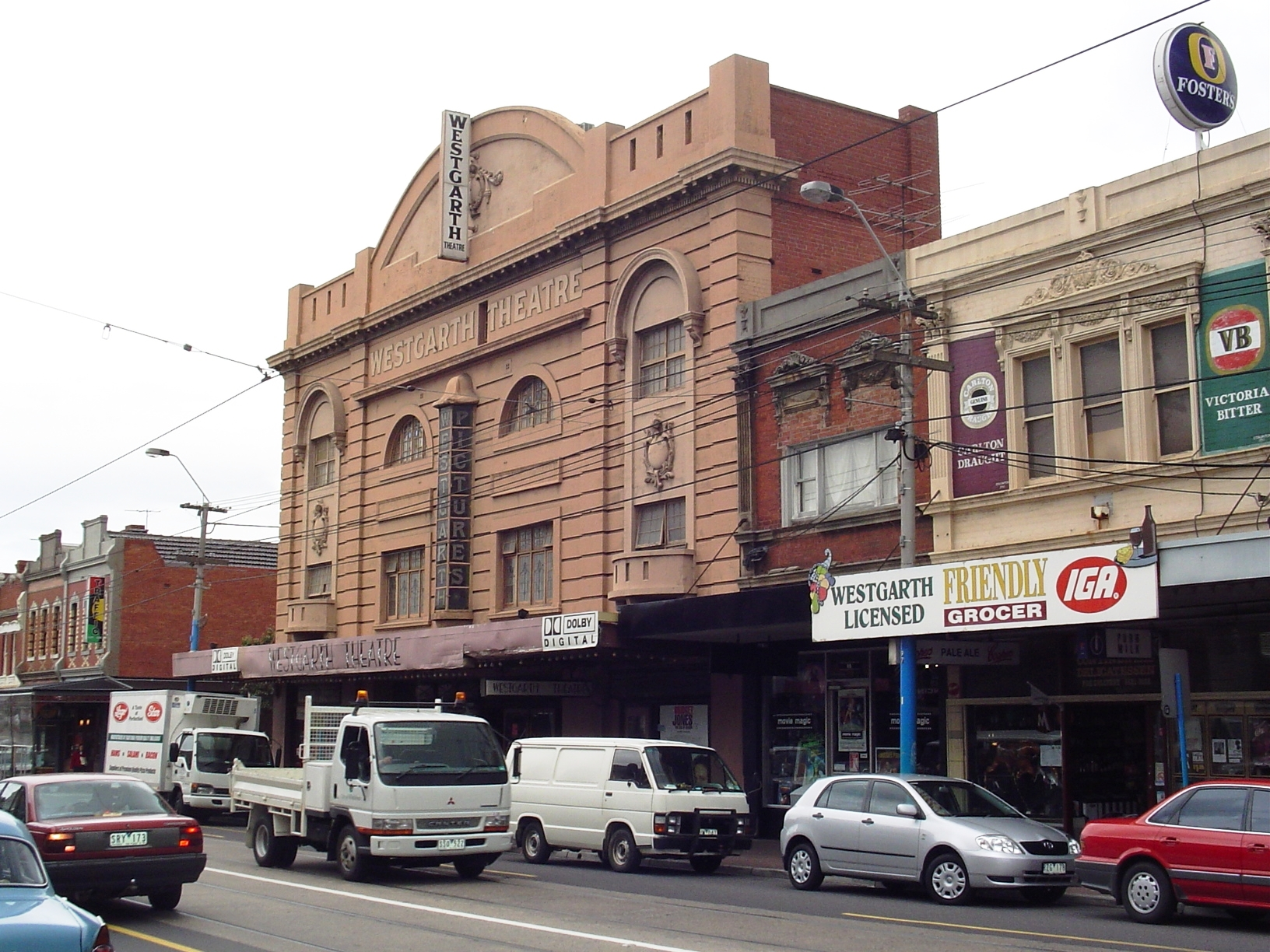
- The building as it appeared in 2004
- Interactive map of the Westgarth Theatre area
- Former names: The Valhalla (1987–1996)
- Alternative names: Palace Westgarth, Westgarth Cinema

General information
- Architectural style: Free Classical
- Location: 89 High Street, Westgarth, Northcote (Melbourne), Victoria, Australia
- Coordinates: 37.779751397088305°S 144.99680674545345°E ,
- Current tenants: Palace Cinemas
- Completed: 20 October 1921
- Owner: Peter Yiannoudes

Design and construction
- Main contractor: John Seccull

The Westgarth Theatre, formerly the Valhalla Cinema and now operating as the Palace Westgarth, is a heritage-listed movie theatre in the Westgarth neighbourhood of Northcote in Melbourne, Australia.

== History ==
The Westgarth arose from an era in which High Street featured many theatres in Thornbury and Northcote, including the Thornbury Picture Palace, Lyric Theatre and Northcote Town Hall. Design of the building is sometimes credited to Walter Burley Griffin, but this claim is unsubstantiated. No architect was credited during construction. It opened on 20 October 1921, with the opening night featuring a double bill of The Mother Heart and Anne of Green Gables.

Attendance faced a downturn with the introduction of television in the 1950s. In 1966, the building was acquired by Peter Yiannoudes and his company Cosmopolitan Motion Pictures Pty Ltd. It then became one of a chain of Cosmopolitan-owned cinemas that catered to Melbourne's Greek community, exclusively playing imported films that were either Greek in origin or featured Greek language subtitles. Without Yiannoudes' intervention and the Greek community's support for cinema during this period, it is unlikely that the Westgarth would have survived.

A stage was added in the 1980s to allow for live performances, necessitating the removal of 15 seats. As with cinema in general, attendance declined in the 1980s due to the rise of home video.

In 1987, the Westgarth changed its name to The Valhalla after the cinema of the same name, formerly based in Richmond, moved their operations there. On opening night, the first half of The Blues Brothers was screened as a midnight movie in Richmond then all patrons were asked to go to Westgarth for the rest of it, causing a local traffic jam at 1 am. Programming in this era consisted of cult film and arthouse screenings, including 24-hour sci-fi marathons.

The Valhalla's lease ended in 1996 and management reverted to Yiannoudes, who changed the name back to Westgarth Theatre. In 2006, the building was leased by Palace Cinemas who also acquired the cinema's business and added two extra screens in the former upstairs balcony. Yiannoudes retains ownership of the building itself. He maintains an office on the premises full of memorabilia from decades of Greek cinema that he plans to turn into a museum.

The Westgarth was heritage listed by the National Trust of Australia in 1994 and the City of Darebin in 2000.

In 2017, the Westgarth began showing films outdoors in the building's backyard, dubbing the newly used space the "Capi Outdoor Cinema."

In 2022, the theatre celebrated 101 years of opening with a special "Westgarth 101" series of films from throughout the decades of its operation.

== In media ==
- The interior shots for the music video for INXS' "Listen Like Thieves" were filmed at the Westgarth in 1986, while the Palais Theatre in St Kilda was used for the exterior shots. The theatre is depicted as a post-apocalyptic wasteland. The music video was directed by Richard Lowenstein.
