= John Clarke (comedian) =

English comedian

- Died: 20 February 1879; London
- Occupation: Comedian

John Clarke (died 20 February 1879) was an English comedian.

== Biography ==
Clarke is first heard of in London as a photographer in Farringdon Street. He quit to become general utility actor in various country theatres. A brief appearance at the Strand Theatre under Allcroft's management as Master Toby in ‘Civilisation,’ a play by Wilkins, was followed by a representation, 7 October 1852, at Drury Lane of Fathom in the ‘Hunchback.’ A speculative season, to which he owed this engagement, soon came to an end, and Clarke returned to the country. He reappeared at the Strand as principal comedian, September 1853. His first distinct success was won in burlesque, a line in which his reputation dated from his performance, September 1856, of Ikey the Jew in Leicester Buckingham's travesty of ‘Belphegor.’ At Christmas 1857 Clarke was engaged for the pantomime at Drury Lane, then under the management of E. T. Smith. He returned, 1858, to the Strand, which had passed into the hands of Miss Swanborough, and played with success in a series of well-remembered burlesques by F. Talfourd, H. J. Byron, and other authors. His chief triumphs were in the ‘Bonnie Fishwife,’ as Isaac of York, and as Varney. Clarke then played with Webster at the Adelphi, at the Olympic, where his Quilp obtained much approval, at the Globe, and in pantomime at Covent Garden. On 15 April 1865 he took part in the performance of the company headed by Miss Marie Wilton (now Mrs. Bancroft), with which the little theatre in Tottenham Street, Tottenham Court Road, reopened as the Prince of Wales's, and played Amina in Byron's burlesque of ‘La Sonnambula.’ His last appearance was at the Criterion, where he appeared in some new pieces, and in the ‘Porter's Knot.’

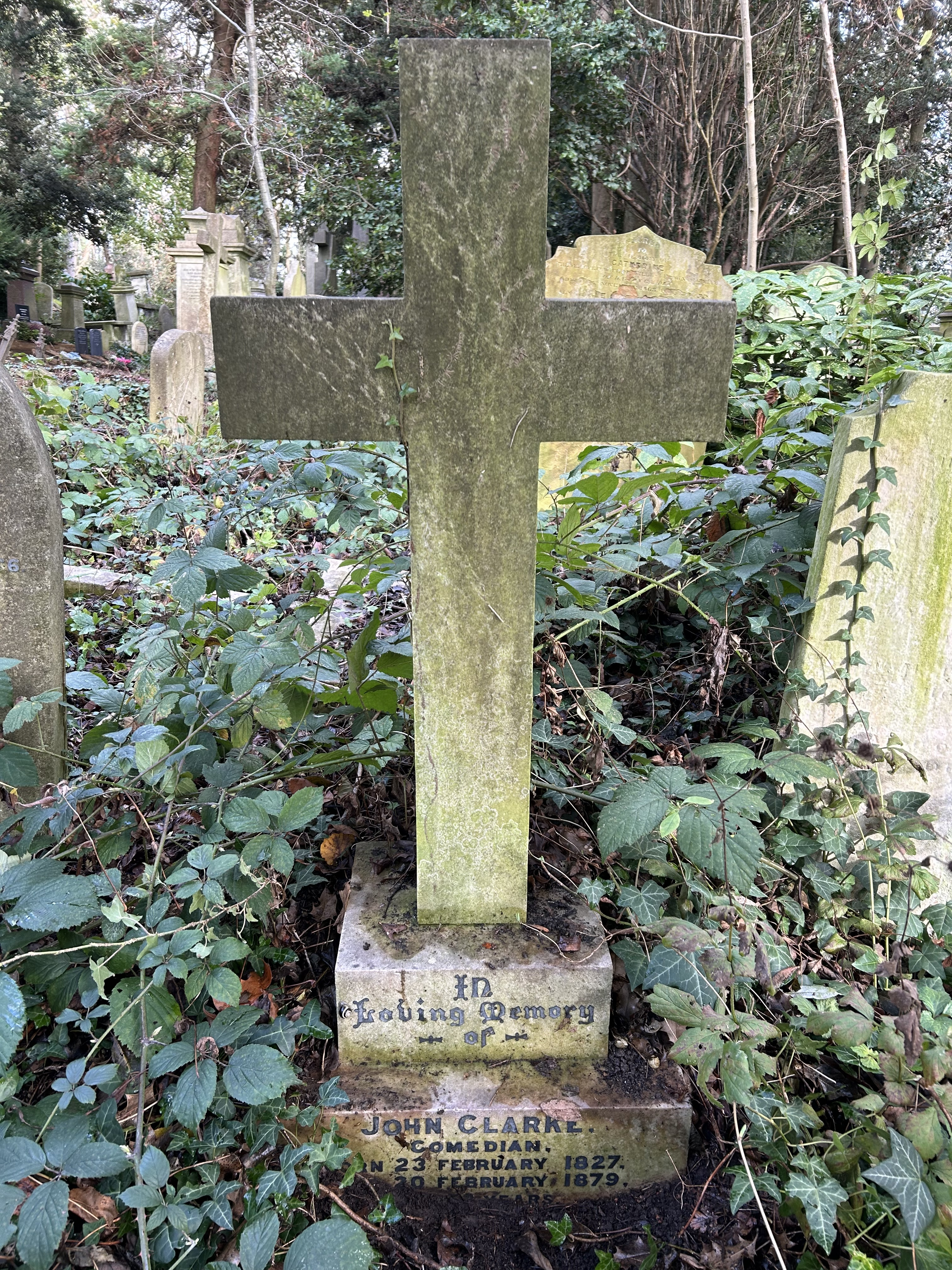
Grave of John Clarke and Teresa Furtado in Highgate Cemetery

In 1873, he married Miss Teresa Furtado, a well-known actress, who died 9 August 1877. After her death he broke down. He died 20 February 1879, aged about fifty, in Torriano Avenue, London, N.W. He was buried with Teresa on the western side of Highgate Cemetery. He was a competent actor, with a grating voice and a hard style. His burlesque dancing was marred by an accident to his leg experienced while riding on horseback.
