= Icycle (video game) =

2009 platformer video game

- Developer: Damp Gnat
- Publisher: Damp Gnat
- Designer: Reece Millidge
- Programmer: Reece Millidge
- Artist: Reece Millidge
- Composers: Stilton Studios; Studio 42
- Platform: Web browser
- Release: 5 December 2009
- Genre: Platformer
- Mode: Single-player

Icycle is a 2009 indie platformer video game developed by Damp Gnat, the studio of independent developer Reece Millidge. Released in Flash, the game has players ride a bicycle through a frozen world as a man named Dennis, who has just been cryogenically unfrozen.

== Plot ==
A man named Dennis is the lone survivor in a frozen, post-apocalyptic world. After being cryogenically unfrozen beside a pod containing a bicycle, he sees another unseen figure dash away and decides to follow.

== Gameplay ==
Dennis travels through a frozen world, with the goal to avoid every obstacle on the way as the environment changes. Unique among many platformers, Dennis is unable to move backwards. Frozen soap bubbles appear as collectables in every level, with the total amount collected tallied at the end of the game. Upon completing all levels, Dennis gains a bonus article of clothing, with several more unlocking with each replay.

== Development and release ==
Icycle was inspired by the BBC Micro game Daredevil Dennis and started development around 2006–2007. The icy setting was created due to Flash’s limitations, as full vector animation wasn’t possible in a web browser at the time. The frozen imagery helped explain the static, nonmoving backgrounds and environments.

While initially considering a dog as the main character, Millidge believed something more vulnerable and empathetic would work better, leading him to create Dennis, a balding middle-aged naked man. Dennis is voiced by Pete Hosking.

Icycle was released on dampgnat.com and Newgrounds on 5 December 2009. Over the coming years, several flash sites hosted the game, encouraged by Millidge with a free download link on his site.

== Sequel ==
A sequel titled Icycle: On Thin Ice was released for iOS devices in 2013 with later versions for tvOS, Android, PC, and Mac.
