= Palace Cinemas (Australia) =

Australian cinema chain

- Type: Private
- Industry: Movie theaters
- Predecessor: Pix Theatre
- Founded: 1965
- Founder: Antonio Zeccola
- Headquarters: Melbourne, Victoria, Australia
- Number of locations: See § Locations
- Area served: Australia
- Key people: Benjamin Zeccola (CEO)
- Revenue: ▲$1.23B (2000)
- Owner: Palace Co. Pty Ltd.
- Members: 2350 (1989)
- Parent: Palace Co. Pty Ltd.
- Website: www.palacecinemas.com.au

Palace Cinemas is an Australian cinema chain that specialises in arthouse and international films.

Their head office are based in the Melbourne suburb of South Yarra and they operate locations in New South Wales (Central Park, Norton Street, Byron Bay, Ballina& Oxford St), Victoria (Coburg, Ballarat, Brighton Bay, Northcote, Balwyn, Brighton, South Yarra, Melbourne, Moonee Ponds & The Astor Theatre), Western Australia (Raine Square), Queensland (Brisbane & Fortitude Valley) & Canberra.

== Operations ==
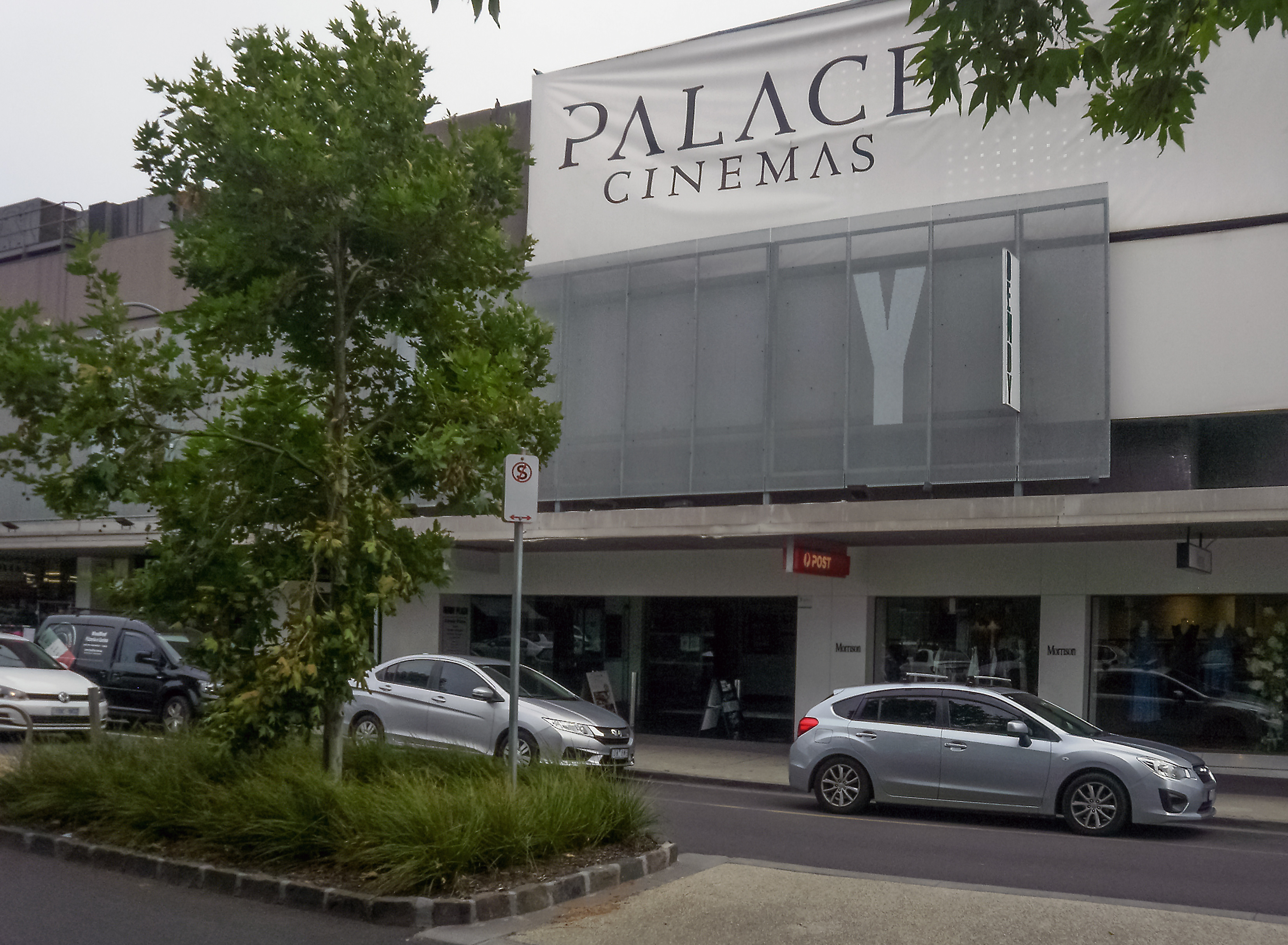
Palace Cinemas at Brighton, Victoria

Palace Cinema operate a variety of locations that specialise in international and local art-house films and cinema events. Palace has been managed by the Zeccola family since its inception.

Palace Moore Park has a non-competition deal with its neighbouring cinema Hoyts to not screen mainstream titles.

While Palace only owns one cinema in Western Australia, it also operates several others in partnership with Luna Cinemas. The Luna Palace Cinemas line have their own independent website, membership program and offers. Palace Cinema's regular nationwide membership and offers in other states, are therefore not valid at these cinemas. Luna Palace uniquely operates two seasonal outdoor cinemas, one in Leederville (opposite their traditional cinema) and one in Mosman Park.

=== Film festivals ===
Palace also operate a series of international film festivals, highlighting a range of films from a chosen country. Festivals include the Alliance Française French Film Festival, the Lavazza Italian Film Festival, the Spanish Film Festival, German Film Festival, the Scandinavian Film Festival, Japanese Film Festival, and the British Film Festival.

== History ==
Palace Cinemas was founded by Antonio Zeccola in 1965. Zeccola's first cinema, Pix Theatre in Noble Park, was originally only open on weekends and operated as a dance theatre for the rest of the week.

In late 1994, Palace opened The Como and The George cinemas in Melbourne. The George originally focused on "new Australian films as well as experimental fare and cinema of a more quirky nature, whether sexual, social or political", while The Como highlighted "films selected from the Cannes, Venice, Toronto and Berlin festivals".

In 1995, Palace acquired the Academy Twin cinema on Oxford Street in Sydney and opened the four screen Verona complex. Nicole Kidman officially opened the Verona site on Valentine's Day in 1996.

In 2000, Palace Norton Street held Australia's first professionally organised Italian film festival.

In 2005, Cinema Como received a $1 million renovation. Antonio Zeccola announced that Brighton Bay, The George and Palace's Sydney locations would receive similar refurbishment. In December, Palace announced they would take over and reopen Sydney's Chauvel cinema.

In 2016, Palace moved their head office to South Yarra.

In 2017, Palace Cinemas opened Palace Central. The venue features 10 standard cinemas and three Palace Platinum cinemas. Two of the cinemas feature floor to ceiling windows that curtains obscure when a screening begins.

The Pentridge Cinema opened in 2020 in the shopping centre located inside the old HM Prison Pentridge in the northern Melbourne suburb of Coburg. It was the first Palace Cinema to open with a Dolby Atmos dedicated auditorium.

In November 2023, Palace announced that it would be permanently closing Palace Verona in February 2024. The site would be replaced with a new location at The Entertainment Quarter in Moore Park.

In December 2023, Palace's Moonee Ponds location Penny Lane opened to the public. The cinema has 11 indoor screens and a rooftop cinema.

Palace Verona closed on 25 February 2024. The Chauvel Cinema in Paddington closed in January 2026.

== Locations ==
=== Adelaide ===
- Palace Nova Eastend – 12 screens (Cinema Place), host of the Adelaide Film Festival from 2020
- Palace Nova Prospect – 14 screens (Prospect Road)

=== Brisbane ===
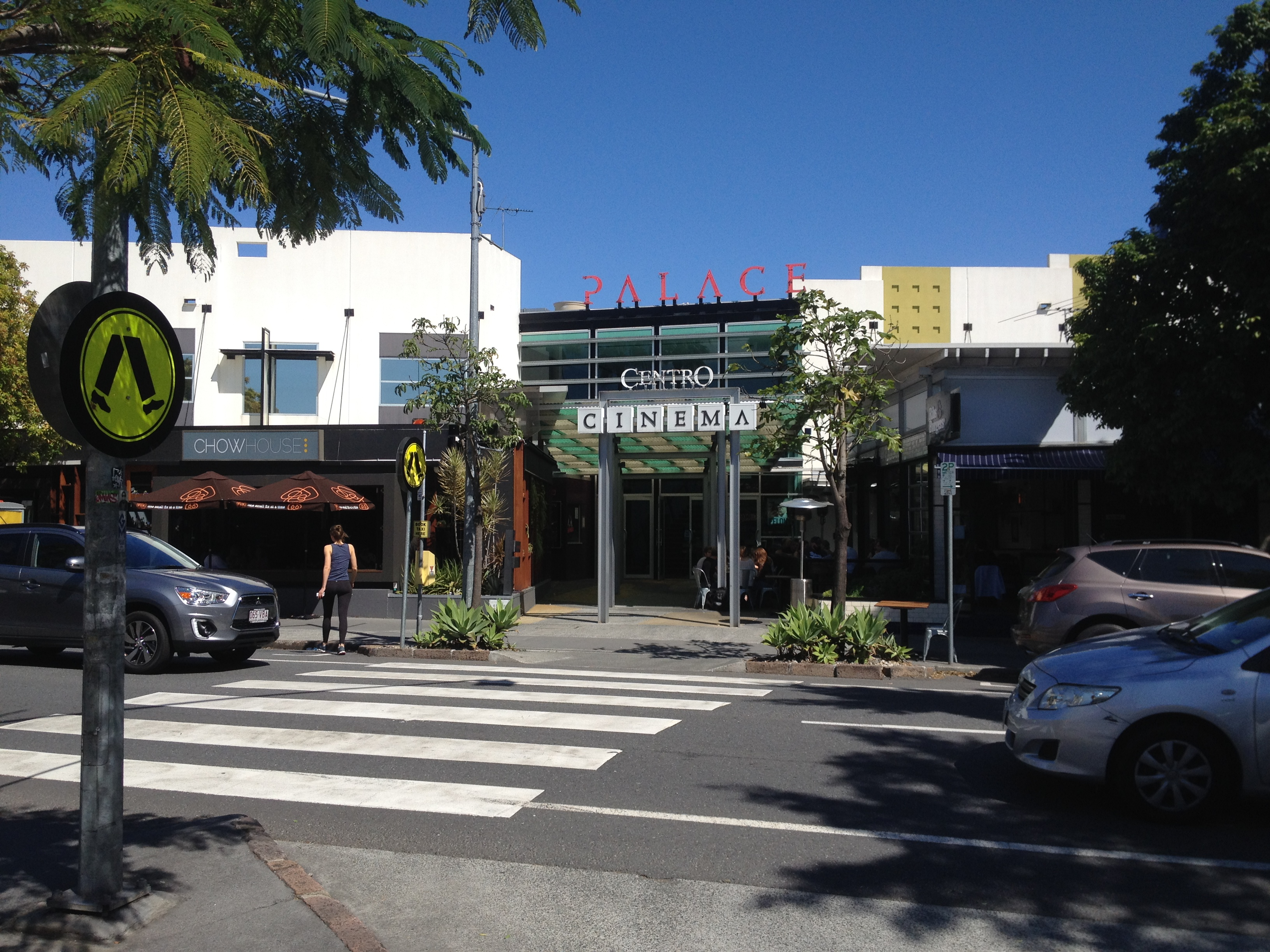
Centro, Fortitude Valley, Brisbane

- Barracks
- James Street (formerly Centro)

=== Byron Bay ===
- Byron Bay
- Ballina Fair

=== Canberra ===
- Palace Electric

=== Melbourne ===
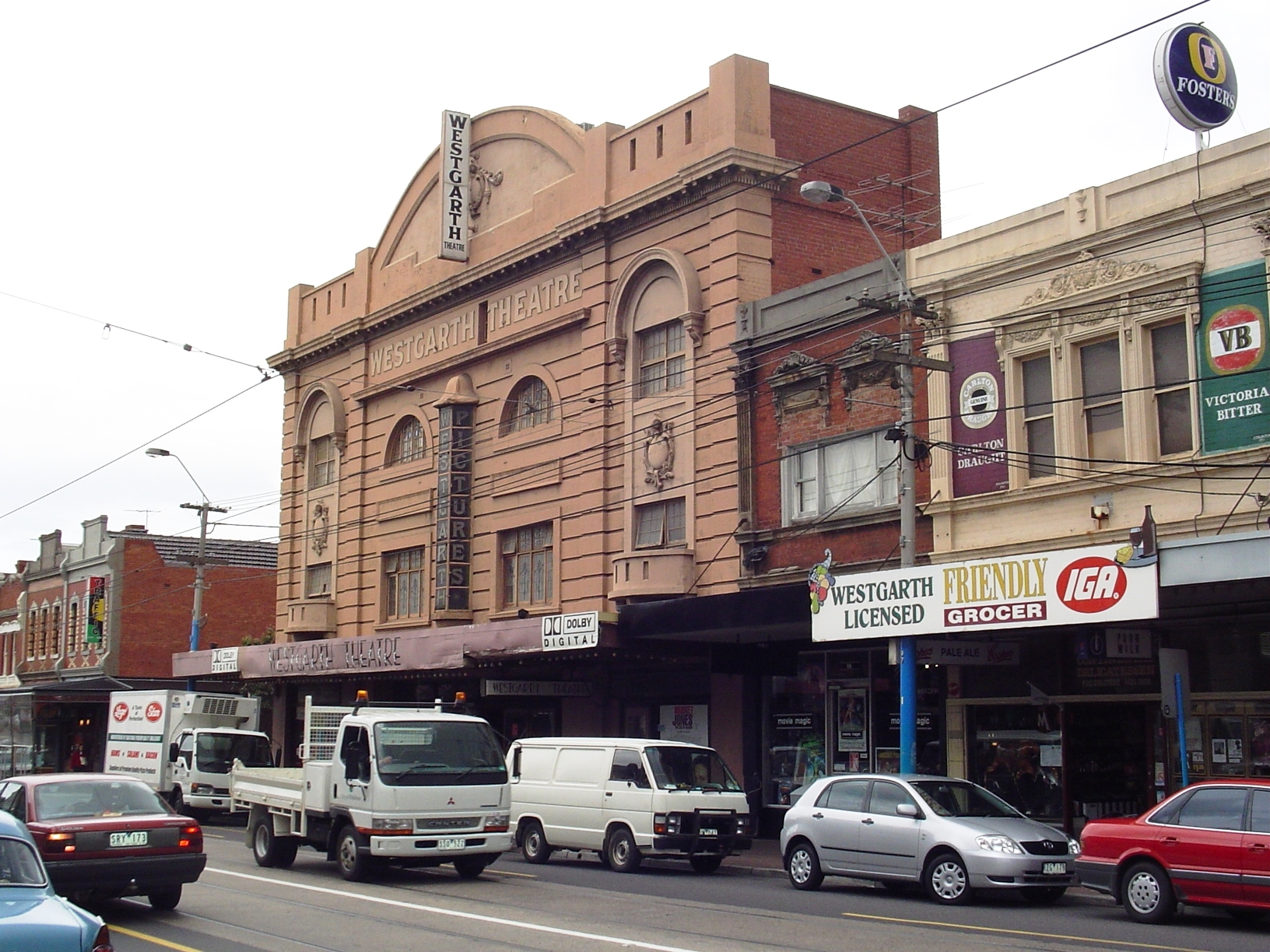
Palace Westgarth, Melbourne

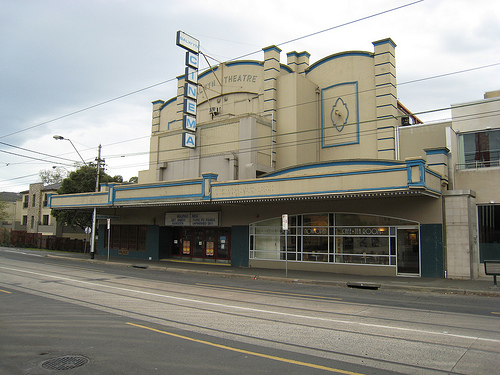
Palace Cinemas in Balwyn, Melbourne

- The Astor Theatre (mostly classic films)
- Balwyn
- Brighton Bay
- Dendy Brighton
- Pentridge Cinema – opened 2020, located in the shopping centre in old Pentridge Prison, first Palace cinema with Dolby Atmos auditorium
- Cinema Como
- The Kino (partnership)
- Westgarth Theatre
- Penny Lane

=== Perth ===
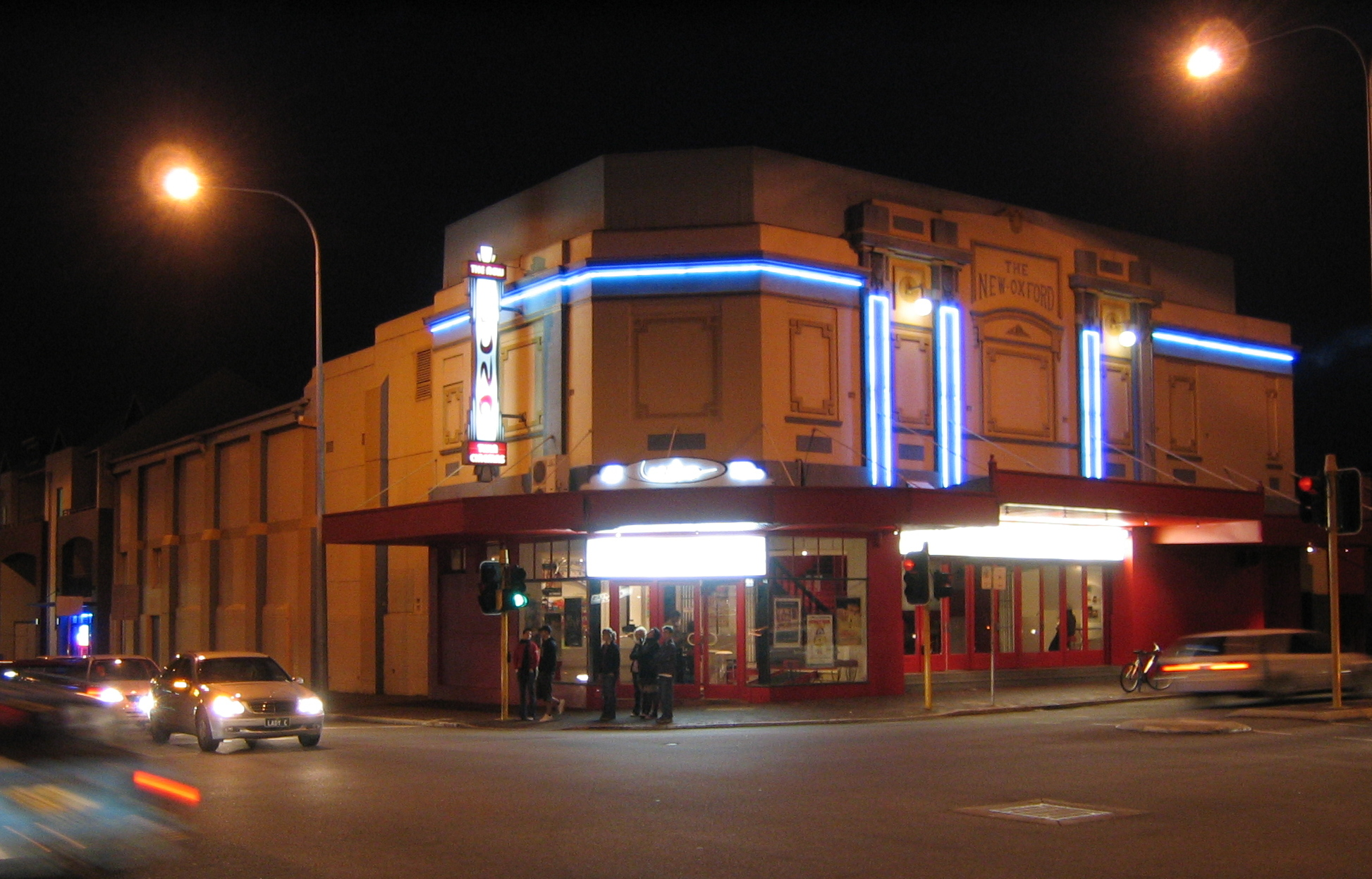
Luna Leederville, Perth

- Raine Square
- Cinemas in partnership with Luna Cinemas
  - Luna Leederville
  - Luna on SX, Fremantle
  - Windsor Cinema, Nedlands
  - Luna Outdoor, Leederville
  - Camelot Outdoor, Mosman Park

=== Sydney ===
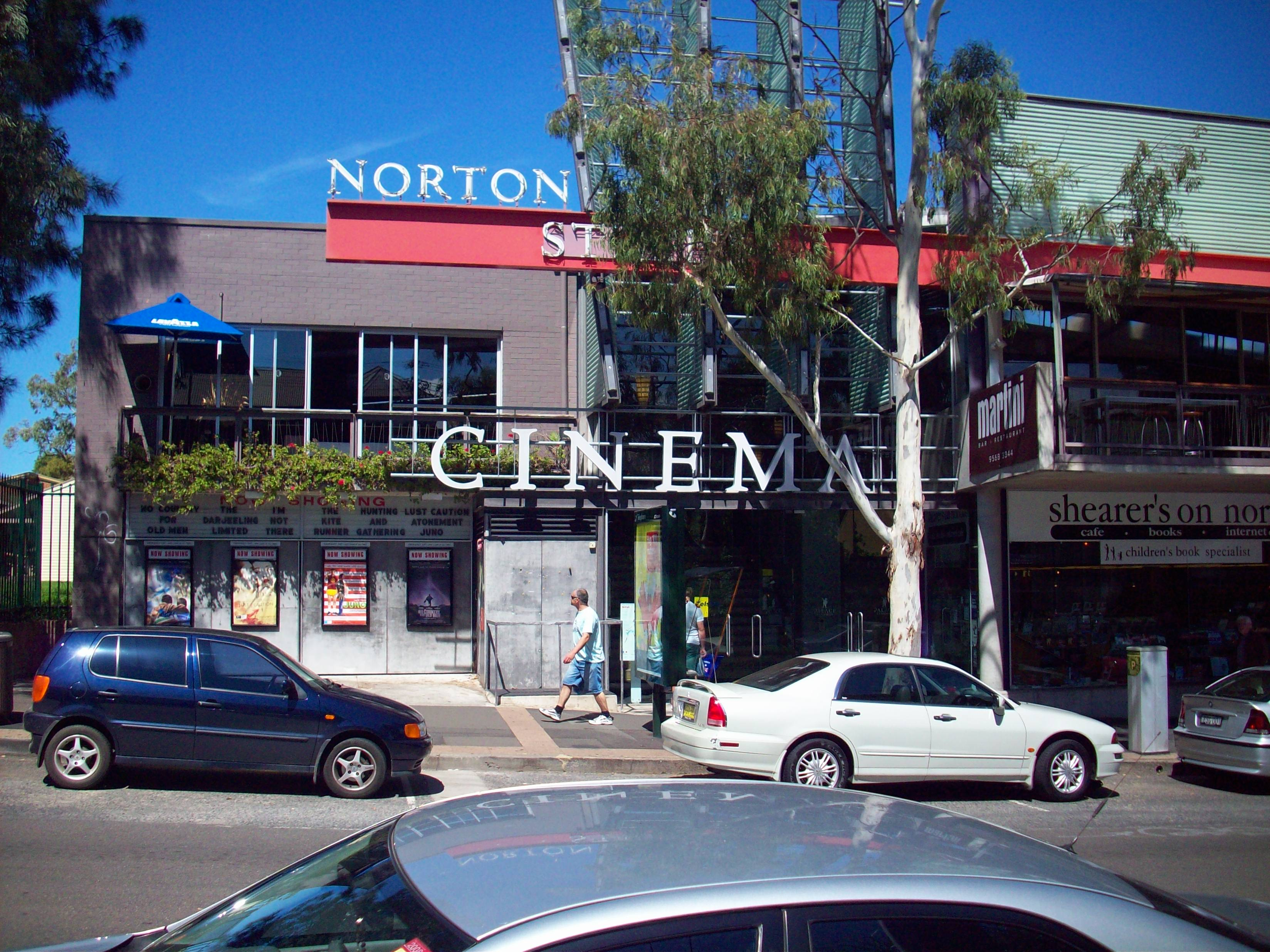
Palace Norton Street, Leichhardt, Sydney

- Central
- Norton Street
- Moore Park

=== Closed cinemas ===
==== Adelaide ====
- Nova Eastend (Rundle Street)

==== Perth ====
- Palace Northbridge

==== Sydney ====
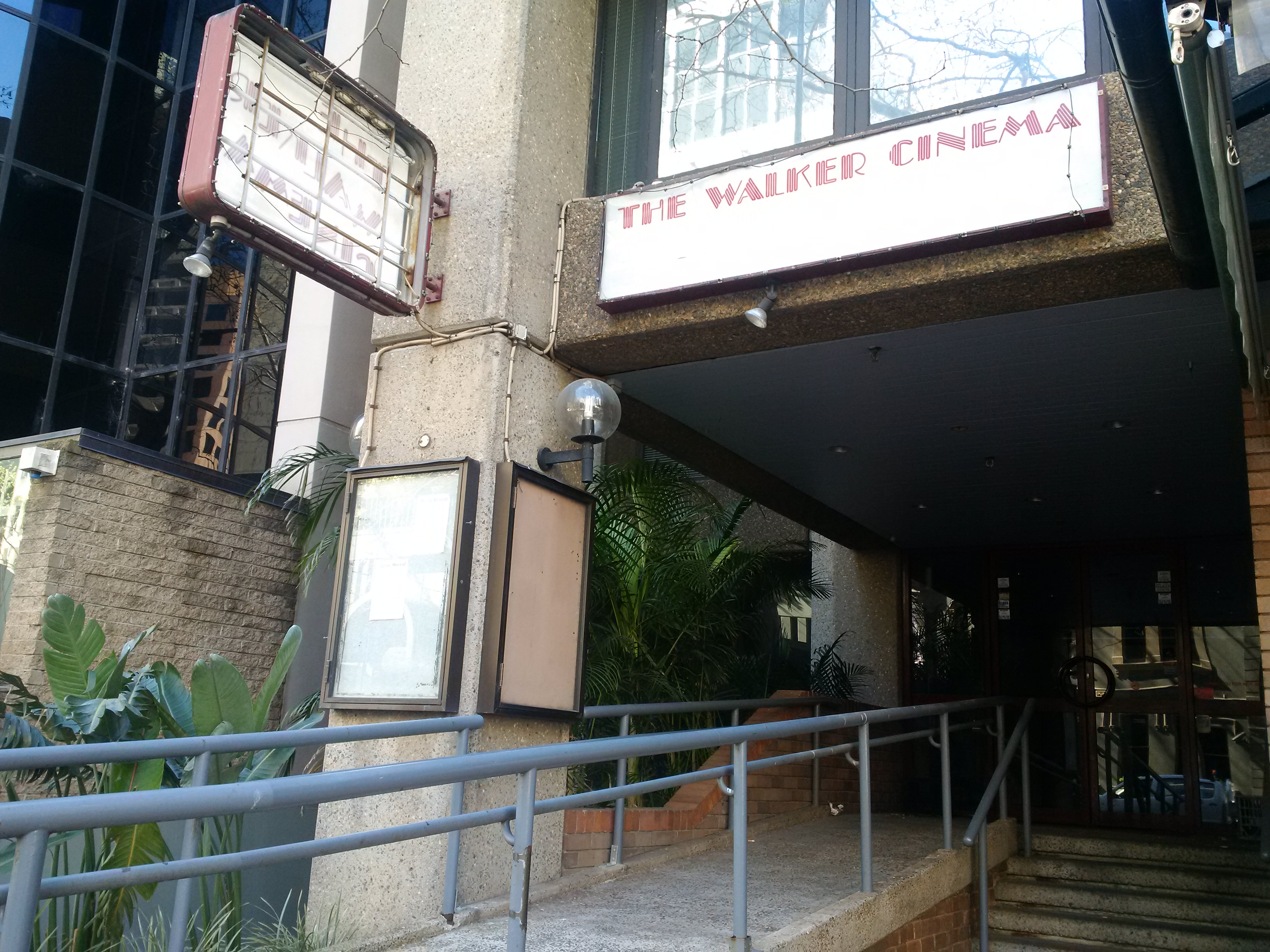
The old Walker Street cinemas in North Sydney

- Academy Twin, Paddington
- The Walker Cinema, North Sydney
- Verona
- The Chauvel Cinema

== Palace Films ==
Palace has produced and distributed such Australian films as Kokoda and Chopper, and distribute many foreign language films in Australia.

== See also ==
- List of film production companies
- List of television production companies
