= Wimmins Circus =

Former Australian feminist circus troupe (1979–1981)

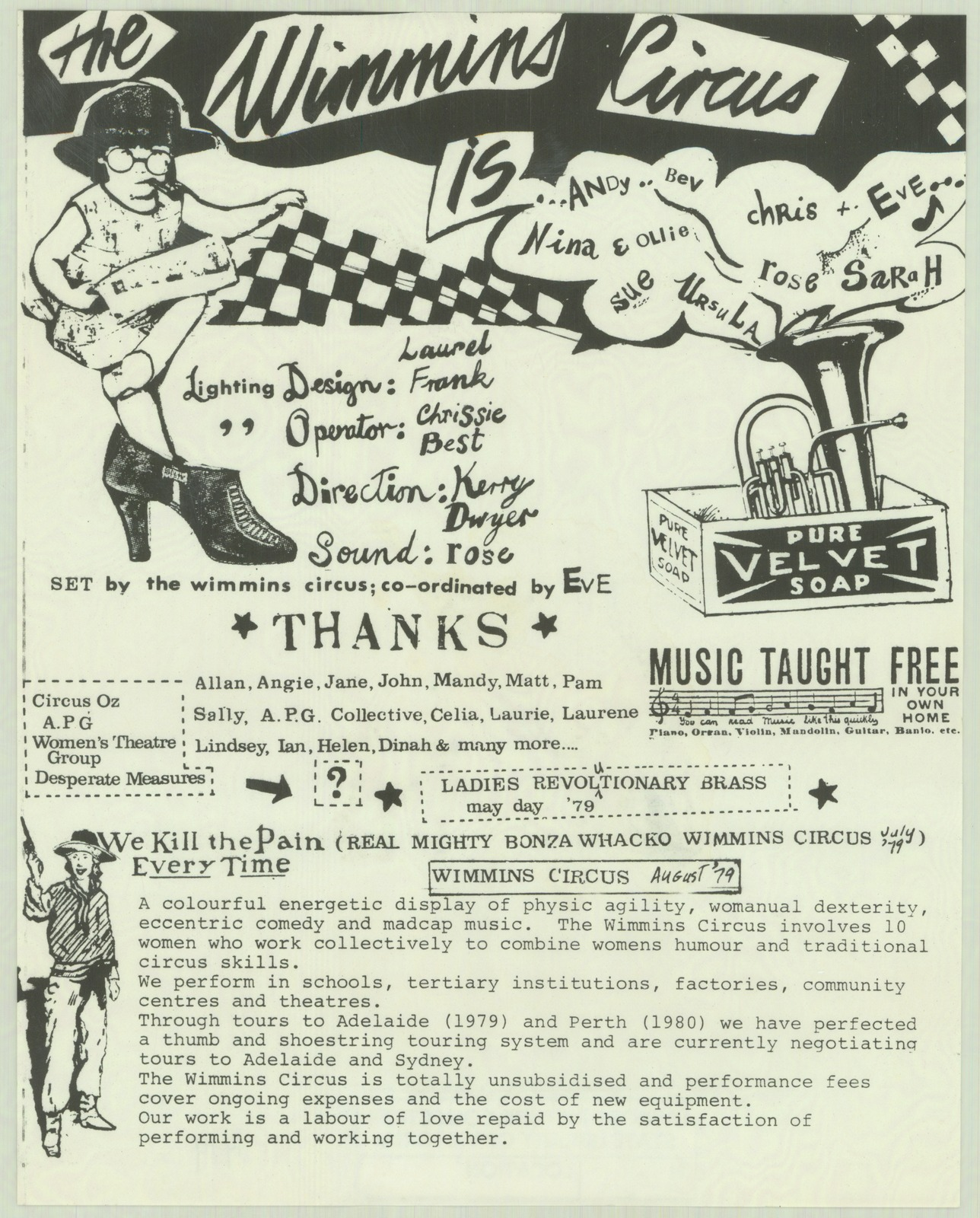
Wimmins Circus poster, c. 1979 (State Library Victoria)

The Wimmins Circus was an Australian feminist circus social circus troupe, based in Melbourne, Victoria. It was founded in 1979 by Ollie Black, Sarah McNamara, Rose Wise, and Christine Evans, and said to be the first women's circus in the world. Its home base was the Pram Factory, but it also toured to Sydney, Adelaide, Perth, and elsewhere in Australia before it disbanded in 1981.

== Background and history ==
In 1972, women from the Australian Performing Group (APG) devised and performed Betty Can Jump at the Pram Factory, Melbourne, which had a significant impact on the development of feminist theatre and thought through the 1970s. The performance was created partly as a reaction to working in the male-dominated APG, and had a very positive response. It inspired many performers, writers, directors and others around the country, such as the Adelaide Women's Theatre Group and the Fool's Gallery in Canberra, as well as the acrobatic group Circus Oz. Betty Can Jump was devised and performed by Helen Garner, her friend Kerry Dwyer, and four women from the Carlton Women's Liberation Group and APG: Claire Dobbin, Evelyn Krape, Yvonne Marini, and Jude Kuring.

Circus Oz was based at the Pram Factory, located in the Melbourne suburb of Carlton. Women in this group included Robin Laurie, Sue Broadway, Jane Mullett, Celeste Howden, Laurel Frank, and Hellen Sky. Robin Laurie and Ursula Harrison were members of the APG, and along with Jane Mullett were also instrumental in the formation of the Melbourne Women's Theatre Group, which formed in 1974 and disbanded in 1977.

Ollie Black was living in Fremantle, Western Australia, around 1977, when she, along with Micko O'Byrne and Duncan Campbell, formed the political and feminist community theatre group Desperate Measures, which was in existence until 1981. Sarah McNamara joined the group. McNamara and Black moved to Melbourne and, along with Rose Wise and Christine Evans, were co-founders of the Wimmins Circus in 1979. Black and others first formed a one-off group called the Mighty Bonza Whacko Women's Circus, which included some of the Circus Oz performers and proved to be a huge success, with feminism in Australia at a peak at the time. Mighty Bonza Whacko Women's Circus gave their debut performance at "Art Attacks", which were held at Swinburne College of Technology, in July 1979. A poster advertising a performance by "The Real Mighty Bonza Whacko Wimmin's Circus" on 18 October 1979 at St Mathews Hall, Prahran College, was designed by Eve Glenn.

Wimmins Circus performed under this name in August 1979. Robin Laurie, Jane Mullett, Ursula Harrison, and Hellen Sky helped establish the group out of Circus Oz, and Sky stayed on with the group after leaving Circus Oz.

Kerry Dwyer, who had been a founding member of APG as well as La Mama Theatre in Melbourne, became a circus performer, later directing the Wimmins Circus. She also toured with Circus Oz in 1981, and appeared in the films On Guard (1984) and Molly.

Wimmins Circus finally disbanded in Sydney in 1981, after a sold-out season of their final show at the Pram Factory, directed by Kerry Dwyer.

== Description ==
Wimmins Circus was a social circus. Their acts were described as "a zany combination of traditional circus skills, eccentric comedy and madcap music". Co-founder Ollie Black later wrote that the group used "humour and live music to present images of women that challenged stereotypes", and:

The original Wimmins Circus was a group of witty and wonderful women who basically wanted to have a fun time presenting physically inspiring feminist theatre. The versatile acrobatic tumblings and powerful balance routines with all the members including myself created stunning visual puns on standard images of women. We all did everything. Absolutely everything, as well as juggling child care, law degrees, secretarial work, artistic careers and lovers...

They toured to Sydney, Adelaide, Perth, and other places in Australia, performing in schools, universities and colleges, factories, community centres, theatres, and outdoor venues. They gave a performance for striking "wharfies" at the Williamstown waterfront in Melbourne. The group was funded completely by sales, with no subsidies provided by government or corporate sponsors.

== Members ==
Wimmins Circus comprised women of various ages, skill levels, and performance backgrounds. The core 10 members were:

- Ollie Black
- Nina (Bondarenko) (Note: Surnames (and two other names not listed here) have been provided by private email by former members of Wimmins Circus.)
- Sue Bradley
- Christine Evans
- Bev (Fischer)
- Eve Glenn
- Ursula Harrison
- Sarah McNamara
- Andy Pearce
- Rose Wise

A poster advertising Wimmins Circus in August 1979 shows Dwyer as director, and performers as Andy, Bev, Nina, Ollie, Chris, Eve, Sue, Ursula, Rose, and Sarah. Set design was coordinated by Eve, while Rose was responsible for sound. APG member Laurel Frank did the lighting. Hellen Sky was also a member of the group, at least initially.

Christine Evans learnt to play the mandolin in order to play with the circus band. Glenn played electric guitar.

== Selected performances ==
On Sunday 14 October 1979, Wimmin's Circus appeared, along with the bands Redgum, Small Axe, and Hit 'n' Run, at an Anti-Uranium Benefit concert, in support of trade union bans on uranium mining, at the Caulfield Institute of Technology at Caulfield, Melbourne.

Wimmins Circus performed for a season Perth in summer 1980.

The troupe performed at the second Women and Labour Conference at the University of Melbourne, which took place from 17 to 19 May 1980. A reviewer wrote in the ANU student newspaper Woroni "The highlight of the night was the 'Wimmins Circus', who performed various acts of skill and dare-devillry(sic) for the delight and amazement of the audience".

On 5 June 1980, the Wimmin's Circus began their first season at the Pram Factory in Melbourne, performing twice a day. A poster designed by Eve Glenn advertising the season, which ran until 15 June, is held in the Powerhouse Museum in Sydney. Above a photograph of a human pyramid of 10 performers overlaid with carton drawing are the words "Was it a dream or did they shoot thru the sky on beams of pure energy?".

In July 1980, the Wimmin's Circus performed at the second "Rock Against Racism" concert at the Northcote Town Hall in Northcote, Melbourne, along with bands including No Fixed Address, Men at Work, and Ross Hannaford's Lucky Dog.

On Thursday 7 August 1980, the troupe gave a free performance at the Roundhouse at the University of New South Wales in Sydney, organised by the student's union. On Saturday 9 August they appeared at Glebe Town Hall, Glebe, in Sydney, along with the bands Stray Dags and Hens' Teeth. Also in Sydney, they performed at Shopfront Theatre on 7 August, and the Women's Warehouse (also spelt Wimmins Warehouse) (Note: "The Wimmins Warehouse... was run as a women's collective from 1979 to 1981 in a five-storey warehouse in Sydney's Haymarket area. An unofficial headquarters for the social and cultural activity of the Women’s Liberation Movement,..." "The Women’s Warehouse was an unproclaimed, yet undeniably, lesbian feminist space.") on 10 August.

== Legacy ==
Wimmins Circus was the first exclusively women's circus troupe in the world.

After the demise of the troupe in 1981, a group of former members of the troupe, including Ollie Black, moved to Sydney and established Lollie's Warehouse. Many women's performance groups performed there in the early 1980s, including Harpies Bizarre, Freeda Stairs, the Piano Accordion Band, and Furious Chicken.

Furious Chicken was formed in Sydney by Christine Evans, Celia White, and Andy Pearce, with their debut performance at the 1982 Sydney Women and Arts Festival, and then at a similar event in Hobart, Tasmania. The name derived from their first show, protesting battery chicken farming. Evans later described Furious Chicken as "a three-piece feminist theatre and music and general silliness outfit". They moved to Perth in 1982 and performed together for around three years.

Wimmins Circus influenced other performers in Perth, and, according to Peta Tait (1994), it "influenced a decade of Australian women's work in physical theatre".

In 1991, the Women's Circus was established in Melbourne by Donna Jackson, inspired by Wimmins Circus.

=== Individual members afterwards ===
Co-founder Ollie Black went on to co-found Lollie's Warehouse and Harpies Bizarre in Sydney, and founded Vitalstatistix in Adelaide in 1984.

Sue Bradley became a professional tuba player, in 1982 a member of an all-women jazz cabaret group called Red Hot Mommas in Sydney.

As of 1990, Christine Evans was musician in residence at the W.A. Trades and Labour Council.

Nina Bondarenko and Eve Glenn, along with Hellen Sky (who had been a founding member of Circus Oz and APG), Fran Kelly, Sylvie Leber, and Vicki Bell, formed a feminist new wave musical group called Girls' Garage Band in the early 1980s, which later changed its name to Toxic Shock. The band performed at universities, pubs, and women's events in Melbourne, and recorded three of their original songs. A photograph of the band taken by Sue Ford featured in a retrospective exhibition of her work at the NGV in 2014. Bell played guitar, while Bondarenko was the band's drummer, but the latter departed around the time it rebranded as Toxic Shock.

Eve Glenn had studied art before joining the Wimmins Circus. After Toxic Shock, she went on to play in Barbies Dead. She then worked as a freelancing scenic artist, painting set, props, and floors for TV, theatre, circus, and films, and also painted for industries such as construction, entertainment, and visual merchandising. She designed, made, and painted parade banners and floats, and even painted trams. Her work has been exhibited, and is held in collections. A large number of her own collection of posters (designed by her and others) were auctioned in October 2024.

== In film ==
Amazing Scenes was a 1980 documentary film about Australian fringe theatre, directed by Karl McPhee, narrated by Spike Milligan, and produced by Film Australia. The film featured Wimmins Circus, along with David Argue, Circus Oz, Clowneroonies (featuring Geoffrey Rush), Reg Livermore, Los Trios Ringbarkus, Alan Pentland, Rod Quantock, St Martins Youth Arts Centre, Cappriccios, Kirribilli Pub Theatre, Sideshow, and Lobotomy Brothers. The DVD is available from the NFSA.
