= Shadowland Theatre =

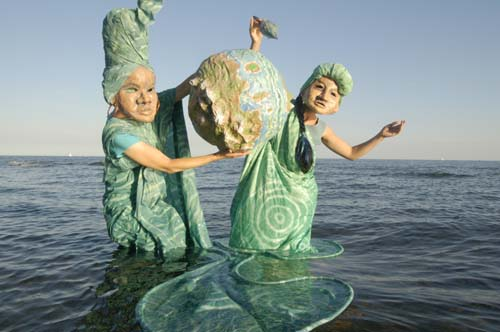
- Company type: non profit
- Industry: Entertainment: Community art
- Founded: 1983
- Headquarters: Toronto, Ontario, Canada
- Area served: Toronto
- Key people: Anne Barber and Brad Harley (artistic directors)
- Website: www.shadowlandtheatre.ca

Shadowland Theatre is a community arts theatre and collective of visual and theatre artists on Toronto Island. It is a professional, not-for-profit theatre company and registered charity, incorporated in 1994.

== History ==
The arts performance company Shadowland (legal name, Shadowland Repertory Company) was founded in 1982 by Whitney Smith and Victor Coleman with a mandate of producing musicals using shadow puppetry and other alternative theatrical media. The company was named after the early Hollywood screen monthly, Shadowland (magazine). The company's first production, Radio Ghost, a musical about the fictional meeting of Canadian radio inventor Reginald Fessenden and radio diva Jessica Dragonette, was co-written by Smith and Coleman and toured artist-run centres across Canada.

During the World Stage in 1982, the British company Welfare State International worked in collaboration with the Toronto Island community to produce the Tempest on Snake Island. Inspired by this production, Island residents Smith, Sarah Miller and Jerry Englar created proposals that raised funds for a second Shadowland production, along the same lines, to be part of the city's 1984 sesquicentennial celebrations. Welfare State principals Boris and Maggie Howarth were hired to assist and the result was Island Follies, a historical fantasia.

In 1985, Smith and Coleman handed over the company to the key group of Toronto Island artists who worked on the show – Kathleen Doody, Leida Englar, Jerry Englar, Brad Harley and Sarah Miller. The company was eventually renamed Shadowland Theatre.

Shadowland's early development was significantly influenced by Welfare State's format of professional artists engaging communities in collective performance, and this method has become the backbone of Shadowland's way of working ever since. Other major influences are Bread and Puppet Theater, Peter Minshall and Trinidad Carnival (leading to many years of involvement in Caribana parades) and ongoing working relationships with many Caribbean artists. These influences have contributed to Shadowland's bold and visually distinctive form of theatre and performance events. In the past decade the theatre has created signature processional outdoor theatre performances and collaborated with a wide range of communities and artists from many disciplines.

== Current projects ==
Annual Ward's Island Fire Parade

Mystery Play

Place at the Table

Crude-mentary Tales

It's Who We Are

Sarnia Art Walk Sarnia, Ontario

== Productions ==
The Light That Stands Still Toronto Island

The Traveling Medicine Show Toronto Island

Stories of Our Island Toronto Island

The Order of Good Cheer Toronto Island

The Essence of Ambrose Ichor Toronto Island

The Lost Supper Tarragon Theatre, Annex Theatre (2004) Toronto

The Bridge Toronto Island (1980)

Right of Passage Toronto Island

Quixsand

== See also ==
- Community art
- Community theatre
- Kensington Market
- Mask
- Kathleen McDonnell
- Ruth Howard (artist)
