= Betty Can Jump =

Betty Can Jump was a group-devised feminist theatre performance that was first performed in January 1972 at the Pram Factory in Melbourne, Australia.

== Background and premise ==
The name is derived from John and Betty, a Victorian Department of Education children's reader from 1951, where the male/female protagonists were stereotypes, playing with truck and dog and pram and cat, respectively.

The play satirised ocker characters.

== Creators and cast ==
Participants in the performance included Claire Dobbin, Helen Garner, Evelyn Krape, Jude Kuring, Yvonne Marini, and Kerry Dwyer. It was directed by Dwyer, Sarah de Jong composed the music, and Mick Allan was responsible for stage design.

== Performances ==
Betty Can Jump was rehearsed at the Australian Performing Group's Pram Factory, then located in Carlton, Victoria.

It was first performed on 26 January 1971 and ran until 5 March 1972.

== Impact ==
Betty Can Jump led to the formation of the Women's Theatre Group in Melbourne in 1974. The group's performances included Out of the Frying Pan (1974), Sister's Delight Festival (1974), She'll be Right Mate (1976), and Edges (1977).

Betty Can Jump had a significant impact on the development of feminist theatre and thought through the 1970s. The performance was created partly as a reaction to working in the male-dominated APG, and had a very positive response. It also inspired many performers, writers, directors and others around the country, such as the Adelaide Women's Theatre Group and the Fool's Gallery in Canberra, as well as the acrobatic group Circus Oz (which spawned Wimmins Circus in 1979).
