= Sick Muse Art Projects =

Non-profit arts organisation

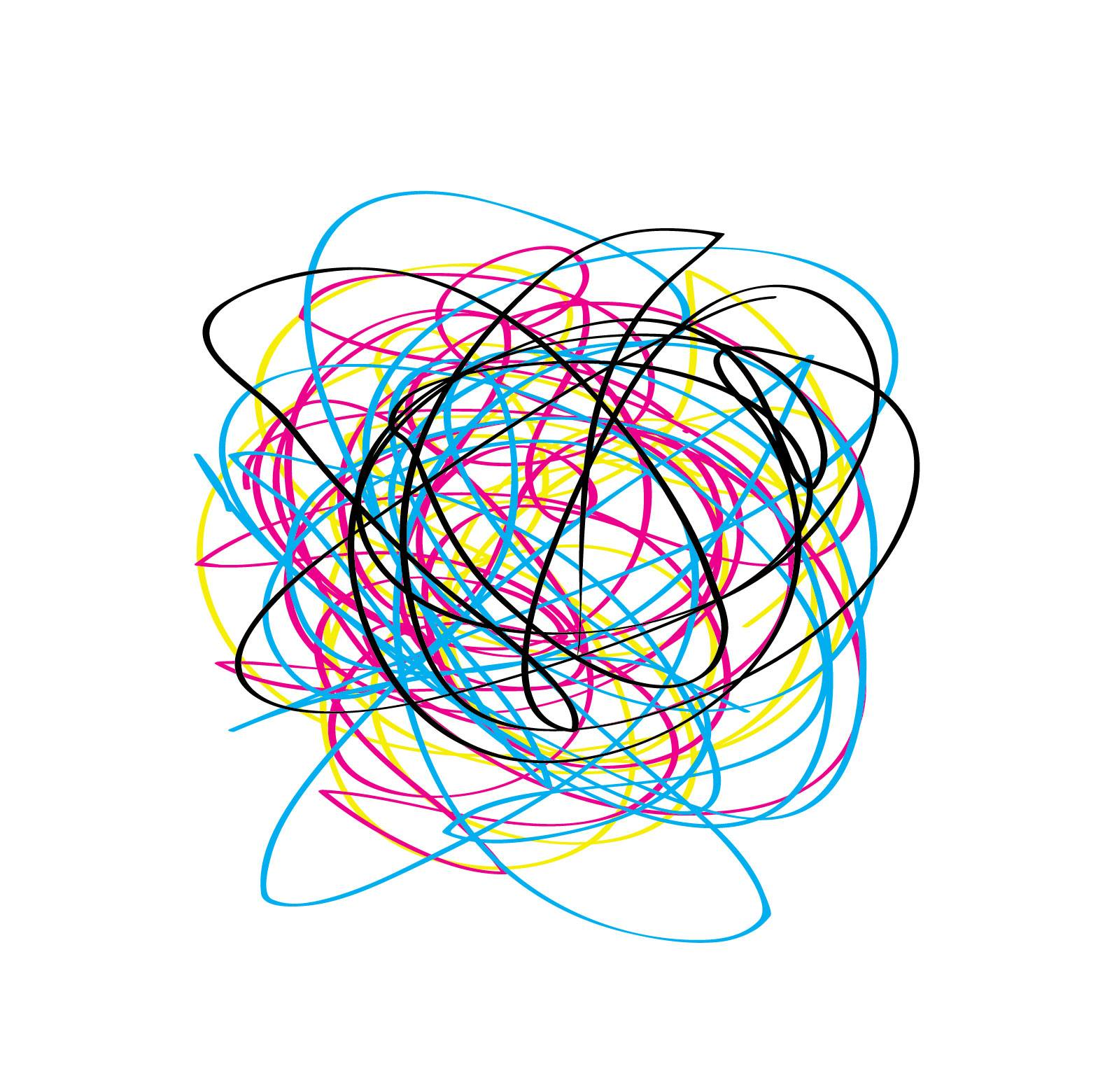
Sick Muse Art Projects Logo

Sick Muse Art Projects is a community-based, non-profit arts organization co-founded by Colombian writer Paola Gomez and visual artist Alex Usquiano. It is located in Toronto, Ontario.

== Overview ==
Sick Muse Art Projects operates under the principles of inclusion and social justice. Projects are free of cost for participants, funded by the Toronto Arts Council. The organization uses the arts to promote conversations aiming to eliminate any form of discrimination. Sick Muse has worked with newcomers and refugees, in particular with children. "Our World of A Thousand Colours" offers art workshops to kids living in shelters and refugee houses in Toronto.

Sick Muse provides arts and social justice education in three ways:

- Community arts—Developing art-based projects for vulnerable populations, including new immigrants, refugees, and families who have experienced violence.
- Activism and public education—Promoting social justice and achieving equality and inclusion for all members of society. Sick Muse uses art as a way to explore and engage communities in conversations of social justice.
- Support for emerging and newcomer artists in Toronto—The organization offers support to emerging artists from equity-seeking groups to showcase their work and to access grant opportunities and professional development.
