= Cigar Factory Artist Studios =

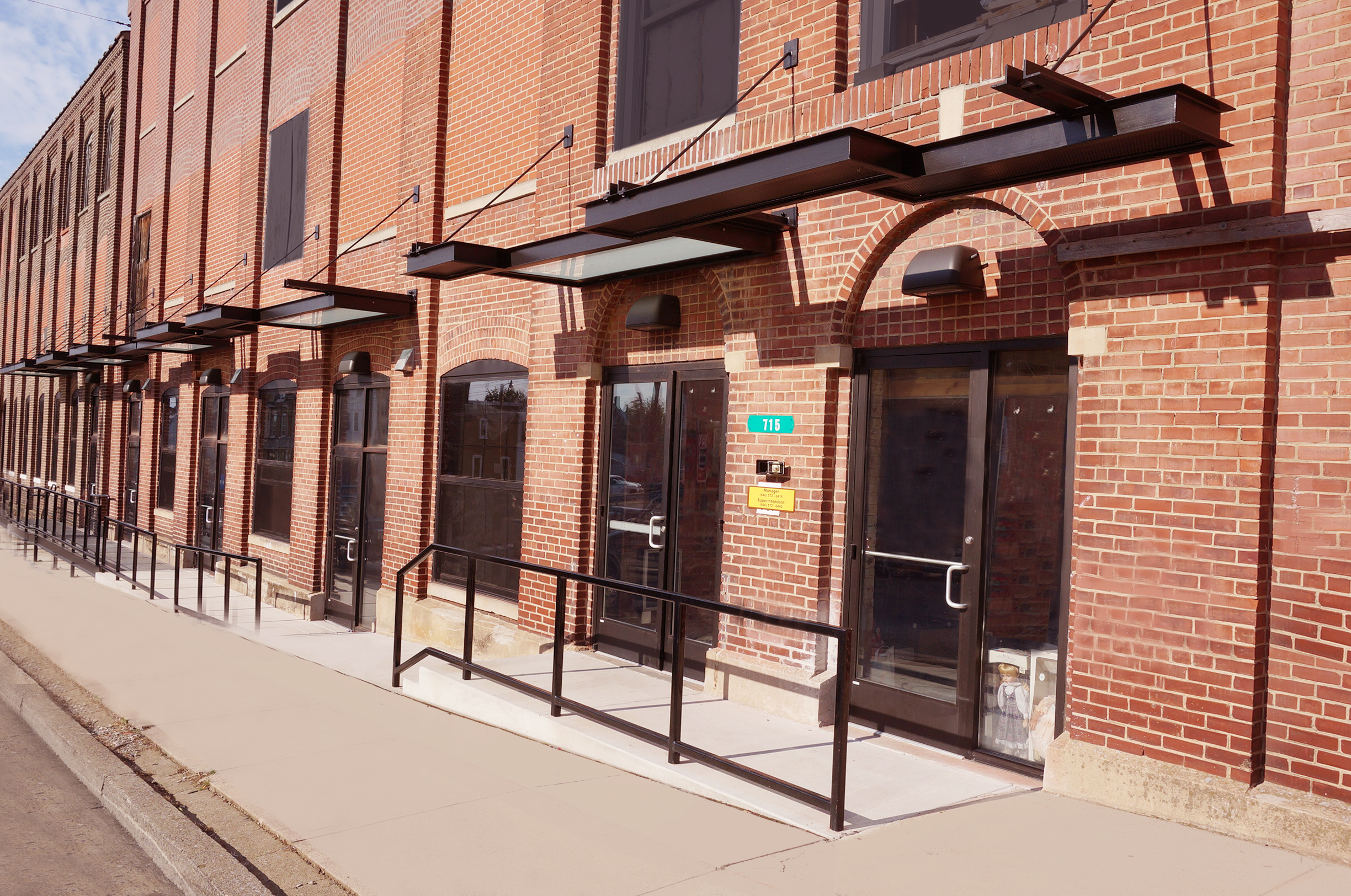
- Cigar Factory Artist Studios in Allentown, Pennsylvania, August 2013
- Interactive map of the Cigar Factory Artist Studios area
- Alternative names: Bondy and Lederer Cigar Company

General information
- Status: Completed
- Architectural style: Factory Building
- Location: 707 North 4th Street, Allentown, Pennsylvania, United States
- Coordinates: 40°36′42″N 75°28′09″W
- Current tenants: Alternative Artist Gallery
- Completed: 1900

Technical details
- Structural system: Masonry
- Floor count: 5
- Floor area: 101,239

Website
- cigarfactoryartists.com

The Cigar Factory Artist Studios is an emerging artist community in Allentown, Pennsylvania’s art district. The site formerly belonged to the Bondy and Lederer Cigar Company, and consists of a 101,239 square-foot repurposed cigar factory on North 4th and Green Street. Today the building houses galleries, shops, and 45 artist studios.

== Historical overview of Allentown's industries ==
Throughout history, Allentown has been a major contender in the manufacturing arena. In the early nineteenth century, the area’s grain production was among the highest in the country, and by the middle of the century, the Industrial Revolution was well underway. The Lehigh Valley Railroad exported load after load of Allentown’s iron and steel. By the turn of the twentieth century, the city had greatly diversified their economy and was now producing silk, beer, and cigars.

== The cigar factory ==
The factory building located at 707 North 4th Street was built between 1898 and 1900, for the purpose of cigar production. The New York-based Bondy and Lederer Cigar Company were notable tobacco merchants and cigar manufacturers that employed 600 cigar rollers at their New York City headquarters in the late 19th century. They chose Allentown for their business expansion because of the area’s reputation for its high-quality tobacco production and cigar manufacturing. In 1913–1914, there were nearly 60 cigar manufacturing companies operating and contributing toward federal revenue of $482,505 made as a result of Allentown’s cigar production.

The growing popularity of the cigarette was a large cause of the eventual decline of many cigar companies’ success in Allentown. Cigarette manufacturers were enjoying better success by the 1920s, and their ability to mass-produce the more economical cigarette proved to be too much of a competition for the cigar manufacturers. Against all odds, Bondy and Lederer continued to maintain their presence as a major Allentown cigar manufacturer until the 1960s. After the cigar factory closure, the site was used briefly as a knitting mill. After the knitting mill closed, 707 North 4th Street, along with many of its neighboring factory buildings, stood vacant.

Today, the city attracts a wide variety of creative manufacturing, art producers, and light industrial companies wanting to lease space in the area. There is a lack of available land for new construction, and the demand for affordable, structurally-sound space in general is high. There is an attraction to refinished older buildings that have been refinished to meet modern needs.

== Conversion to Lehigh Valley’s largest arts building ==
The former Bondy and Lederer factory building currently houses commercial space utilized by apparel manufacturers, and in 2012 the owner and developer secured a contractor that would redevelop remaining space into retail and office space, 45 artist studios, and a community art gallery. Evidence of the 28,000 square-foot building's original purpose remains present, such as the first floor's tobacco blowing tubes, where tobacco leaves were transported through the factory.

The North of Tilghman neighborhood, or No-Tie district, is a concentrated area of working artists and other creative minds that are enthusiastic and advocating for redevelopment projects. This site in particular is unique in that the building and its revitalized surrounding area caters to artists and others producing within the creative arena.

Furthermore, there are efforts underway to revitalize the surrounding neighborhood with the support of city officials, including the mayor's office and the Allentown Tenants' Association. In support of these efforts, Brandon Wunder, the director of the Alternative Art Gallery and a tenant of The Cigar Factory, has hosted tours of the studio building for the city officials. He has also planned and promoted live music performances, film screenings and festivals. Wunder and his non-profit organization originated the Allentown ArtsFest in 2014, which is a three-day event held at Cedar Beach Park that highlights Allentown's art culture with more than 300 vendors, artists, and performers contributing.

Because of these efforts, there is a noticeable trend toward an improved downtown area, and therefore the Cigar Factory Artist Studios has been well received by the community and celebrated by city officials. Weekly open house events, workshops for children, and art installations are hosted by the Alternative Art Gallery and neighboring tenants. Events feature original works by occupants of the Cigar Factory, as well as other notable area artists. Private studio spaces are often open to the public during these events. Since the ribbon cutting ceremony held on November 19, 2013, the Cigar Factory Artist Studios has grown to become Lehigh Valley's largest arts building.

== Gallery ==
Cigar Factory

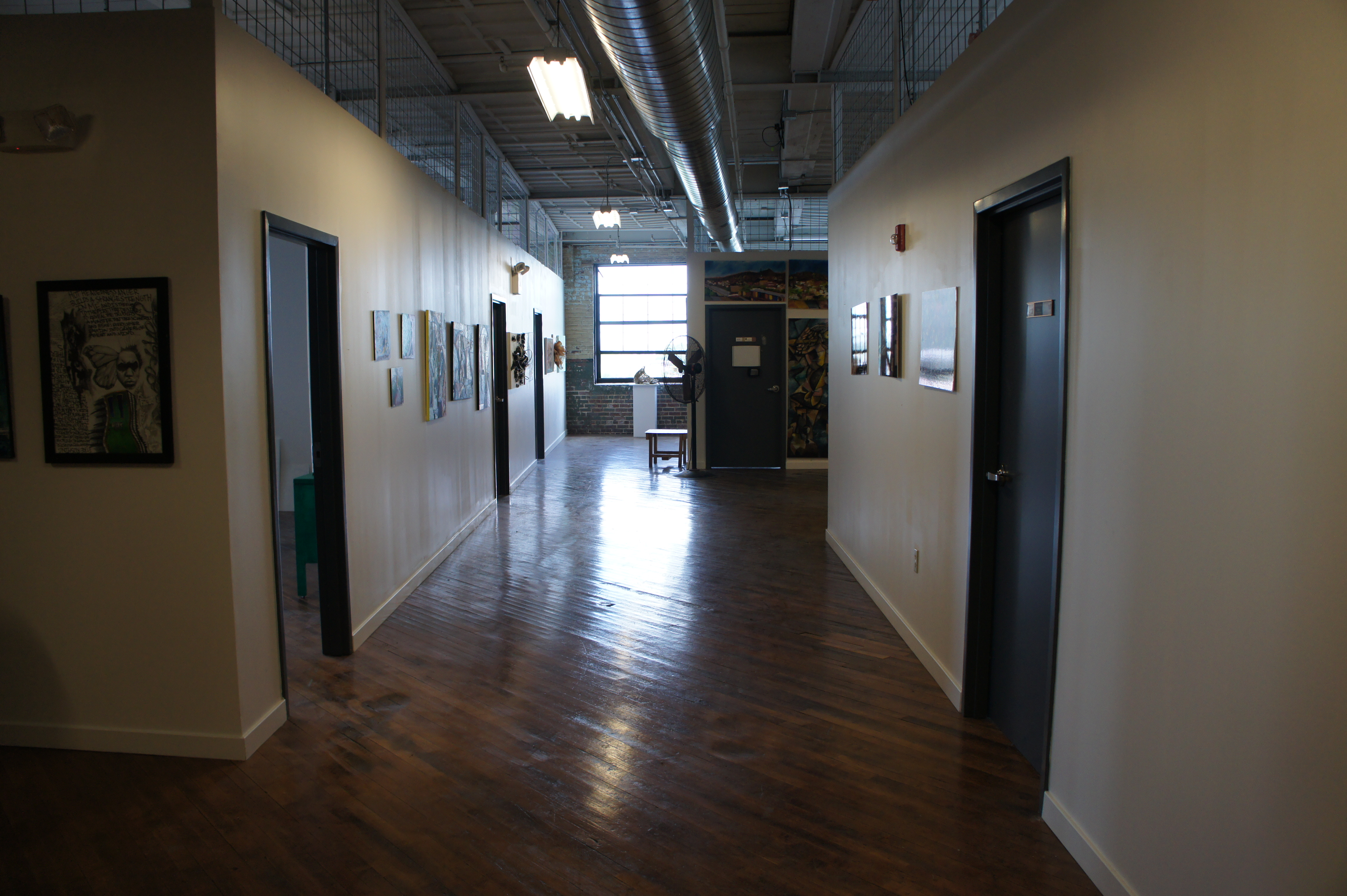
Gallery

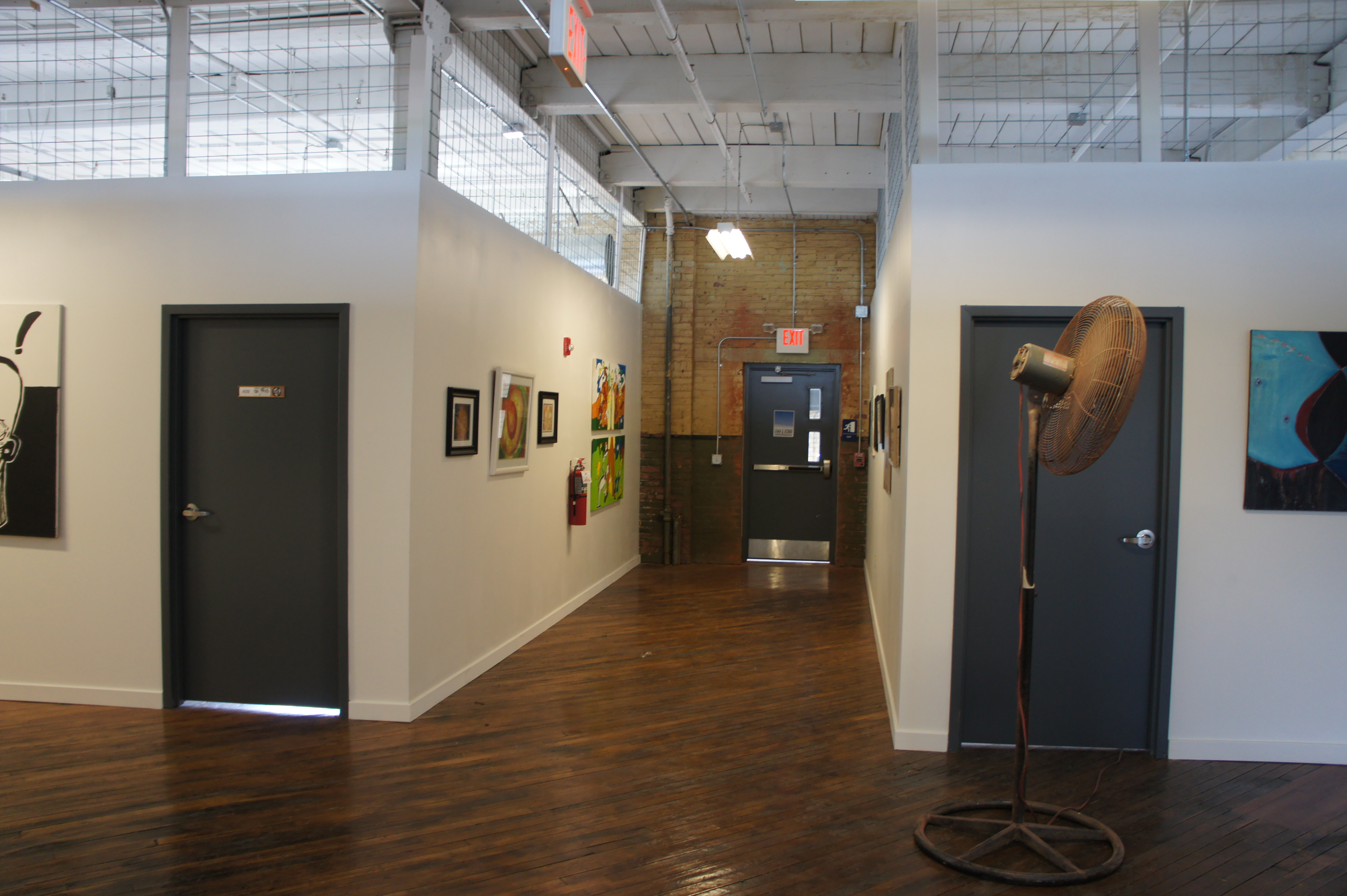
Gallery

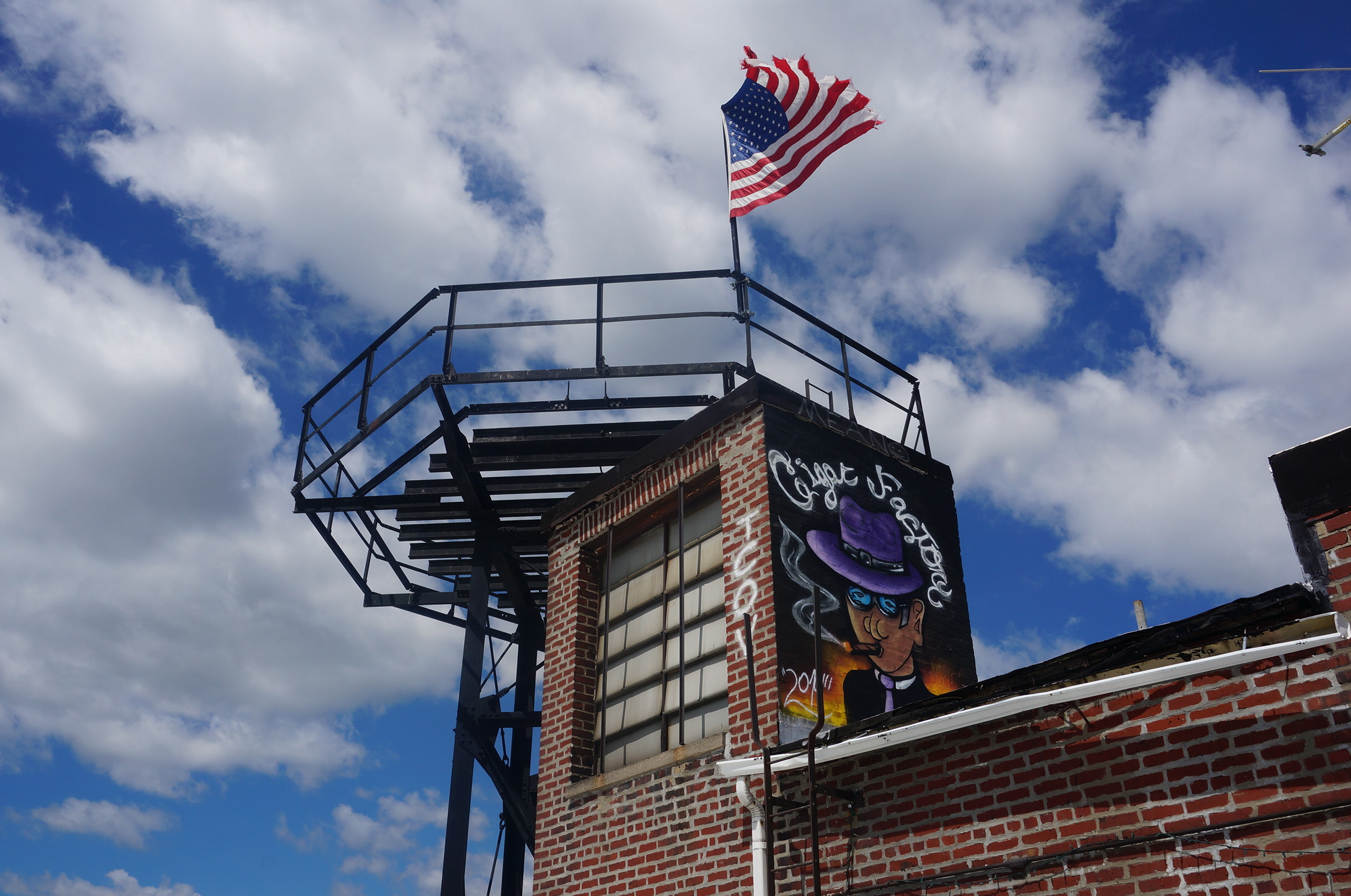
Tower

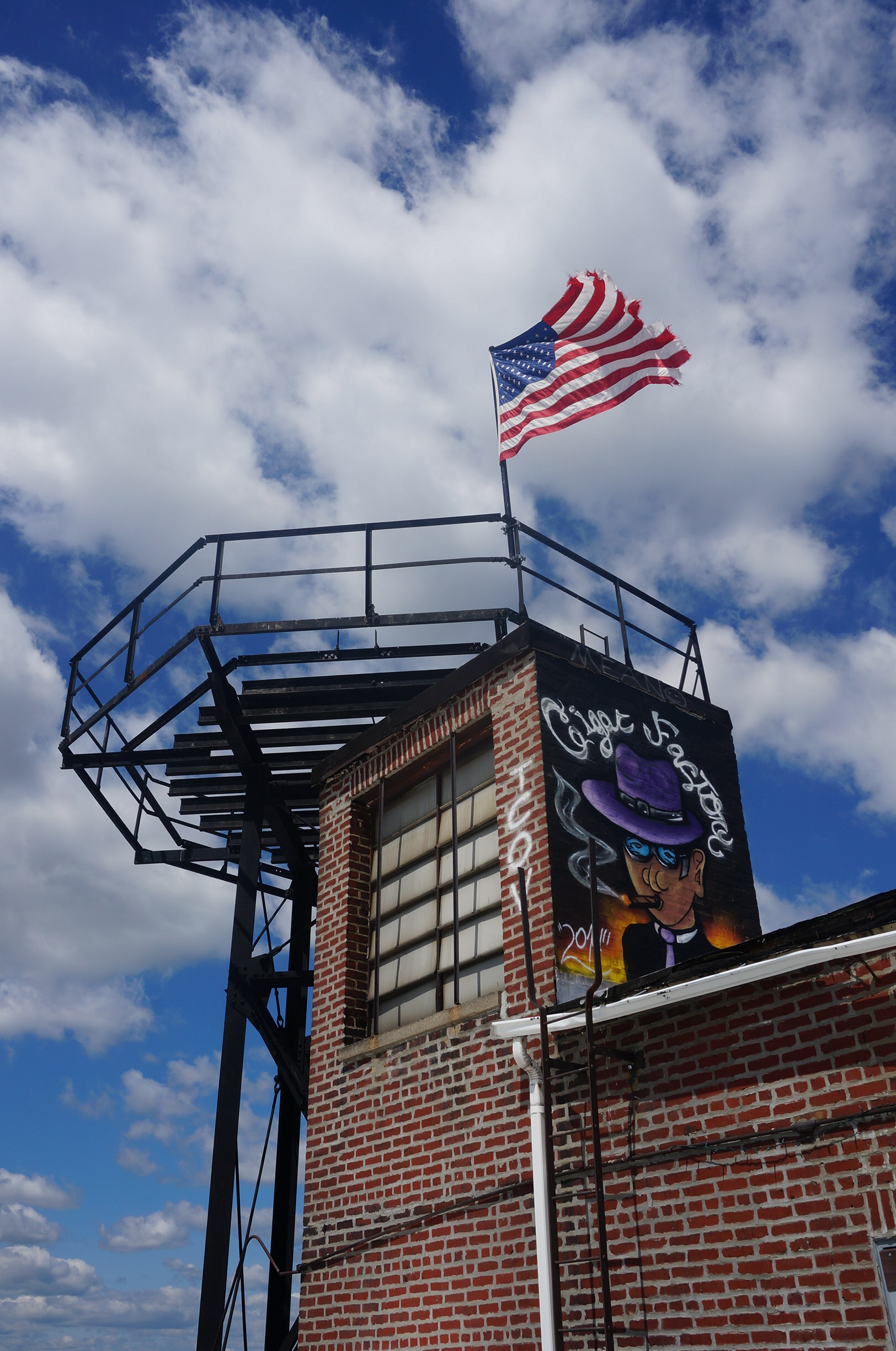
Cigar Factory Tower

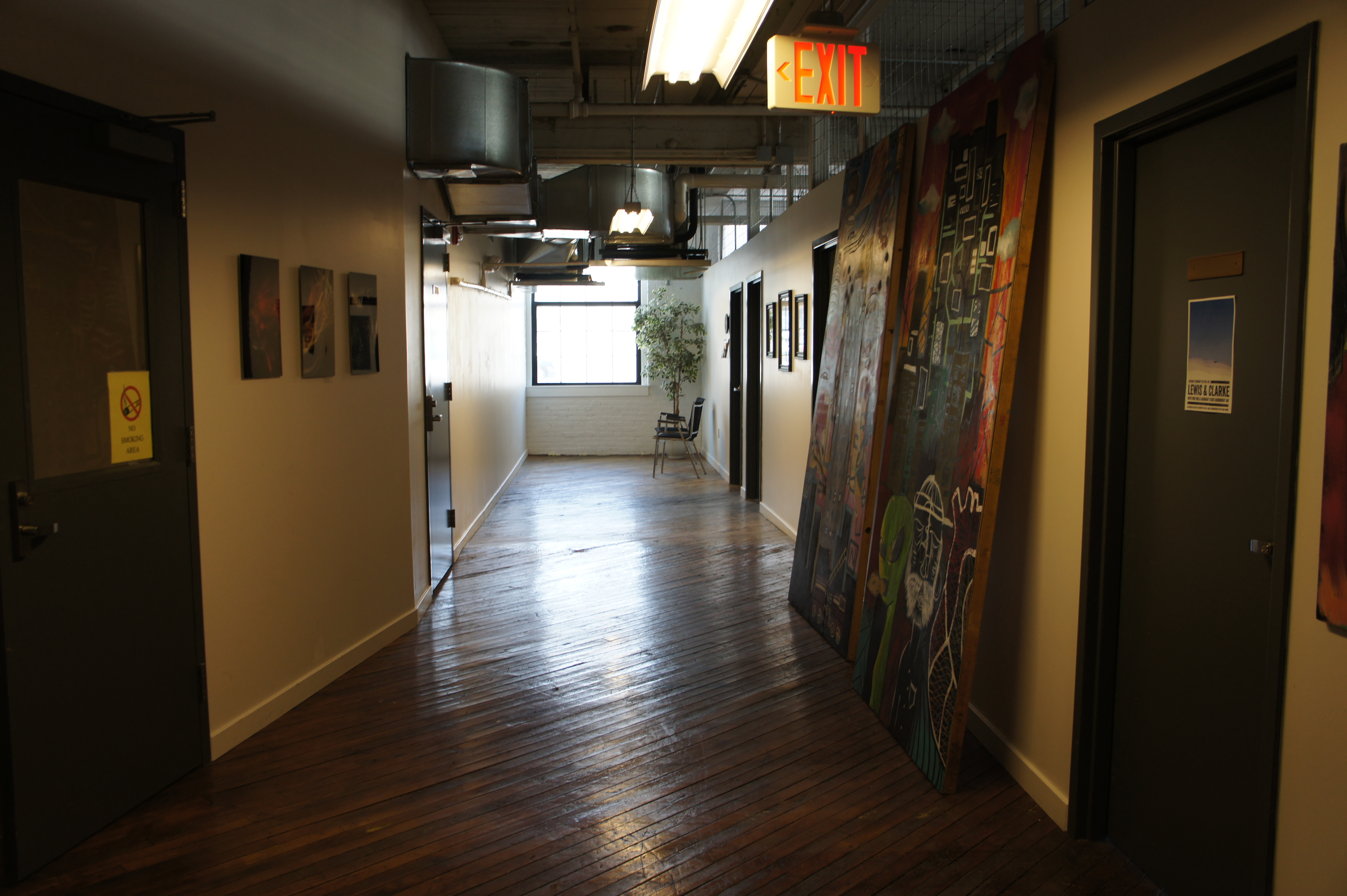
Common Area Gallery
