= T. J. Eckleberg =

Australian musician and theatre director

T. J. Eckleburg is a musician, producer, poet and theatre director originally from Sydney. He was the artistic director at Shopfront, an Australian contemporary arts centre between 2004 and 2010. His name comes from Dr. T. J. Eckleburg, a fictional oculist in The Great Gatsby. He has lived in London, Berlin, and Kyoto.

== Music ==
Eckleberg has featured in collaborations and projects with Morganics, Deepchild, Inga Lijlestrom, and Tokyo Snow Monkeys. He was a founding member of The DeltaHorse with Dana Colley.

== Discography ==
- Revisionator, 2023 – Akimbo Records
- Spirit Level, 2021 – Akimbo Records
- Hikari, 2020 – Akimbo Records
- Black & Amber, 2016 – Akimbo Records
- This Might Feel Like Home, 2014 – Akimbo Records
- West & Lime, 2012 -
- When You Get Down To It, 2008 – Independent Release
- Illumineon, 2003 – Akimbo Records
- SUPERHYDRATED, 2000 – Akimbo Records
- Waiting Room (EP), 1997 – Pokey Records
- Leomund's Tiny Piano (unreleased)

== Theatre projects ==
His projects fuse technology and multi-media across disciplines, with an immersive approach to theatre – incorporating sound design, organic approaches to lighting, design and movement. In 1999 his experiences with Welfare State International led him to create two large-scale site specific performances with boys at Birrong Boys High School – one of Sydney's tougher schools. In his time at Shopfront he has directed CODA (2003) with residents of the Juvenile Justice system; How Sachi Lost His Leg (2004) – a site specific spectacular combining puppetry and Capoeira; Wadya Call Me? (2004) – in a back lane, incorporating a 4 x 4m rolling screen, puppetry, live radio broadcast, and 19m graffiti wall created during the performance. In 2005, he directed Angels in the Architecture – creating an aerial urban ghetto and song cycle with an integrated ensemble of performers with and without disabilities. In 2006 he directed POP UP! an interactive three-dimensional multimedia pop up book, in and around the Shopfront complex. A City of Shadows and Ice was one of Shopfront's largest productions, being performed in August 2007 with the set made from ice and featuring Parkour artists. Lost Toy Story was performed in the laneways of Hurstville in 2008.
