= Train of thought (disambiguation) =

Train of thought is the sequence of thought or speech.

The expression may also refer to:

- Train of Thought (Dream Theater album), 2003
- Train of Thought (Reflection Eternal album), 2000
- "Train of Thought" (A-ha song), 1986
- "Train of Thought" (Cher song), 1974
- Train of Thought (Community Arts Tour)
