= Women's Circus =

Australian feminist arts organisation

The Women's Circus, a feminist not for profit organisation, provides circus performance training and social arts projects for women, trans, and non-binary people in the western region of Melbourne, Victoria, Australia. Training programs focus on the physical and imaginative potential of the human body, self-awareness and self-esteem. It has a history of original productions with social, educational, and health themes related to women's lives.

== History ==
The inspiration for the Women's Circus was built on the work of an earlier Wimmins Circus, Australia's first women's circus established in Melbourne, which ran from 1978 to 1981.

The Women's Circus began in 1991, as an initiative of the Footscray Community Arts Centre, offering training and performance projects. Women recognised as founders include Donna Jackson, director; Sally Forth, trainer; and Elizabeth Walsh, director of the Footscray Community Arts Centre. Jean Taylor, who joined the Women's Circus in 1991, went on to establish the Performing Older Women's Circus in 1995.

The Women's Circus toured Beijing in 1995 as part of the United Nations' Conference on Women, and performed and ran workshops in regional France in 2012. It has won several awards from Arts Victoria and the Melbourne Fringe Festival.

In 2006, the organisation moved to the Drill Hall, Footscray, and started receiving support from the Maribyrnong City Council.

== Training ==
In addition to intermediate and advanced training programs, the circus offers a program for people who have no experience in circus training. Participants learn a range of skills, including hula-hooping, juggling, trapeze, swings, acro-balance (making pyramids), climbing and tumbling.

== Publications ==
- Women's Circus (Footscray Community Arts Centre) (1996), Newsletter, Footscray Community Arts Centre

== Productions ==
Past productions include:

- The Drill | Director: Penelope Bartlau, 2019
- Night Circus | Director: Penelope Bartlau, 2017
- Fluidity | Director: Penelope Bartlau, 2017
- The Penelopiad | Director: Steph Kehoe, 2016
- Soar | Director: Steph Kehoe, 2013
- What Do I Want? | Director: Spenser Inwood, 2013
- Red Hot Flush | Director: Deb Batton, 2012
- Leggings are Not Pants | Director: Sarah Pheasant, 2012
- Out of the Box | Director: Franca Stadler, 2012
- Snakes and Ladders | Director: Deb Batton, 2011
- Ladies Prefer Brunettes | Director: Sarah Pheasant, 2011
- Quite Contrary | Director: Deb Batton, 2010
- Melbourne City Baths Show | Directors: Sarah Pheasant & Franca Stadler, 2010
- Betty | Director: Felicia O'Brien, 2010
- Herstory | Director: Felicia O'Brien, 2009
- Here, Where We've Always Been | Director: Nadia Kotisch, 2008
- Antechamber | Director: Annie Davey, 2007
- A Plane Without Wings is a Rocket | Director: Annie Davey, 2006
- Daddy | Director: Donna Jackson, 2005
- Maribyrnong Pool Opening Show | Director: Donna Jackson, 2005
- Sacred | Director: Kate Sulan, 2004
- Odditorium | Director: Andrea Lemon, 2003
- Ghosts | Director: Andrea Lemon, 2003
- Secrets | Director: Sarah Cathcart, 2001
- The Island | Director: Sarah Cathcart, 2000
- Lilith | Director: Sarah Cathcart, 1999
- Night Flying | Director: Sarah Cathcart 1999
- Soles of Our Feet | Director: Sarah Cathcart 1998
- Swimming with Sharks | Director: Sarah Cathcart 1998
- Pope Joan | Director: Sarah Cathcart, 1997
- Leaping the Wire | Director: Donna Jackson, 1995
- Death, The Musical | Director: Donna Jackson, 1994
- Women and Sport | Director: Donna Jackson, 1993
- Women and Work | Director: Donna Jackson, 1992
- Women and Institutions | Director: Donna Jackson, 1991

== See also ==
- List of circuses and circus owners
