= Shopfront Arts Co-op =

Theatre and studios in Sydney, Australia

Shopfront Arts Co-Op
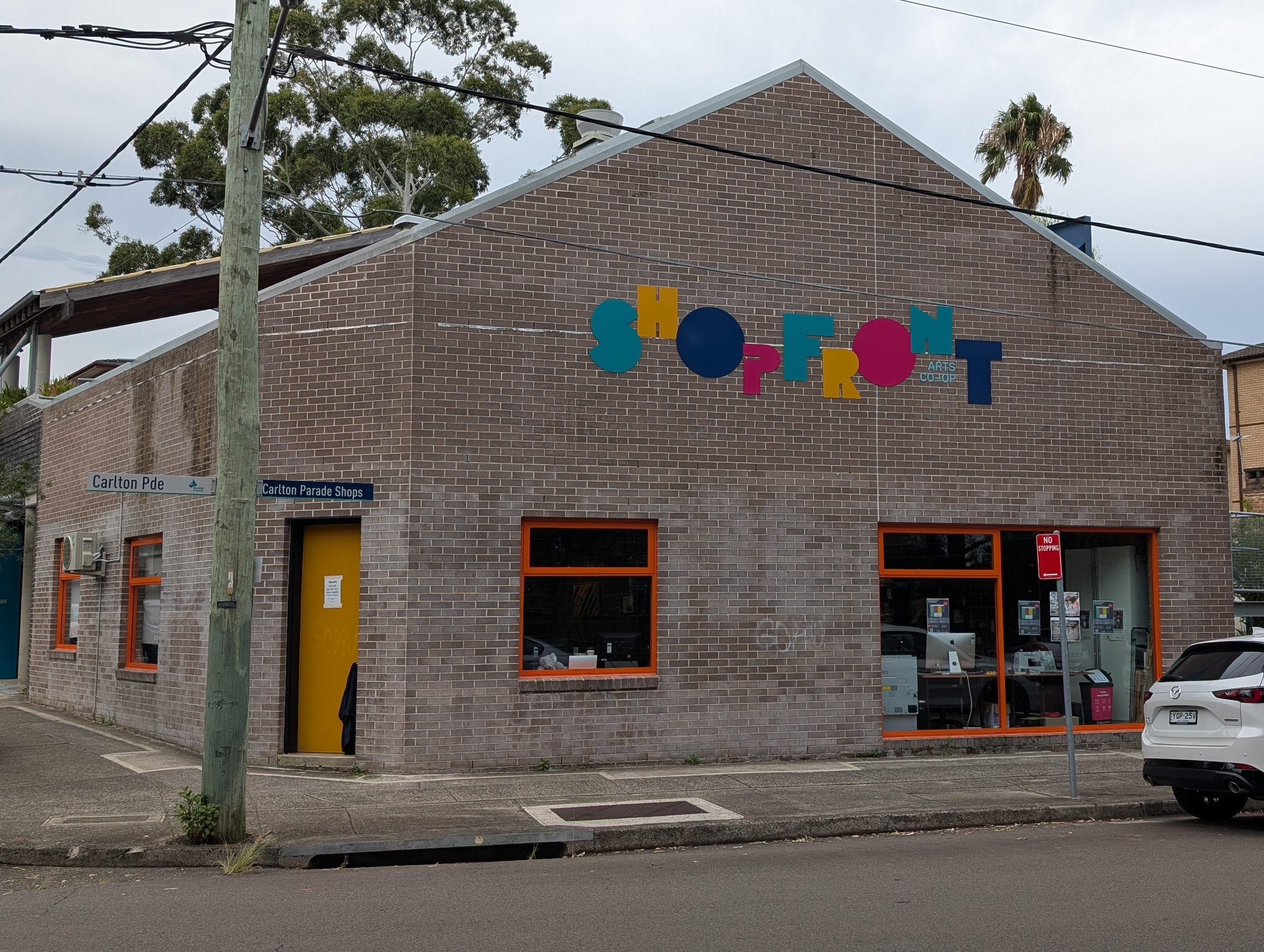
- Current façade
- Formation: 1976
- Location: Carlton, NSW, Australia
- CEO and Creative Director: Natalie Rose
- Director of Access and Inclusion: Lauren Houston
- Young Leader: Sophie Ward
- Website: shopfront.org.au

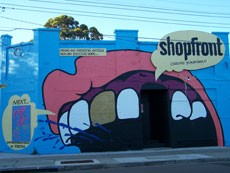
Previous façade

Shopfront Arts Co-op is a youth arts cooperative in Australia. They are located in Carlton, Sydney. For 50 years, it has championed the creative voices of Young People through collaborative, cross-disciplinary performance-making. Established in 1976, Shopfront operates as a member-driven co-operative, providing training, mentorship, and production opportunities for artists aged 8–26.

The organisation presents a year-round program of workshops, performances, festivals, and emerging artist and technician development initiatives that emphasise creative agency and social connection.

Shopfront partners with schools, local councils, national arts institutions and venues to deliver access-focused programs and touring works, and maintains a strong commitment to inclusivity through initiatives designed for young artists with disability and those from underrepresented communities.

Shopfront is one of Australia’s longest-running youth-led arts organisations.

Several well-known people in the entertainment industry have started careers there or taught there, including Paul Capsis, Andrew Upton, Trevor Ashley and Julia Zemiro.

== History ==
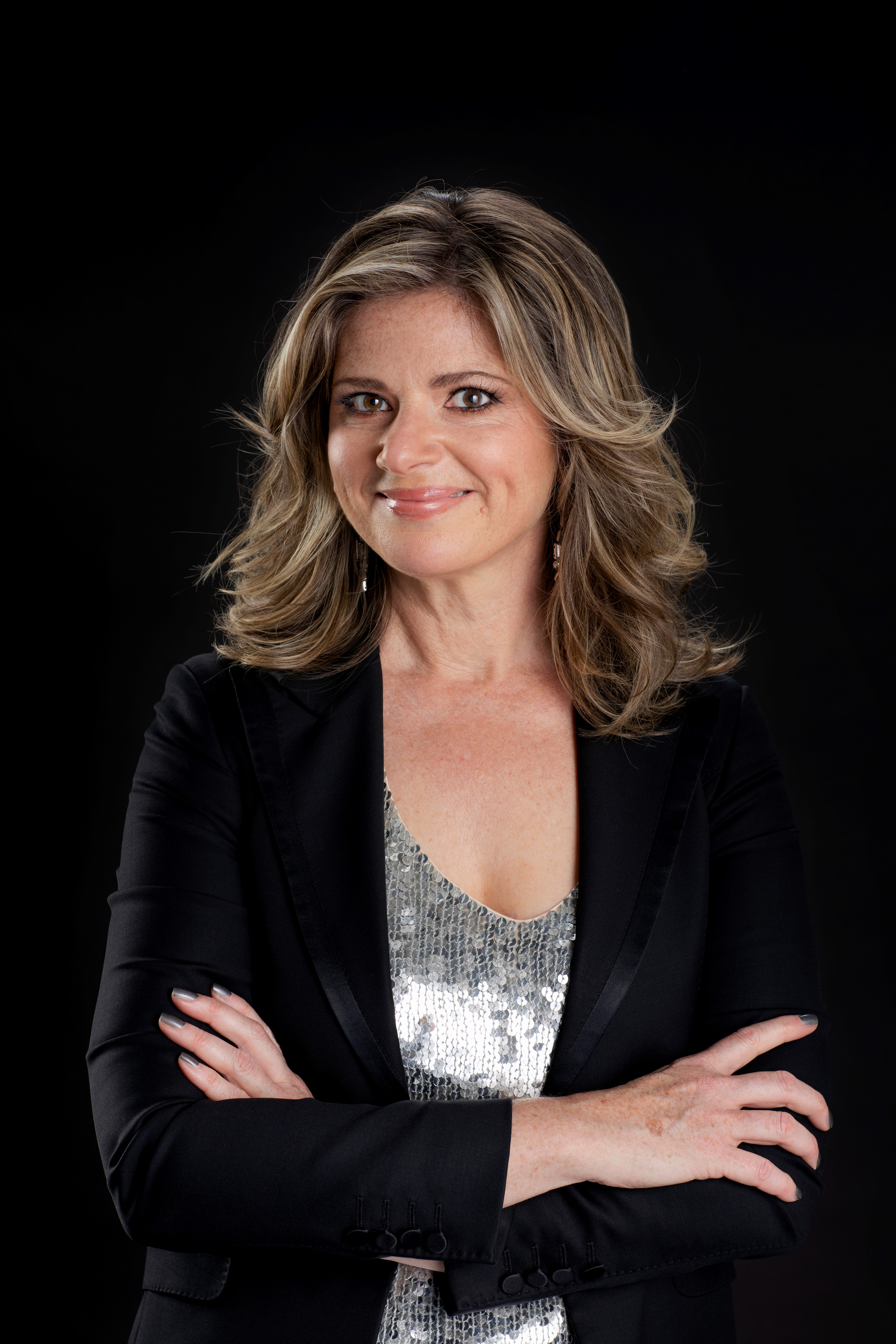
Comedian and artistic director Julia Zemiro has been one of the teaching staff at Shopfront.

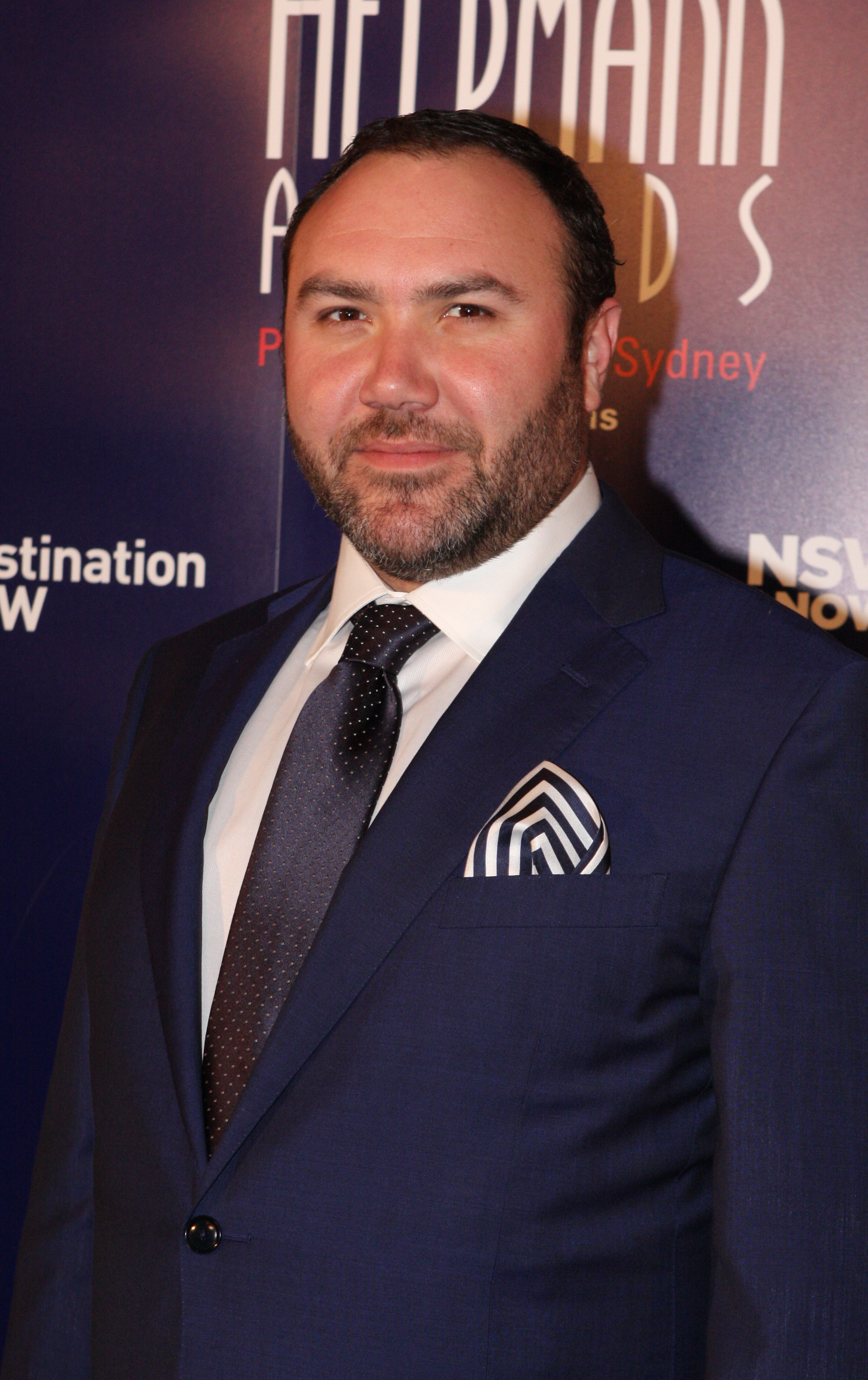
Trevor Ashley, seen at the Helpmann Awards, began his acting and performance career at Shopfront

Shopfront Arts Co-op began as St George Theatre for Young People in 1976 by Errol Bray and Garry Fry, two theatre directors committed to creating a platform where Young People could write and perform their own stories. In the words of Bray: "Too often the expression and creative ability of young people is patronised or ignored."

It began in a dancehall on Carlton Parade, an adjacent house and two shops – a women's fashion store and a butcher shop – hence the name Shopfront.

Shopfront’s earliest productions in the late 1970s reflected a distinctive commitment to ensemble-devised performance, with adult artists working alongside Young People to create original theatre rooted in lived experience. Responding to significant demand for youth-led creative opportunities, the organisation soon formalised a year-round program of workshops for participants aged 8–25, establishing one of Australia’s first sustained pathways for Young People to develop theatre-making skills outside a school environment.

Through the 1980s and 1990s, Shopfront expanded its artistic scope, integrating contemporary performance, visual art, film, and digital media into its programs and evolving into a nationally recognised hub for experimentation and interdisciplinary collaboration. The Co-op became known for centring voices often absent from mainstream arts institutions, including young artists with disability, LGBTQIA+ young people, and those from diverse cultural and socioeconomic backgrounds.

Today, Shopfront is regarded as a leading youth arts organisation in Australia, commissioning new work, touring regionally and nationally, and offering extensive training and development opportunities for emerging artists. Its programs support generations of young creatives, many of whom have gone on to prominent careers in theatre, film, community arts, and cultural leadership.

Notable productions include The Greening of the Common, (about the Greenham Common Women's Peace Camp); Detective Story by Sidney Kingsley and Jean-Paul Sartre's In Camera, Romeo and Juliet in 2015. Its company was invited to perform Piece by Piece for International Youth Year at the United Nations in June 1985.

In 1979 the co-operative raised money to buy the building – through 50-hour Actathons, costume parades, raffles, income from show, donations they raised $43,000, and with the additional help of Rockdale and Hurstville Council, the NSW Government, with a bank loan the building was purchased by the young people's co-op. Thirty years later Shopfront was still at the venue but had shortened its name to Shopfront.

The organisation shut down 1990 for seven years, to be re-established in 1997 when, thanks to funding from Australia Council for the Arts and the Member for Banks, the site was redeveloped as a three-storey creative arts and community centre for the region.

On 7 August 1980, social circus troupe Wimmins Circus, touring from Melbourne, performed at Shopfront.

== Australian National Young Playwrights Weekend ==
From 1977 Shopfront initiated and hosted the Australian National Young Playwrights Weekend. Held annually, this weekend congress brought together youth from all over the country who were actively writing for live theatre. Local professional acting and writing talent such Max Gillies as Anna Volska and Pamela Van Amstel volunteered as mentors, and attendees' plays would be workshopped privately or performed in full in the Shopfront theatre space. The event ran into the 1990s.

In 1984 the concept evolved to become the ambitious "World Interplay", billed as The 1st International Festival of Young Playwrights, which drew more than 40 participants from the UK, Europe, Central America, and the US. The first patrons of the festival included Dorothy Hewett, Edward Bond, and Stephen Sondheim.

== Description ==
Shopfront Arts Co-op is located in Carlton, New South Wales. Its stated aim is to provide space, resources, training, and development opportunities for young artists, aged between 8 and 26.

The building includes three rehearsal studios, a sound studio, and digital film editing suite.

== Notable former members ==
- Paul Capsis
- Andrew Upton
- Trevor Ashley
- Hillary Bell
- Julia Zemiro
- Hillary Bell

== Published plays ==
Year	Title	Publisher	Notes
2023	The Lies We Were Told	Australian Plays Transform	Scripted by Natalie Rose, Sharleen Ndlovu and Nicole Pingon. Published as part of the APT Pride Collection 2023.
2025	Mums Tell Dad Jokes Too	Australian Plays Transform	Written by Junior Ensemble 2022, with Tasha O'Brien and Nicole Pingon.
2025	Stop. Drop. And Listen.	Australian Plays Transform	Written by Senior Ensemble 2023, with Lily Hayman and Hayden Tonazzi.
2025	Teen Angst	Australian Plays Transform	Written by Senior Ensemble 2022, with Lucy Heffernan.

== Discography ==
Tender (Original Musical Soundtrack)

- Written by: Junior Ensemble 2023
- Released: February 15, 2024
- Label: DistroKid

== Awards ==
Year	Award	Category	Nominee(s)	Result	Ref.
2023	Sydney Theatre Awards	Best Production for Young People	The Lies We Were Told	Won	
2024	Westfield Local Hero	Westfield Hurstville Local Hero	Zoe Ong for Shopfront Arts Co-op	Won	
2026	Westfield Local Hero	Westfield Hurstville Local Hero	Sophie Ward for Shopfront Arts Co-op	Nominated	
