= Jumblies Theatre =

Canadian nonprofit organization

- Jumblies Theatre
- Company type: Non Profit
- Industry: Entertainment: Community Art
- Founded: 2001
- Founder: Ruth Howard
- Headquarters: Toronto, Ontario, Canada
- Area served: Toronto
- Key people: Ruth Howard, Founder and Keith McNair, Managing Director
- Website: www.jumbliestheatre.org

Jumblies Theatre is a nonprofit theatre organization in Toronto, Canada.

== History ==
Jumblies Theatre was founded in 2001 by Ruth Howard, who served as Artistic Director until 2022 when she stepped aside to make room for new leadership, including Artistic Director Sharada Eswar. In 2014, the organization relocated to its permanent home, The Ground Floor, situated within a Toronto Community Housing building in the CityPlace neighborhood. This space serves as a hub for a series of interconnected initiatives that critically engage with the Indigenous landscapes, histories, and cultural narratives of the Toronto region.

== Practice ==
The Jumblies Theatre has several components: mentorship, consultancy, seminars and symposia, print and digital resources, a community choir, and Artfare Essentials- a week-long course on the principles and practices of art intended to engage and create community.

Jumblies Projects are typically multi-year residencies, which involve hundreds of community participants and dozens of professional artists from a range of disciplines and cultural traditions. Toronto residency neighbourhoods to date include South Riverdale, Lawrence Heights, Davenport-Perth, Central Etobicoke, and Scarborough.

Former Jumblies interns have established independent Offshoot organizations in neighborhoods where Jumblies conducted residencies: Arts4All (Davenport West), MABELLEarts (Central Etobicoke), and The Community Arts Guild (Scarborough).

== Projects ==
- South Riverdale (2001) Project Partners: South Riverdale Community Health Centre, WoodGreen Community Centre, Ralph Thornton Centre, Jimmie Simpson Recreation Centre and Park, Queen Street East Presbyterian Church, Riverdale Community Business Centre, WoodGreen United Church
- Arts4All (2001–2004) Offshoot project (2004–present) Project Partners: Davenport Perth Neighbourhood Centre, the STOP Community Food Centre, Pelham Park (TCHC), Davenport Perth United Church
- Camp Naivelt (2006–2009) Project Partners: United Jewish Peoples Order, Morris Winchevsky Centre, Mayworks Festival
- Jumblies Studio (2007–present) Program Partners: Davenport Perth Neighborhood Centre, Ontario Trillium Foundation, George Cedric Metcalf Charitable Foundation, The J. W. McConnell Family Foundation. This was launched in 2007 as a training and mentorship program. Through the program, artists participate in workshops, learning sessions and apprenticeship opportunities in community arts.
- The Community Arts Guild (2008–2012) Offshoot project (2012–present) Project Partners: Cedar Ridge Studio Gallery, East Scarborough Storefront, Toronto Community Housing Corporation, Ontario Trillium Foundation
- Touching Ground Project Partners: First Story Toronto; Toronto Community Living; Railway Lands Residents Association; Toronto Community Housing Corporation, Continuum Contemporary Music, Evergreen Brick Works, Historic Fort York

== Productions ==
- Twisted Metal and Mermaids Tears (2000)
- I’m Taiping Too! (2001)
- More or the Magic Fish (2002)
- The Land of Three Doors (2003)
- Once A Shoreline (2004)
- Your Name is Written in the Sky (2005)
- Where I’m From (2005)
- Tea and Bridges (2006)
- Bridge of One Hair (2007)
- Hawa Jabril Book Launch (2007)
- Pigeon Creek Pageant (2008)
- Oy Di Velt Vet Vern Yinger (2008–2009)
- Nesting (2009)
- Family Suite (2010)
- Like An Old Tale (2011)
- Train of Thought Tour (2015)
- Touching Ground Festival (2017)
- Four Lands Tour (2016–2018)
- Talking Treaties Spectacle (2017–2018)
- Odaabanaag (2019)

== See also ==
- Community art
- Community theatre
- Ruth Howard
- Ann Jellicoe – Founder of The Colway Trust
