= Alan Lyddiard =

Theatre and film director

Alan Lyddiard (born Michael Hadland Kent; 1949 in London) is a theatre and film director, best known as an advocate of community arts and the ensemble theatre model in the UK. Lyddiard was Artistic Director of Northern Stage, Newcastle upon Tyne (1992–2005), Artistic Director of TAG Theatre Company, Glasgow (1988–1992) and Associate Director at Dundee Rep (1984–1988).

== Career ==
Lyddiard is currently Artistic Director of The Performance Ensemble, a company of older artists creating contemporary theatre for audiences of all ages. He is also an Associate Artist at Leeds Playhouse. He is best remembered for his successful productions of George Orwell's works. His production of Animal Farm (1993) stayed in the repertoire of Northern Stage for twelve years and toured in Spain, France, Netherlands, Israel and across the UK. In 2001 he made a version of 1984 (which has inspired subsequent productions of Lyddiard's adaptation in Paris, Freiburg, New York and New Zealand) and in 2003 he co-produced with Calixto Bieito a version of Orwell's memoir Homage to Catalonia.

Clockwork Orange made in the late 1990s, was another successful production of Lyddiard's with the Northern Stage Ensemble touring the UK for four years.

Lyddiard has always been a strong advocate of the internationalisation of the UK theatre scene. He worked closely and over many years with Lev Dodin, and repeatedly presented Robert Lepage and Peter Brook's work in Newcastle. He has also collaborated with and presented the work of the Belgian director Alain Platel, the Hungarian director Gabor Tompa and the Romani director from FYR Macedonia Rahim Burhan.

In 2003, Lyddiard initiated the Newcastle / Gateshead Gypsy Festival which presented the work of Eastern European and Spanish Romani artists as well as an original piece by the Northern Stage ensemble Black Eyed Roses (which he later reworked for a Romanian production).

Later that year, a Newcastle-based adaptation of Wim Wenders' film Wings of Desire was created by Alan Lyddiard with his ensemble and a community theatre group based at the theatre. Lyddiard was subsequently invited to do a Copenhagen-based adaptation of the film using the same model in 2005 at the Betty Nansen Theatre.

Since 2006 he has been working as a freelance writer/director on a number of film and theatre projects.

On 1 November 2010, while Lyddiard was filming Going Somewhere in Cebu, Philippines, one of the actors was killed in a freak accident. Kirk Abella was shot by a security guard when sitting on the back of a motorcycle. Abella was threatening another actor with a toy gun he was carrying; a village watchman, who claimed he was not aware that he was on a movie set, assumed the gun was real and shot and killed Abella. Some spectators reportedly believed that this was part of the script.

He has recently returned to concentrate on community arts programmes. He has been involved in Community Arts since his time at Dundee Rep, where he was responsible for the development of a community arts programme that began a regeneration project across the city of Dundee. One of his greatest successes was the community production Witch's Blood in 1987 which used the city as the stage transporting an audience of 1000 people in double decker buses across the city from hilltop to river estuary to see scenes performed with a cast of over 500 performers. Witch's Blood is still remembered as a seminal point in the city's cultural history.

He is currently the Artistic Director of The Performance Ensemble, a company of performers over the age of 60 working in the space between community, amateur and professional arts practice

He developed a new performance piece 'Anniversary' in collaboration with Leeds Playhouse in Leeds in 2016 and 'Contained' for Mind The Gap theatre company.

In 2017 Lyddiard toured across Asia making work in Guangzhou, Hong Kong and Singapore. He is now based in Leeds working on a large scale project for Leeds 2023.
