= Train of Thought (Community Arts Tour) =

Canadian travelling arts project

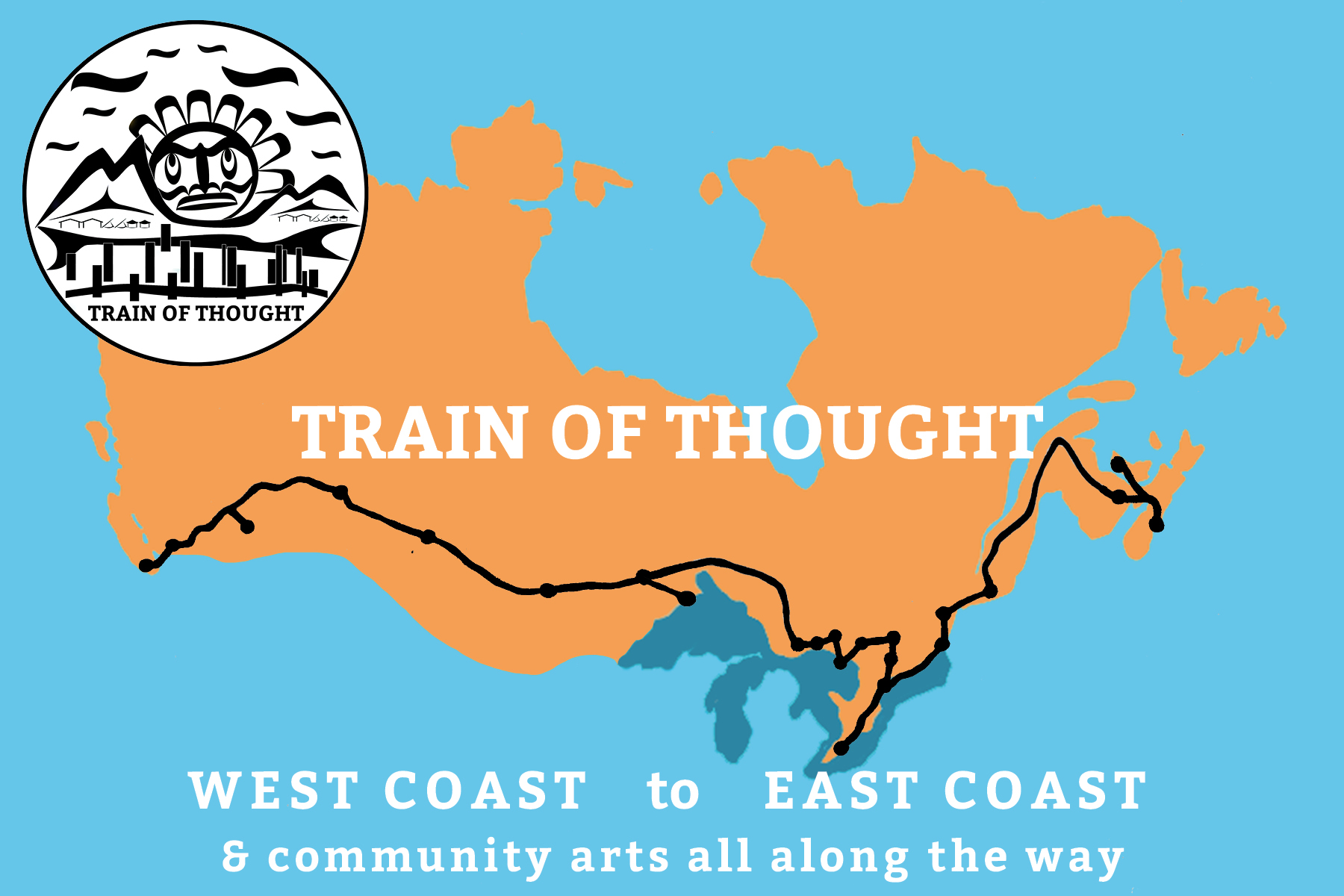
- Founded: 2015
- Founder: Jumblies Theatre
- Type: Community Arts Tour
- Location: Canada
- Website: trainofthought.co

Train of Thought is an evolving Canadian community arts journey from west to east coast, with on-board activities and over 20 stops along the way. Train of Thought is produced by Toronto's Jumblies Theatre with partners all across Canada and will be taking place May and June 2015.

== History ==
Train of Thought was hatched by a group of artists sharing community engagement practices and projects across the country. Its focus is collaborations and alliances between First Nations and settler/immigrant artists and communities.

== Themes ==
Jumblies Theatre and partners developed the project Train of Thought with a focus on collaborations between First Nations and settler/immigrant artists and communities. The project explores regional and cultural perspectives on land and history. Train of Thought involves the collection and sharing of stories, histories, and landscapes. This process brings together artists, community members, indigenous peoples, and subsequent immigrant populations.

== Production ==
Train of Thought is an evolving community arts journey from west to east coast, with on-board activities and over stops along the way. At each stop, a travelling company will get off until the next train comes through. Local arts organizations will host interactive events, and add to creative tasks. Additional travellers will hop aboard to join in conversations and art-making en route.

== Purpose ==
Train of Thought is less about trains than the connections and discoveries enabled by the trip itself. The tour is an imperfect and incomplete adventure, part of a longer, never-ending need to learn, connect, and help change tracks.

== Route ==
British Columbia

- Victoria partnered with From the Heart
- Vancouver partnered with Vancouver Moving Theatre, Vancouver Park Board, Round House Community Centre
- Enderby partnered with Runaway Moon Theatre

Prairie Provinces

- Edmonton, Alberta partnered with Rising Sun Theatre Society, Ground Zero Productions, and the Edmonton Community Arts Network
- Saskatoon, Saskatchewan partnered with Common Weal Community Arts
- Winnipeg, Manitoba partnered with ACI Manitoba and Urban Indigenous Theatre Co.

Ontario

- Sioux Lookout partnered with Municipality of Sioux Lookout
- Kenora partnered with Kenora Association for Community Living and the Community Arts Hub
- Thunder Bay partnered with CAHEP
- North Bay partnered with White Water Gallery and Aanmitaagzi Storymakers
- Manitoulin Island partnered with Debajehmujig Storytellers
- Blind River partnered with Thinking Rock Community Arts and AlgomaTrad
- Sudbury partnered with Myths and Mirrors
- Toronto partnered with Arts4All, MABELLEarts, Making Room, Community Arts Guild, Red Dress Productions, The Mississauga Arts Council, CityPlace Railway Lands Resident Group, and The Amy Project
- Windsor/Brantford partnered with Arts Council Windsor and Region
- Kingston partnered with Stage and Screen Studies (Queen's University)
- Ottawa/Killaloe partnered with Ottawa Valley Creative Arts Open Studio, Carlington Art Initiative, and Canada's Magnetic North Festival

Quebec

- Montreal partnered with Contactivity Senior Centre, NDG Senior Citizen's Council, Concordia Theatre and Development, RECCA, Art Hives/ Ruches D'Art

Maritime Provinces

- Halifax, Nova Scotia partnered with Halifax Circus School, 4 C's Foundation, and Wonder'neath
- Ship Harbour, Nova Scotia partnered with The Deanery Project
- Rock Barra, Prince Edward Island partnered with Rock Barra Retreat
