= Cheryl Capezzuti =

Amnerican artist

Cheryl Capezzuti (born 1969) is an American artist from Pittsburgh, Pennsylvania, who specializes in giant puppets and sculptures made from dryer lint.

== Early life and education ==
Capezzuti grew up in Allison Park, Pennsylvania and attended Hampton High School. She originally studied architecture at Penn State University, but switched majors to integrative arts. She also earned a masters in art education at Penn State.

== Career and art work ==
Capezzuti is best known for her giant puppets and sculptures made from dryer lint.

=== Giant puppets ===
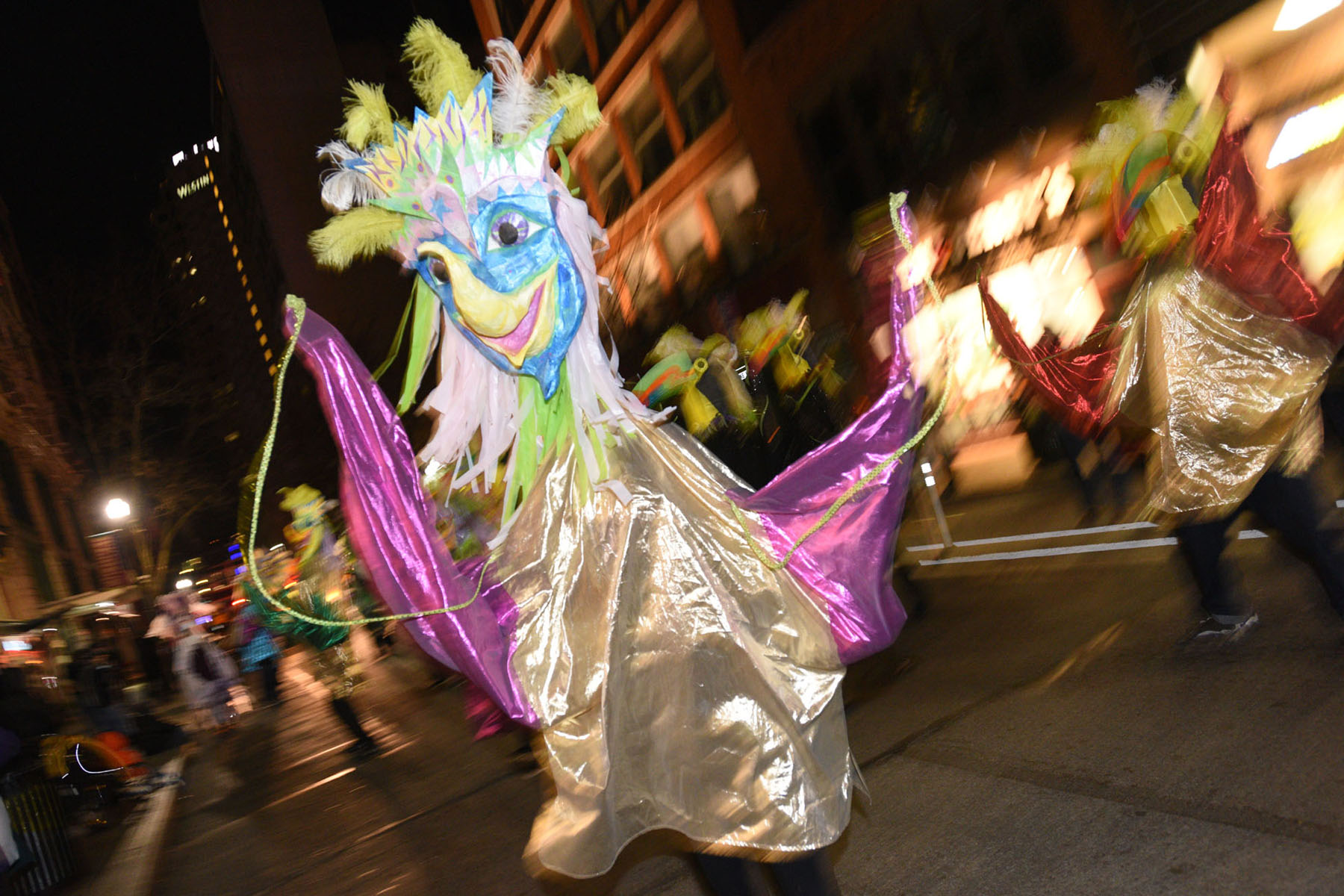
Giant Blue Bird Puppet by Cheryl Capezzuti

After graduation, Capezzuti was an assistant from puppeteer Sara Peattie of Boston, Massachusetts. After returning to Pittsburgh in 1996 she made a giant puppet for the Pittsburgh First Night parade in 1998.

During the COVID-19 pandemic of 2021, she formed a "Giant Puppet Dance Club" on YouTube. Puppets were sanitized and sent to people. The people then danced in them in their yards so other people passing by could see them. They also recorded themselves dancing in them and uploaded the videos to YouTube.

=== Dryer lint sculptures ===
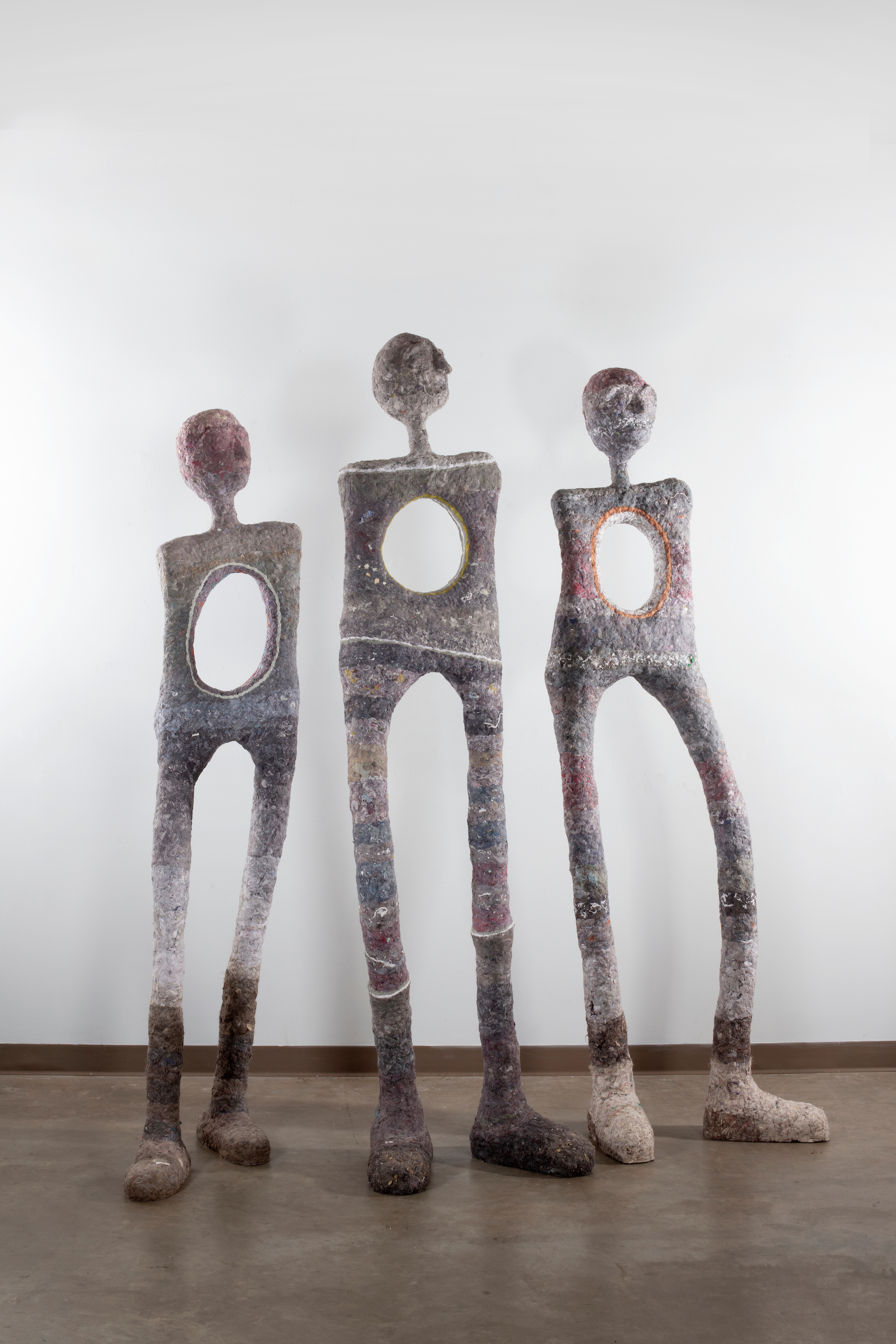
Bipedal, Heroic Trio dryer lint sculpture by Cheryl Capezzuti

Capezzuti began exploring dryer lint as a medium in 1994. Between 2001 and 2004, she ran a community art project that came to be called the "National Lint Project". In the National Lint Project, she invited people from around the US to send her their dryer lint. Many also sent in notes about the objects of special importance they washed that produced the lint (e.g., a favorite baby blanket). Capezzuti then would form art objects from the lint, make a record of the objects, and then return the objects to the original lint donor.

In 2004, she had an ongoing community arts project at the "Dud's 'N' Suds" in the Shadyside section of Pittsburgh. In this project, she sculpted tiny angels and people from people's dryer lint. Her lint work also includes giant people.

Very often there is a story behind the lint used in a particular sculpture. Two large sculptures "Angel of Immunity" and "Angel of Shared Strength", for example, were made from sterile lint from a hospital laundry.

Capezzuti is currently a master teacher at the University of Pittsburgh's Falk Laboratory School

== Personal life ==
Capezzuti is married with two children.
