= Welfare State International =

British experimental theatre group

Welfare State International was a British experimental theatre group formed in 1968 by John Fox and Sue Gill, Roger Coleman and others. It became "A collective of radical artists and thinkers who explored ideas of celebratory art and spectacle between 1968 and 2006."

== Background ==
The company's name was originally 'The Welfare State', based on the concept of offering art for all on the same basis as education and health.

Welfare State International was initially known for staging large-scale outdoor spectacular events. At this time (the late 1960s), forsaking theatres and galleries for the street was unusual for arts companies.

In November 2001, Welfare State International was described by the Guardian Guide as "Britain's foremost arts and installations collective." Welfare State International's 'The Raising of the Titanic' (Limehouse Basin, London, 1983) has been listed among "Productions that transformed theatre".

Welfare State International ceased operating on April Fools' Day 2006 after a performance at Ulverston.

== Dead Good Guides ==
Gill and Fox have transitioned their work into the artist-led organisation 'Dead Good Guides', which seeks, for art, a role "that weaves it more fully into the fabric of our lives." As part of this practice, they have published multiple guides on creative and artist-led rites and rituals for daily life. Sue Gill and Gilly Adams founded and continue to lead Rites of Passage retreats and workshops, which enable artists to train as celebrants.

== Related Publications ==
- Engineers of the Imagination (1983, 1990), eds. Tony Coult and Baz Kershaw ISBN 9780413528001.
- The Dead Good Funeral Books (1996), Sue Gill and John Fox ISBN 9780952715900.
- The Dead Good Book of Namings and Baby Welcoming Ceremonies (1999), ed. Jonathan Howe w/ Sue Gill and John Fox ISBN 0952715929.
- In All My Born Days (2021), Sue Gill ISBN 9780956858375.

== See also ==
=== Techniques ===
- Community theatre
- Experimental theatre
- Mask
- Medieval pageant
- Street theatre

=== Related companies ===
- Horse and Bamboo Theatre
- Kneehigh Theatre
- Shadowland Theatre

=== Former members ===
- TJ Eckleberg
