= Northern Stage, Newcastle upon Tyne =

Theatre company in Newcastle upon Tyne, England

Northern Stage
- Newcastle Playhouse; Gulbenkian Studio
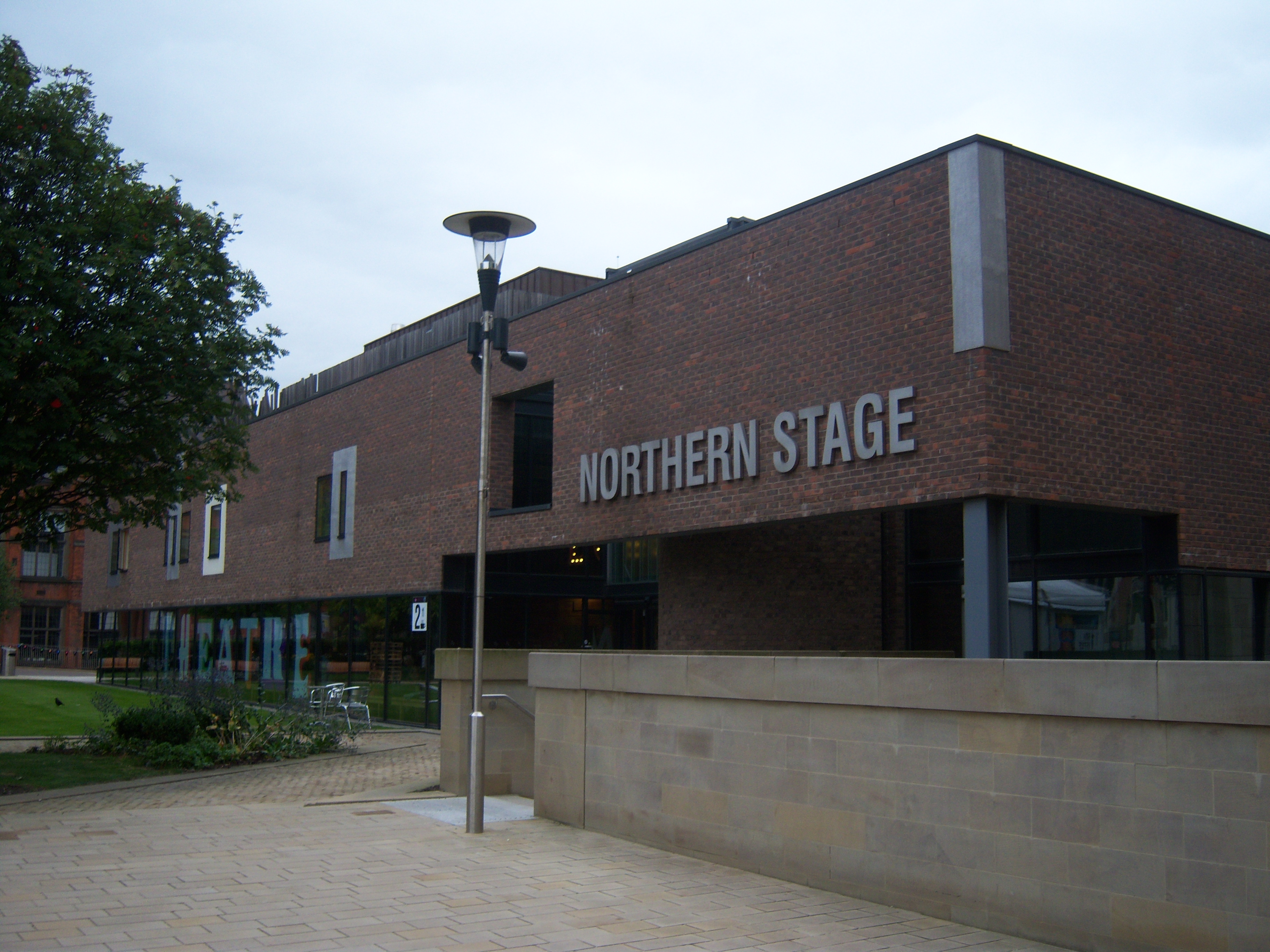
- Northern Stage Building, viewed from Kings Gate Building
- Interactive map of Northern Stage
- Address: Barras Bridge; Newcastle upon Tyne; UK
- Coordinates: 54°58′45″N 1°36′51″W
- Capacity: Stage 1: 447 seats Stage 2: 160 seats Stage 3: 80–120 seats Stage 1 and 2 can combine to seat 600.

Construction
- Opened: 1970; 2006 as Northern Stage
- Rebuilt: 2004 to 2006
- Architect: William Whitfield

Website
- www.northernstage.co.uk

Northern Stage is a theatre and producing theatre company based in Newcastle upon Tyne. It is surrounded by Newcastle University's city centre campus on King's Walk, opposite the students' union building. It hosts various local, national and international productions in addition to those produced by the Northern Stage company. Until the 2006 reopening, the theatre was known as the Newcastle Playhouse and is a registered charity.

The complex hosts three stages. The capacity decreases, with stage one being the largest, having 447 seats. The complex also boasts a café-bar.

== History ==
=== Early history ===
The building opened as the University Theatre in 1970 and provided a new home for the Tyneside Theatre Company. The company had been established in 1968 in the Flora Robson Playhouse in Jesmond, which was set to be demolished in a road-widening scheme. The architect Sir William Whitfield designed the building as a flexible performance space which also included three bars, two of them opening onto the auditorium. The new building also housed the Gulbenkian Studio.

The building was renamed the Newcastle Playhouse in 1978 after the Tyneside Theatre Company was dissolved and replaced with the Tyne and Wear Theatre Company. In 1987 this became the Tyne Theatre Company and moved out of the Playhouse to the Tyne Theatre and Opera House before another move in 1989 saw its name change to Northern Stage. The company moved back into the Playhouse in 1992, also taking over the running of the Gulbenkian Studio. From 1992 until 2005 the company was run by Alan Lyddiard who created the Northern Stage Ensemble Company in 1998.

=== Recent history ===
It re-opened in August 2006 as Northern Stage after a £9 million refurbishment. The first performance at the refurbished theatre was a production of Dennis Potter's Son of Man. During the 2006 refurbishment an art installation was constructed on the roof of the theatre, titled Escapology, by artist Cath Campbell.

On 7 April 2008 the Barras Bridge car park was permanently closed for the development of the university's new King's Gate Building.

== Productions ==
Northern Stage both presents visiting national and international theatre and produces its own productions. On reopening in 2007 productions included the first-ever revival of Our Friends in the North, Lipsynch (a co-production with Robert Lepage), the first major UK adaptation of Angela Carter's The Bloody Chamber and updated versions of Henrik Ibsen's A Doll's House and John Osborne's Look Back in Anger. More recently, productions have included Hedda Gabler and Dr. Frankenstein, both in co-production with Newcastle-based theatre company Greyscale.
