= Laurel Frank =

Australian costume designer

Laurel Frank is an Australian costume designer who has designed for physical theatre, parades and events.

== Early life ==
Laurel Christine Frank grew up in Melbourne, Victoria. Her mother was a dressmaker and she pursued the same line of work. Laurel studied at RMIT and took her BA at La Trobe University in the 1960s, sharing houses with performers from the Pram Factory Theatre in Carlton. She worked as a sound technician and stage manager.

== Costume design ==
Frank was a member of the Australian Performing Group in Melbourne from 1973-1980. In 1978 she joined the new company Circus Oz, and continues as one of their longest serving members and designers. She learnt chorus work, acrobatics and clowning but instead became its chief costume designer and wardrobe mistress, adapting the costumes to suit the physicality required of the performers.

She has also designed and made costumes for other circus companies and solo performers. These include the Flying Fruit Fly Circus and the National Institute of Circus Arts. She has designed costumes for parades and events, including costumes for the Moomba parade in Melbourne. She designed many costumes for the Light Fantastic Parade and Lunchtime Parades at World Expo 88 in Brisbane. She has designed and produced costumes for children’s television series including L’il Horrors.

Her work has been displayed in the Performing Arts Museum in Melbourne. She has also produced historic costumes for the National Museum in Canberra, Immigration Museum of Melbourne, State Museum in Carlton, Jewish Museum in Sydney, Powerhouse Museum in Sydney and the Bendigo and Ballarat Regional Museum. The University of Queensland Fryer Library holds sketches and photographs of Frank's work for World Expo 88.

== Awards ==
Lifetime Achievement Award, Green Room Awards 2016
