= Circus Oz =

Australian circus troupe

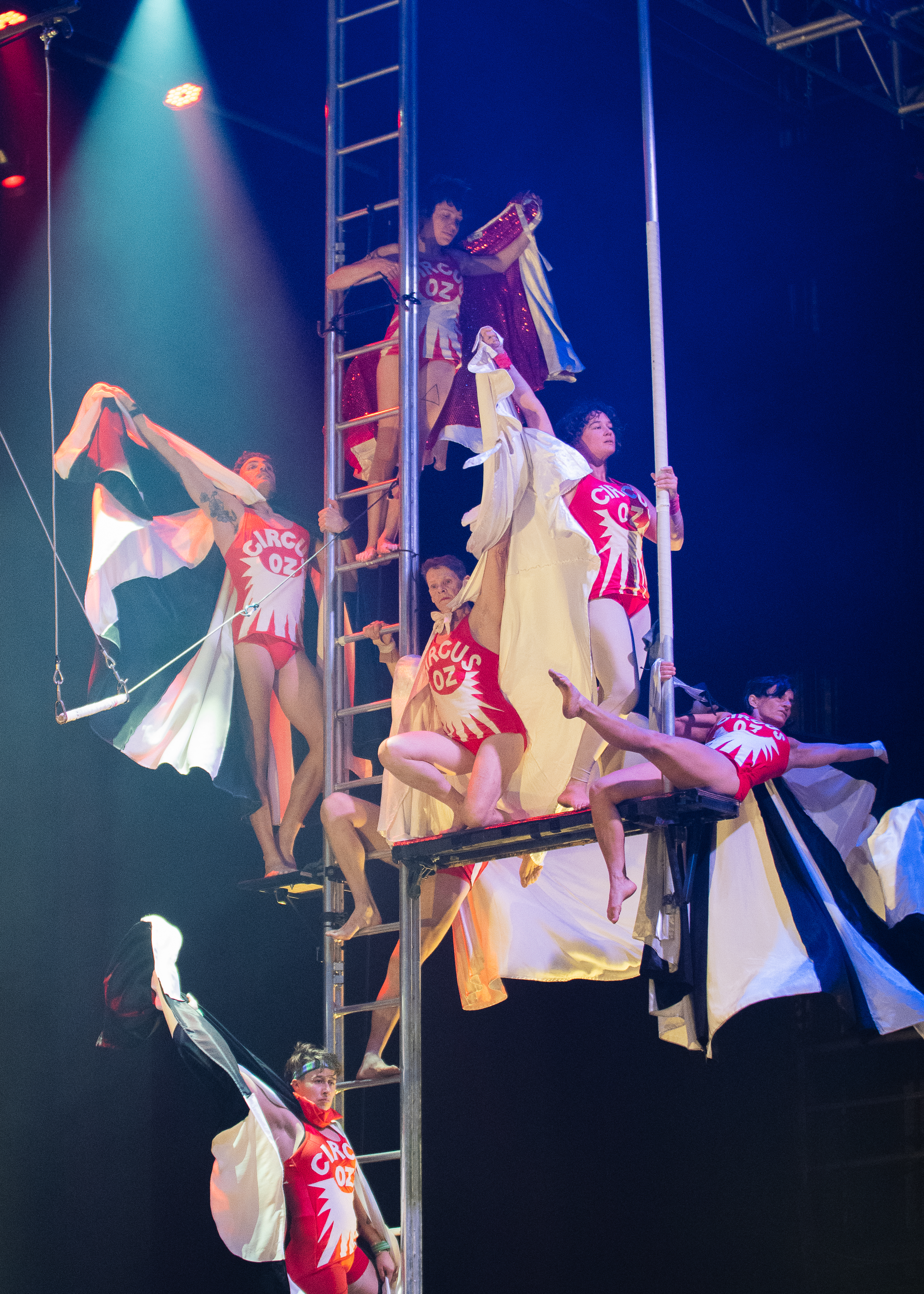
Circus Oz performing in 2023

Circus Oz is a contemporary circus company based in Australia, collectively owned by its Membership, founded in 1978. Its shows incorporate circus, theatre, satire, rock 'n' roll and a uniquely Australian humour.

== History ==
=== Early years ===
Circus Oz received the Certificate of Incorporation of Public Company on 9 February 1978 in Melbourne. It was funded by the Australian Performing Group (APG), and had its first performance season in March 1978. Circus Oz was the amalgamation of two already well-known groups: the New Ensemble Circus (a continuation of the New Circus, established in Adelaide in 1973); and the Soapbox Circus, a roadshow set up by the APG in 1976.

The founding members were: Sue Broadway, Tony Burkys, Tim Coldwell, John "Jack" Daniel, Laurel Frank, Kelvin Gedye, Jon Hawkes, Ponch Hawkes, Robin Laurie, John Pinder, Michael Price, Alan Robertson, Jim Robertson, Pixie Roberstson, Helen Sky, Jim Conway, Mic Conway, Rick Ludbrook, Peter Mulheisen, Gordon McLean, Steve Cooney, and Colin Stevens. Laurie and Broadway, along with members Jane Mullett, Celeste Howden, Laurel Frank, Hellen Sky, and Ollie Black, formed a one-off group called the Mighty Bonza Whacko Women's Circus. This led to the establishment of the Wimmins Circus in 1979. Wimmins Circus was based at the APG's Pram Factory, and was able to use the Circus Oz gym.

Significant developments in Circus Oz's early years included: a 32-week season in 1979 at the Last Laugh Theatre Restaurant in Melbourne; the company's first international tour in 1980 (including London's Roundhouse, Belgium and New Guinea); the "Nanjing Project" (Chinese acrobatic master classes); and the group's relations with The Flying Fruit Fly Circus. As part of its international touring, Circus Oz has been to many cities all over the world, including New York City, London, and Jerusalem.

Originally founded as a collective governed company, Circus Oz developed into a triumvirate by the late 1990s by having a Triple Executive who all equally ran and organised the company. The Triple Executive included Co-CEO Linda Mickleborough, who became general manager of Circus Oz in 1993. During her time at the helm she was responsible for the development of Circus Oz Classes, High Flying Teams, and Indigenous programs, and laid the preparations for a move to new premises at Collingwood. She resigned effective from 31 December 2012. The Executive team also included Co-CEO Mike Finch who was artistic director (1997-2015), and founding member Tim Coldwell. The company is owned by the Company Membership (the stakeholders) and is governed by a Board of Directors. Chairs of the Board have included: Trish Caswell; Vic Marles; and Wendy McCarthy.

== The company ==
=== Values ===
The founders wanted to create a "contemporary circus" (words used in their show programme "history" as early as 1980), with elements of rock'n'roll, popular theatre and satire. The company had an ongoing social justice agenda and was open about supporting humanitarian causes. Over the years this has included women's rights, land rights for First Nations Australians and strong opposition to the indefinite detention of asylum seekers.

=== Shows ===
One of the first "new" or "contemporary" circuses without animals (it predates Cirque du Soleil by several years), Circus Oz made shows with only 12 multi-skilled performers who all performed the entire show, doing "a bit of everything", from acrobatics and clowning to music and aerial work. The shows were usually comic and character-driven. The cast comprised a diverse mix of body shapes and ages, with an equal number of men and women. Their style was generally cheeky, anarchic and subversive.

Circus Oz performed in at least 27 countries across five continents, including four seasons on 42nd Street in New York City, a number of seasons at Queen Elizabeth and Royal Festival Halls in London, a refugee camp in the West Bank, Indigenous communities in the Australian desert and a glass opera house in the Brazilian rainforest. Shows were translated and performed in many languages, including Hindi, Catalan and Danish. The troupe broke box office records at the Edinburgh Fringe Festival and represented Australia at many international festivals.

With the exception of Waiter, There's a Circus in My Soup (1979), Circus Oz did not name their seasons or tours until 2006, with the Laughing at Gravity tour. Each subsequent tour was then named until 2017 when Artistic Director, Rob Tannion (AD from 2016-2019), developed the company into a multi-show model.

- Laughing at Gravity (2006)
- Barely Contained (2009-2010)
- See It To Believe It (2010)
- Steampowered (2011-2012)
- From the Ground Up (2012)
- Cranked Up (2013)
- But Wait...There's More (2014-2016)
- Twentysixteen (2016)
- Model Citizens (2017)
- Precarious (2018-2019)
- Rock Bang (2018-2019)
- Wunderage (2019)
- Non-Stop Energy (2023)
- Smash It! (2024)
- HAVOC (2024)

=== Ensemble ===
Until 2017, the company employed a full-time ensemble of 12 performers (an equal number of men and women), plus a technical crew, production and artistic departments. Apart from touring nationally and internationally with their various shows, other parts of Circus Oz included:

- BLAKFlip, a programme connecting Australian Aboriginal performers and artists with the circus, including masterclasses, casting, performances, traineeships and guest artists;
- Circus Classes, public circus classes for the general public, adults, schools, and community groups to learn circus skills;
- The Melba Spiegeltent, a venue with a programme of cabaret, innovative performance, and local community events;
- SideSault, a Sector Support Programme, providing access to space for a selected series of small/medium-sized local performance groups (primarily using a circus vocabulary);
- High Flying Teams, a corporate team-building and training programme using circus as a skill-base for corporate training

== Notable events ==
=== "New" premises ===
In late 2013 Circus Oz relocated to a new custom-fitted home base in Collingwood, an inner suburb of Melbourne. The Victorian Government owns the facility, but was re-designed specifically to Circus Oz's requirements. This location includes a permanent Spiegeltent, large rehearsal spaces, outdoor areas, and workshop and props-making facilities. The buildings are approximately half of an abandoned college campus, the remainder of which was converted by Arts Victoria into a multi-arts and community precinct known as Collingwood Yards, which opened in March 2021.

=== The closure that never came ===
In December 2021, it was announced by the Board and CEO at the time that a decision had been taken to close the company, (Note: This appears to have been an erroneous and unexpected announcement, as it has not closed, but more cited detail needs to be added to the article.) after its main funding body the Australia Council had given the choice of reforming its structure or losing its funding. The proposal involved recreating its board and membership with a reduced proportion of artists and former employees (a move that would be fundamentally against the company's ethos). The results of an anonymous online poll showed that 62 out of 81 votes chose to reject the new model. During 2021, the company had been the subject of an independent review, commissioned jointly by Creative Victoria and the Australia Council, which had concluded that "systemic issues [were] holding back the company", and recommended that membership criteria be broadened that the board should be made up entirely of members based on their skills and qualifications. Company members were shocked by the sudden announcement. As of January 2022, their website announced a change of use for the Circus Oz venue. At an Extraordinary General Meeting held on Wednesday 16 February 2022, the members voted unanimously to continue the operations of the company regardless of the implications for funding, and accept the resignations of the then Board members.

== See also ==
- The Pram Factory
- Australian Performing Group
- The Captain Matchbox Whoopee Band
- Ashton's circus
- List of circuses and circus owners
