= Celeste Miller =

American choreographer, dancer

- Occupations: choreographer; solo performer; educator; community arts animator

Celeste Miller is a choreographer, solo performer, educator, and community arts animator, located in the United States.

== Career ==
Miller is the Institute Director of the Curriculum in Motion Institute, co-founder of Jacob's Pillow Curriculum in Motion, and Lead Artist of Jacob's Pillow Medicine in Motion. She has authored a description of the Curriculum in Motion approach, titled 'Dancing with our Textbooks on our Heads', in the book Hybrid Lives of Teaching Artists in Dance and Theatre Arts: A Critical Reader (Cambria Press). She has also been a facilitator at the Alabama Dance Council. She is currently an associate professor in the department of Theatre, Dance, and Performance Studies at Grinnell College, where she is the artistic director of the Grinnell College Dance Ensemble/ACTivate. Miller earned her MFA from Hollins University/American Dance Festival.

Her choreographic piece titled 'Vision On 66: Go Dad Go' was performed in Tampa and St. Petersburg, as well as L.A. Her piece 'At Water’s Edge/Al filo de agua', directed in conjunction with Dora Arreola and featuring dancer Miroslava Wilson, vocalist Siki Carpio, and violinist/composer Chip Epsten, was performed at the Museum of Fine Arts in St. Petersburg, Florida in June 2022.

== Awards ==
Miller has received a National Endowment for the Arts Choreography Fellowship and the Atlanta Mayor's Fellowship in the Arts.
