= Ruth Howard (artist) =

Canadian artist

Ruth Howard is a Canadian artist who creates arts and theatre projects with communities and has been called "a key figure in the Canadian Community Play movement". She was the founding Artistic Director of Jumblies Theatre, from 2001 to 2022.

== Early life and education ==
Ruth Howard was born in Durham England on April 29, 1957, to mother Antonie Howard (née Eber) and father Ian P. Howard, a renowned researcher in visual perception. She has younger twin brothers, Neil and Martin. In 1966, the family moved to Manhattan for a year and then to Toronto, Canada, which has remained Ruth's home-base ever since, although she has also lived and worked in many other places. She currently lives on Wards Island with her partner of many years, Stephen Cooper. They have three children: Shifra, Helah and Eli.

Ruth studied at the Eastbourne College of Art and Design, at the University of Toronto where she obtained a BA Honours in English Literature and Drama, and at the National Theatre School of Canada (Design Program).

== Early work ==
Ruth worked for many years as a theatre designer, at professional theatres across Canada, as well as with various forms of popular and participatory arts and theatre.

In 1991, Ruth was invited by Dale Hamilton to be a designer for the Spirit of Shivaree in Rockwood, Ontario, a project inspired by the British work of the Colway Theatre Trust with director Jon Oram. This introduction to the community play form, which combines high-calibre art making on an epic scale with a practice of wholehearted social inclusion and an astonishing capacity for social change, has inspired the course and nature of her work ever since.

Ruth went on to design community plays in Canada and the U.K. - in Blyth, Ontario; Fort Qu'Appelle, Saskatchewan; Enderby, British Columbia; Torquay, England and Manchester, England - and to create interdisciplinary projects that adapted the form to reflect her evolving artistic interests and urban realities. She produced and create her own theatre events: initially in school communities, and growing in size and complexity. In 2000, she produced a multi-lingual performance piece in South Riverdale’s Twisted Metal and Mermaids Tears, the success of which prompted her to found Jumblies Theatre in 2001.

== Jumblies Theatre ==
Ruth founded Jumblies Theatre in 2001 to support what had evolved as an approach of establishing multi-year residencies in urban neighbourhoods leading to large-scale, participatory, performance works and lasting local legacies. These pieces were adapted from and retained many of the guiding principles of the Community Play model.

Jumblies has since undertaken residencies in a series of communities, leading to highly acclaimed productions, including "Once A Shoreline"in Davenport West (2004); "Bridge of One Hair" in Central Etobicoke (2007); "Oy Di Velt Vet Vern Yinger (Oh the world will grow younger)" at Camp Naivelt (2008) and the Mayworks Festival (2009); "Like An Old Tale", a Scarborough telling of Shakespeare's The Winter's Tale (2011).

Ruth has mentored and supported many artists, projects and organizations. Jumblies' residencies resulted in a series of independent "Offshoot" organizations: Arts4All in Davenport West, MABELLEarts in Etobicoke, the Community Arts Guild in Scarborough, and an "adopted" Offshoot: Making Room in Parkdale. Other thriving community arts organizations outside of Toronto mentored by Ruth include Aanmitaagzi, Thinking Rock and OV-CAOS. In 2016, Ruth initiated into the Jumblies Studio, a strand of the company dedicated to learning and mentorship in community-engaged arts, including workshops, courses, internships, mentorship, resources and special projects and partnerships.

In 2014, Jumblies moved to a downtown Toronto Location (The Ground Floor). From here, Ruth and Jumblies undertook a multi-year exploration of Toronto's layered, Indigenous and colonial histories, leading to the 2017 "Touching Ground Festival" of new works, two national tours ("Train of Thought" and "Four Lands"), and "Talking Treaties", a project led by Associate Artistic Director, Ange Loft, including a spectacular performance at Toronto's Historic Fort York (2017 and 2018), and an interactive installation at the Inaugural Toronto Biennial of Art (2019), two films and an educational website (talkingtreaties.ca). Ruth and Jumblies have also produced two Canadian Tours: Train of Thought (2015) and Four Lands (2016 to 18).

Ruth has created and produced many other projects with and outside of Jumblies Theatre, including:

- a one-year residency at Lawrence Heights, ending with an outdoor production called "I’m Tapingi Too!" (2001);
- "the Toronto Seder", an adapted secular Passover Seder telling an urgent story of Toronto's Indigenous history (2014);
- "Being Margolia", a choral work commissioned and performed by the Toronto Children's Chorus, composed by Martin van de Ven, libretto by Ruth Howard, based on the Camp Naivelt Jewish commune re-enactment project (2010);
- Other newly commissioned musical works, including "Under The Concrete" (Composed by Martin van de Ven and Rosary Spence), "Voices Dangle Like Bells" and "Quarry" (composed respectively by Jason Doell and Juliet Palmer, in partnership with Continuum),"Round the Table" (with 7 composers - rounds to accompany a meal), "Endings" (composed by Lieke van de Voort), and "Odaabaanag" (composed by Melody and Beverley McKiver, in partnership with Soundstreams);
- "Grounds For Goodness", an interdisciplinary exploration of 'social goodness' (2019-2022).

In 2022, Ruth stepped aside her artistic director role with Jumblies, making room for new leadership (Artistic Director Sharada Eswar) and continuing to work as a consultant, mentor and independent artist.

== Publications ==
- Easy to Say: Reflections on the roles of art and the artist in Canadian adaptations of the Colway Community Play form funded by Canada Council for the Arts, Co-written with Rachael Van Fossen, Jan 2005
- Produced short video on Once A Shoreline process as part of Documenting Engagement Vancouver, Jan. 2004
- The Cultural Equivalent of Daycare? , funded by In Print Dialogue, Community Arts Ontario, 2004
- The Aesthetics of Including Everyone Alt Theatre, Fall 2002.
- Holding On and Letting Go: Designing the Community Play Canadian Theatre Review, spring 1997
- "Is Anyone Political Any More?", Canadian Theatre Review, Edited by Kim Renders, Julie Salverson and Jenn Stephenson, Fall 2011.
- "Out of the Tunnel There Came Tea", Chapter in VIVA! Community Arts and Popular Education in the Americas, SUNY Press and Between the Lines, edited by Deb Barndt, 2011
- "Placemats for September 11th", Critical Perspectives on Canadian Theatre in English, Vol.17: Political Popular Theatre, Ruth Howard, Ed. Julie Salverson, General Editor Ric Knowles, Playwrights Canada Press, 2010.

== Professional affiliations ==
- Associated Designers of Canada (board member, 1990 to 1993)
- Common Weal (founding board member, 1992 to 1994)
- Jumblies Theatre (founder and artistic director, 2001 to present)
- Community Arts Ontario (board member, 2003 to 2005)
- Shadowland Theatre (board member, 2005 to present)
- Advisory council member for York University’s Community Art Program (2005 to present)
- Consultant for AGO Arts Access/ Collection X Project (2005 to present)
- Toronto Arts Council (board member and chair of Community Arts Committee, 2009 to 2014)
- FixtPoint (board member, 2012 to 2019)
- Aanmitaagzi (board member, 2019 to present)
- Theatre Direct (board member, 2021 to present)

== Awards ==
- 2000 Our Millennium Award for South Riverdale Lives and Legends
- 2000 South Riverdale CHC, Citizen of the Year (Ruth Howard)
- 2002 Community Arts Ontario, Best Practices for "More or the Magic Fish"
- 2004 Toronto Urban Institute, Urban Leadership Award Nomination
- 2005 Toronto Community Foundation, Vital People Award
- 2005 Fresh Ground Commission, Harbourfront Centre, Toronto (Jumblies Theatre)
- 2007 Great Grants Award, Ontario Trillium Foundation (Jumblies Theatre)
- 2007 nominated for a Dora Mavor Moore Award for Outstanding Costume Design for Bridge of One Hair
- 2008 Toronto Community Foundation, Vital Ideas Grant (Jumblies Theatre)
- 2012 Ontario Trillium Foundation Provincial Great Grants Award (Jumblies Theatre)
- 2012 Canadian Urban Institute City Soul, Urban Leadership Award
- 2012 TAPA George Luscombe Award for Mentorship in Theatre
- 2015 Shortlisted for the TAF Martha Bindhardt and Rita Davies Cultural Leadership Award
- 2018 Toronto Arts Foundation Award for Celebration of Cultural Life
