= Community art =

Art genre based in a community setting

Community art, also known as social art, community-engaged art, community-based art, and, rarely, dialogical art, is the practice of art based in—and generated in—a community setting. It is closely related to social practice and social turn. Works in this form can be of any media and are characterized by interaction or dialogue with the community. Professional artists may collaborate with communities which may not normally engage in the arts. The term was defined in the late 1960s as the practice grew in the United States, Canada, the Netherlands, the United Kingdom, Ireland, and Australia. In Scandinavia, the term "community art" more often refers to contemporary art projects.

Community art is a community-oriented, grassroots approach, often useful in economically depressed areas. When local community members come together to express concerns or issues through this artistic practice, professional artists or actors may be involved. This artistic practice can act as a catalyst to trigger events or changes within a community or at a national or international level. A recent example is that of the Brooklyn Immersionists who created dynamic events in the streets, rooftops and abandoned warehouses along Brooklyn’s industrial waterfront in the 1990s. The emergence of creative networks helped to bring local businesses back to the area and lowered the rate of attrition for the disadvantaged in that economically struggling district. The attrition rates reversed when the City of New York privileged corporate developers in the new millennium.

In English-speaking countries, community art is often seen as the work of community arts centers, where visual arts (fine art, video, new media art), music, and theater are common media. Many arts organizations in the United Kingdom do community-based work, which typically involves developing participation by non-professional members of local communities.

== Public art ==
The term "community art" may also apply to public art efforts when, in addition to the collaborative community artistic process, the resulting product is intended as public art and installed in public space. Popular community art approaches to public art can include environmental sustainability themes associated with urban revitalization projects.

== Forms of collaborative practices ==
Models of community-engaged arts can vary with three forms of collaborative practices emerging from among the sets of common practices. In the artist-driven model, artists are seen as the catalysts for social change through the social commentary addressed in their works. A muralist whose work elicits and sustains political dialogue would be a practitioner of this model. In the second model, artists engage with community groups to facilitate specialized forms of art creation, often with the goal of presenting the work in a public forum to promote awareness and to further discourse within a larger community. In the process-driven or dialogic model, artists may engage with a group to facilitate an artistic process that addresses particular concerns specific to the group. The use of an artistic process (such as dance or social circus) for problem-solving, therapeutic, group-empowerment or strategic planning purposes may result in artistic works that are not intended for public presentation. In the second and third models, the individuals who collaborate on the artistic creation may not define themselves as artists but are considered practitioners of an art-making process that produces social change.

Due to its roots in social justice and collaborative, community-based nature, art for social change may be considered a form of cultural democracy. Often, the processes (or the works produced by these processes) intend to create or promote spaces for participatory public dialogue.

In Canada, the field of community-engaged arts has recently seen broader use of art for social change practices by non-arts change organizations. The resultant partnerships have enabled these collaborative communities to address systemic issues in health, education, as well as empowerment for indigenous, immigrant, LGBT and youth communities. A similar social innovation trend has appeared where business development associations have engaged with artists/artistic organizations to co-produce cultural festivals or events that address social concerns.

As the field diversifies and practices are adopted by various organizations from multiple disciplines, ethics and safety have become a concern to practitioners. As a result, opportunities for cross-disciplinary training in art for social change practices have grown within the related field of arts education.

== Online community art ==
A community can be seen in many ways, and it can refer to different kind of groups. There are also virtual communities or online communities. Internet art has many different forms, but often there is some kind of community that is created for a project or it is an effect of an art project. One example of community art is the so-called image worm, whereby artists on a forum will build upon a canvas and smoothly transition in their own piece between the last piece using image stitching, and then the next artist will build up on it, and so on. Such pieces will eventually take on the form of a panorama, stretching on as infinitely as the community decides to continue building upon the piece.

== Community theatre ==
Community theatre includes theatre made by, with, and for a community—it may refer to theatre that is made almost by a community with no outside help, or to a collaboration between community members and professional theatre artists, or to performance made entirely by professionals that is addressed to a particular community. Community theatres range in size from small groups led by single individuals that perform in borrowed spaces to large permanent companies with well-equipped facilities of their own. Many community theatres are successful, non-profit businesses with a large active membership and, often, a full-time professional staff. Community theatre is often devised and may draw on popular theatrical forms, such as carnival, circus, and parades, as well as performance modes from commercial theatre. Community theatre is understood to contribute to the social capital of a community, insofar as it develops the skills, community spirit, and artistic sensibilities of those who participate, whether as producers or audience-members.

== Community-engaged dance ==
Community-engaged dance includes dance made by, with, and for a community. There are several models for creating community-engaged dance, primarily concerned with participatory art practices and cooperative values. Community-engaged dance generally focuses on exploration, creation and relationship building rather than technical skills development. Like community theatre, community-engaged dance is understood to contribute to the social capital of a community, insofar as it develops the skills, community spirit, and artistic sensibilities of those who participate, whether as producers or audience-members.

== Benefits ==
Many communities have some form of art institution that furthers their community by providing access to activities and programs the government or other institutions cannot provide. These community-based art centers or nonprofit organizations are at the forefront of bringing emotional and physical wellness to the communities they reside in. All art community nonprofits have different programs, these "programs can focus on building community, increasing awareness...developing creativity, or addressing common issues." Many art institutions provide programs and services like art classes for painting or drawing etc. for all ages. It is vital to the continuation of the organization to keep the love of art alive in younger generations.

Having an art institution or nonprofit can provide that outlet for individuals to create, showcase their artistic talents, and express themselves, and many businesses benefit economically from having nonprofits in their towns. One of the most important aspects of a program offered at an art institution or nonprofit organization is that it provides the participant with a stress free and fun experience. Art is a tool that helps in reducing stress, anxiety, and is helpful to move towards healing. The creative and relaxed environment of these programs may serve as a way for individuals to express themselves without fear of repercussions.

One non-profit organization aimed at helping underprivileged communities and families is "Free Arts for Abused Children" out of Los Angeles. This organization focuses on bringing families together through art, and allowing children and families to express their artistic abilities and feelings in a safe environment.

== Notable artists ==
- Jerri Allyn
- Judith F. Baca
- Joseph Beuys
- Cheryl Capezzuti
- Helen Crummy
- Harrell Fletcher
- Robert Hooks
- Ruth Howard
- Karen Jamieson
- künstlerinnenkollektiv marsie (Simone Etter)
- JR (artist),
- Paul Kuniholm
- Suzanne Lacy
- Alan Lyddiard
- Royston Maldoom
- Celeste Miller
- Adrian Piper
- Mierle Laderman Ukeles

== Community arts center ==
- Self Help Graphics & Art

== See also ==
- Artivism
- Citizen media
- Community media
- Community radio
- Environmental sculpture
- Installation art
- Not-for-profit arts organization
- Participatory art
- Public art
- Site-specific art
- Social center
- Street art
