= Social circus =

Social circus refers to the growing movement toward the use of circus arts as mediums for social justice and social good. It uses alternative pedagogical tools to work with youth who are marginalized or at social or personal risk.

== Purpose ==
Through the dynamic approach of art-based education, the "social circus" seeks to expand the opportunities of and teach valuable skills to marginalized youth. The social circus "recognizes and values the role of art and culture as powerful agents in the education of at-risk youth, producing knowledge, and promoting the interchange of ideas and experiences, impacting (Brazilian) society and the public organizations responsible for youth education."

With rigorous training, interpersonal dialogue and expression, and the acquisition of goals through dedication, the social circus has the ability to alter the lives of at-risk youth. Autonomy, solidarity, self-esteem, physical-fitness, communication, and adaptability are some of the skills learned and practiced.

While a career in the circus is one possible future to the youth who participate in the social circus, it is not the purpose. Rather, the objective is to increase self-awareness, individuality and collective unity, self-discipline and many other values through a pedagogical alternative in order to transform the vision and capabilities of at-risk youth.

== Methodology ==
The social circus owes much of its use and success to its roots in arts education. Artistic expression often allows for the recognition of emotions and their articulation because art is a different language in itself. Art creates a basis for a greater understanding of new experiences, often not attained through a simple translation of verbal concepts which are not tied to the emotions of the individual. With a base in the circus arts, the social circus has the capacity to bring about a personal transformation in the performer and the spectator.

Another characteristic of the social circus is its universality and accessibility. Each person, in accordance with their abilities, is able to realize their own potential through the wide gamut of activities that the circus offers: one can participate in juggling, trapeze, acrobatics, contortionism, clowning, magic, balancing acts, etc. Thus, she who does not have the flexibility required to be a contortionist can find refuge in balancing acts; he who does not have the ability to do trapeze can act and be a clown; someone not interested in the physical activities has an opportunity to work with the set, lighting, or costumes. Furthermore, the social circus lacks barriers to entry: one does not have to know how to read and write in order to participate. Often, the youth have already developed skills in dancing, singing, and percussion– activities which, generally not valorized, take on importance in the social circus. Such inclusive characteristics add to the social circus' success by attracting youth from all backgrounds, ensuring participation and access.

The demands and necessities of the circus arts give rise to personal transformation. Self-discipline is an absolute requisite with the constant practices, daily difficulties, and physical risks that characterize the social circus. Youth learn to push through these challenges, with their own efforts, and in doing so discover that they are capable and valuable beings. The social circus allows for at-risk youth to realize their own potential through the challenges that the circus brings, making them feel accomplished. Upon discovering that they are capable and intelligent beings, they start to deconstruct paradigms that they originally thought to be true. For example, Brazilian youth reevaluate the commonly held beliefs that everyone who lives in the favela is intellectually impaired, that every street child does not have a purpose or future, etc. These beliefs end up becoming a barrier to the self-development of the youth, and circus activities let them break such paradigms.

The structure and characteristics of the circus allow the youth to discuss and engage in free thought, often under the pretext of circus technicalities. Social relationships and generally taboo yet relevant topics are discussed, such as sexuality, gender, inclusion, prejudice, and discrimination. Such debate and discussion expands youth perspective while increasing their confidence, tolerance, and knowledge.

=== The Circle ===
A Roda, or the Circle, is an integral part of the social circus. It refers to the scheduled hour in which students and leaders of the social circus gather for a discussion on the status, successes, and problems of the circus. The Circle's ritual and physical shape embody a moment of complicity in which everyone is in harmony, subjectively thinking together, although differently, about solutions, paths, and options for the daily questions and challenges.

This youth reflection represents the right for everyone to speak, disagree, express opinions, and make contributions. The circle's dialog is essential to the social circus' pedagogical method, as it contributes to the composition of a liberal, critical, and democratic education.

By participating in the Circle, the participating youth develop a conscientiousness born through hearing other opinions and thoughts and through the articulation of their own. Reflection, dialog, and communication are elements that allow youth to take into account their place in the world, decisions, errors, and questions. Such personal analysis has direct implications to the development of the youth's reality and even his perception of reality. They learn to coexist in a peaceful, constructive, and respectable manner, and in doing so, implement such behavior into their daily lives.

The Circle gives youth an opportunity to vocalize their thoughts and ideas, to hear other opinions on their own, and to sometimes see their opinions incorporated into the social circus. This process valorizes the youth who in turn perceives the importance of his own knowledge. Thus, a transformation ensues: once seeing himself as incapable and inadequate, the youth, through the Circle, becomes a confident and conscious being, with increased self-esteem and self-awareness.
