= Daniel Bennett =

Daniel Bennett may refer to:

- Dan Bennett, American comedian and juggler
- Daniel Bennett (footballer) (born 1978), soccer player for the Singapore national football team
- Daniel Bennett (referee) (born 1976), English-South African football referee
- Daniel Bennett (journalist), editor of BBC Science Focus
- Daniel Bennett (saxophonist) (born 1979), American saxophonist

== See also ==
- Daniel Dennett (1942–2024), American philosopher
