= Cornelia Frances =

English-Australian actress (1941–2018)

Cornelia Frances OAM
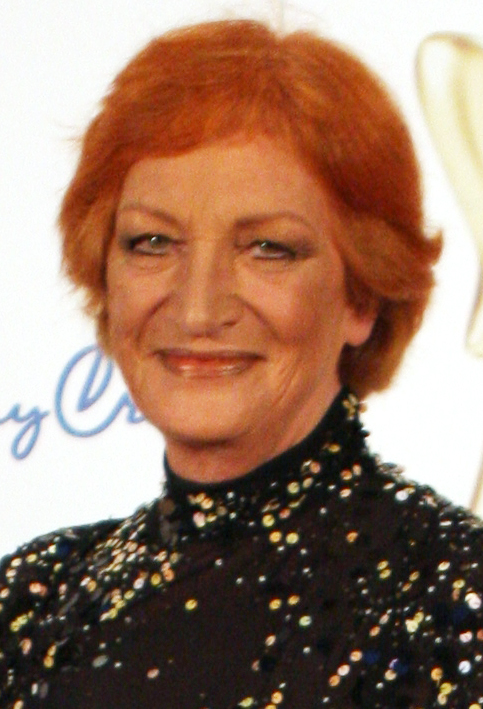
- Frances at the 2011 Logie Awards
- Born: Cornelia Frances Zulver; 7 April 1941; Liverpool, Lancashire, England
- Died: 28 May 2018 (aged 77); Sydney, New South Wales, Australia
- Other name: Corney Frances (nickname)
- Education: Guildhall School of Music and Drama
- Occupation: Actress
- Years active: 1959–2017
- Notable work: The Young Doctors as Sister/Matron Grace Scott; The Box (film version) as Dr. Sheila M. Winter; Sons and Daughters as Barbara Hamilton; Home and Away as Morag Bellingham; The Weakest Link (game show) as Host
- Spouse(s): Michael Eastland (m.1969–divorced)
- Children: 1
- Family: Michael Powell (uncle)

Cornelia Frances Zulver (7 April 1941 – 28 May 2018), credited professionally as Cornelia Frances, was an English-Australian actress. After starting her career in small cameos in films in her native England, she became best known for her acting career in Australia after emigrating there in the 1960s, particularly her iconic television soap opera roles with portrayals of nasty characters.

Frances featured in numerous Crawford Production series, but first became notable for starring in The Young Doctors (1976–1978), as acidic Sister later Matron Grace Scott. Subsequently, she appeared in soap opera Sons and Daughters as Barbara Armstrong Hamilton on Network Seven (1982–1986). She appeared in the film version of regular series TV soap The Box. She also worked on stage and in voice-over.

She played Morag Bellingham in Home and Away from its inception in 1988. After leaving the series she made numerous guest appearances, then re-joined the series as a permanent cast member in 2001, before going back to an itinerant basis until her final appearance in 2017.

In the early 2000s, she was the host of the Australian version of British quiz show, The Weakest Link.

== Early life ==
Frances was born on April 7, 1941 in Liverpool, Merseyside, England, to Louis Zulver, a marine engineer with Dutch heritage and Margaret (Peg) Zulver, the daughter of Irish immigrants.

When Frances was only a few weeks old, the family home was destroyed by the Luftwaffe during the Liverpool Blitz, and they moved to Purley, Surrey. Frances was educated at a Catholic convent in Surrey, from the age of 4. She became interested in music and drama, performing in Nativity plays. By the age of twelve she aspired to become an actress, much to the disapproval of the nuns at the convent.

Frances' parents divorced when she was six, and together with her mother, she went to live with her maternal uncle, and then her grandfather Cornelius. Her mother later remarried Colonel Roy Leyland, and the family moved to Yateley, Hampshire, near the Sandhurst Royal Military Academy. Through the marriage, Frances gained two step-sisters, Suzanne and Annette, and in 1957, a half-sister Francesca.

At the age of 16, Frances went on to study at the Guildhall School of Music and Drama in London, moving in with her grandmother Frances in Marylebone, for the duration. Following the completion of her diploma, Frances' uncle, film director Michael Powell helped her secure an agent, and a few weeks later, she landed her first film role as an extra in the 1960 comedy Dentist in the Chair.

In her early twenties, Frances reconnected with her father, who had remarried and was running a pub near Stratford-upon-Avon. There she met her step-mother Molly and half-siblings, Philippa and Andrew.

== Career ==
Frances' career began in British-made feature films as an extra and bit-part player, including uncredited parts in two films directed by her uncle, Michael Powell – the 1960 horror/thriller Peeping Tom and 1961 military drama The Queen's Guards. She also appeared in various theatre productions all while working off jobs at department stores and as a receptionist, in order to maintain a steady income.

Frances worked as a house model for Vendome Prêt à Porter for a couple of years, but after struggling to secure further roles in the UK, she relocated to Australia in 1965, following future husband, Michael Eastland. She continued to model in Perth before making her television debut on Roundabout, presenting a shopping and fashion segment. She also secured a role as presenter of the six o'clock news bulletin, but was let go after committing a gaff, when she forgot to mute her microphone and was caught swearing about her nerves, which was transmitting live. When Roundabout ended, Frances toured Western Australia with the Perth Playhouse, in four different plays.

Frances and Eastland returned to England to get married, and stayed for a further three years, where she appeared in further theatre productions, before landing a small role in a 1969 adaptation of Goodbye Mr Chips, opposite Peter O'Toole and Petula Clark.

The couple permanently emigrated to Australia in 1970, where Frances worked at the Playhouse Theatre in Perth. She appeared nightly on television as the host of Channel 9's Tom's TV Bingo (Tom's was a supermarket in Perth). In 1970, she secured a role as fashion model Georgina Clausen in two episodes of Australian series Dynasty, reprising the character in the spin-off series Catwalk (albeit renamed Cornelia Heyson). She subsequently landed further guest roles in Boney, Ryan, Silent Number, Division 4 and Matlock Police.

Frances then scored a lead role in The Box, the 1975 film adaptation of the sex-comedy soap opera of the same name, and in 1976 she played Mrs Quinn in The Lost Islands. She became known across Australia for her long-running role as the strict and acidic Sister Grace Scott in the daily soap opera, The Young Doctors, a part written specially for her.

After leaving the series to move to Melbourne, she worked as a television reporter on 'light' stories for Peter Couchman's Melbourne, a current affairs program hosted by Peter Couchman.

In April 1980, Frances made a guest appearance as lawyer Carmel Saunders on Prisoner. She then guest-starred in several more television shows, before taking another well-remembered role, as Barbara Armstrong (later Hamilton) in Sons and Daughters, which she played from 1982 until 1986, before her character was written out. The role saw her nominated for two Logie Awards.

In 1988, Frances played an Irish landlady in feature film The Man from Snowy River II, although several of her scenes with Brian Dennehy were edited out.

On 7 June 1988, Frances made her first appearance on Home and Away as long-running character Morag Bellingham, a judge, and the sister of long-running character Alf Stewart (Ray Meagher), as well as the sister of character Celia Stewart (Fiona Spence) and half-sister of character Colleen Smart (Lyn Collingwood). Frances played the recurring role of Morag for twenty-nine years. She expressed a desire to play Morag full-time on the show, and admitted that she did not like the coming-and-going as it was "very unsettling."

In 1990, Frances appeared in Snow White and the Seven Dwarfs, her first pantomime, playing the Wicked Queen, alongside fellow Home and Away cast members in the UK. Later that year, she returned to the UK, to appear in a stage production of Caravan, opposite Noel Hodda and Alan Dale, followed by another pantomime, Dick Whittington, playing Queen Rat.

From 1997 to 1998, Frances provided the voice of Tortoise on the Australian/Chinese children's series, Magic Mountain. She also hosted the Australian version of the quiz show, The Weakest Link (2001–2002). In the early 2000s, she worked for a winery in the Hunter Valley when she could not get acting work.

Frances' autobiography And What Have You Done Lately? was published in 2003. She had plans to release two new novels, however these never eventuated. In the mid-2000s, a thief broke into her home whilst she was on holiday in the UK, stealing valuables, including her laptop, which held the only copy of her work. She contemplated a rewrite, but eventually abandoned the idea.

Frances' later career involved voice acting in New Zealand animated children's series Milly, Molly (2008–2009) and a main role in the 2010 Australian stage production of Calendar Girls, as well as ongoing guest-spots on Home and Away, where she made her final acting appearance in 2017.

On 26 January 2019, eight months after her death, Frances was posthumously awarded the Medal of the Order of Australia (OAM) for her services to the Performing Arts, in the Australia Day honours.

== Charity work ==
In 2011, Frances joined the Australian Orangutan Project (AOP) as its first Ambassador in an effort to raise awareness about critically endangered orangutans. Frances travelled to the island of Borneo, Indonesia, on 16 October 2011 to see first-hand the effect of the widespread deforestation of orangutan habitat, and how orangutans were being rehabilitated.

== Personal life and death ==
While working on The Trials of Oscar Wilde, Frances met her first love, writer and director Ken Hughes (of Chitty Chitty Bang Bang fame), with whom she had an 18-month relationship.

In 1964, Corney began dating Michael Eastland after meeting at a wedding in Luton. In March 1965, Eastland emigrated to Australia under the 'Ten Pound Poms' scheme, and Frances joined him in September of the same year. They spent a few months in Sydney, before settling in Perth in 1966. After the required minimum of a two-year stay under the scheme, the couple returned to England in 1967. Two days before their ship arrived, Frances' father Louis died.

Frances married Eastland in April 1969 at Sandhurst Military College before relocating to Australia permanently in 1970, settling in Sydney. They had one son together, named Lawrence, born on 11 June 1971. After an incident involving an intruder at their home in Bondi Junction, the family moved to Neutral Bay.

After growing apart, Frances and Eastland separated in 1981, shortly after her 40th birthday. They remained good friends and continued to live together for some time afterwards.

During Frances' time on Sons and Daughters, her mother and stepfather Roy visited her in Australia, for the final time. Roy died in January 1984, a week after they returned to the UK.

In 1990, due to appear in the pantomime, Snow White and the Seven Dwarfs, Frances flew over to the UK several weeks early upon news that her mother was gravely ill. She was able to spend two days with her before she died.

In February 2001, Frances became a grandmother, through Lawrence, to a girl named Tipani.

In January 2018, Frances revealed that she was battling bladder cancer that had spread to her hip, but stated that she was hopeful of reprising her role of Morag Bellingham in Home and Away for the show's 30th anniversary. The following month, she appeared in an interview from her bed, for A Current Affair and on 7 April 2018, she celebrated her 77th birthday, with fellow actors and friends, Judy Nunn, Bruce Venables, Axle Whitehead, Paula Duncan, Andrew McFarlane and Dan Bennett, around her hospital bed.

Frances' cancer metastasised to her spine, despite having undergone chemotherapy and radiation treatment. She died on 28 May 2018, aged 77, at the Royal North Shore Hospital in Sydney, where the show The Young Doctors was coincidentally filmed, with her son Lawrence by her side.

Paying tribute to Frances, the Seven Network, which airs Home and Away in Australia, said: "Cornelia Frances was a unique person. Her on-screen presence inspired a generation of actors. This gift was coupled with an ability to bring a sense of dignity and presence into each room she entered. Her energy and character will be missed." She was also given tributes from her numerous co-stars including Ray Meagher and Judy Nunn. A private funeral was held on Thursday 31 May with her family and closest friends in attendance.

== Filmography ==
=== Film ===
| Year | Title | Role | Type |
|---|---|---|---|
| 1960 | Peeping Tom | Girl in sports car leaving studio | Feature film |
| 1961 | The Queen's Guards | Officer's girlfriend (uncredited) | Feature film |
| 1969 | Goodbye, Mr. Chips | The 'Dyke' (uncredited) | Feature film |
| 1975 | The Box | Dr. Sheila M. Winter | Feature film |
| 1976 | I Can't Seem to Talk About It | Woman | Film short |
| 1981 | Post Synchronisation | | Film short |
| 1988 | The Man from Snowy River II | Mrs. Darcy | Feature film |
| 1989 | Minnamurra (aka Outback or Wrangler) | Caroline Richards | Feature film |
| 2002 | Cash Out | | Film short |
| 2003 | Ned | Tina | Feature film |

=== Television ===
| Year | Title | Role | Notes |
|---|---|---|---|
| 1970 | Dynasty | Georgina Clausen | Season 1, episodes 2 & 10 |
| 1971–1972 | Catwalk | Cornelia Heyson | Season 1, 13 episodes |
| 1973 | Boney | Stella Borredale | Season 2, episode 3 |
| 1973 | Serpent in the Rainbow | | Miniseries |
| 1973 | Ryan | Amelia | Season 1, episode 16 |
| 1974 | Matlock Police | Catherine Upton | Season 4, episode 4 |
| 1974 | Homicide | Veronica Coates | Season 11, episode 5 |
| 1974 | Division 4 | Angela Ward | Season 6, episode 12 |
| 1974 | Essington | | TV film |
| 1974 | Silent Number | Ivy | Season 1, episode 15 |
| 1974 | Behind the Legend | | Season 2, episode 10 |
| 1974 | Division 4 | Sandra Fleming | Season 7, episode 1 |
| 1974 | This Love Affair | | Anthology series, 1 episode |
| 1975 | Matlock Police | Barbara Anderson | Season 5, episode 15 |
| 1975 | Homicide | Julie Kurnow | Season 12, episode 27 |
| 1975 | Last Rites | | TV film |
| 1975 | The Box | Dr. Sheila M. Winter | |
| 1975 | Two-Way Mirror | Liz Hardy | TV pilot |
| 1976 | Homicide | Nancy Lofthouse | Season 13, episode 5 |
| 1976 | King's Men | | Season 1, episode 3 |
| 1976 | Murcheson Creek | | TV film |
| 1976 | The Lost Islands | Elizabeth Quinn | Season 1, 17 episodes |
| 1976–1979 | The Young Doctors | Grace Scott | Seasons 1–4, 589 episodes |
| 1977 | The Outsiders | Mrs. Foster | Season 1, episode 11 |
| 1977 | All at Sea | Miss Swallow | TV film |
| 1978 | Tickled Pink | Joan Jefferson | Season 1, episode 1 |
| 1979 | Cop Shop | Anne Carter | Season 2, episodes 13–14 |
| 1979 | Cop Shop | Ruth Coleman | Season 2, episodes 81–82 |
| 1979 | Skyways | Susan Winters | 1 episode |
| Unknown | Skyways | Wendy Kirk | 1 episode |
| 1980 | Prisoner | Carmel Saunders | Season 2, 4 episodes |
| 1980 | A Wild Ass of a Man | Sibella Wolfenden | TV film |
| 1980 | Secret Valley | | Season 1, episode 23 |
| 1980–1982 | Kingswood Country | Dr. Hemingway | Seasons 2–4, 3 episodes |
| 1981 | Outbreak of Love | | Miniseries, 1 episode |
| 1981 | Punishment | Cathy Wells | 1 episode |
| 1981 | Bellamy | Aretha | Season 1, episode 18 |
| 1981 | Cop Shop | Louise Doyle | Season 4, episodes 85–86 |
| 1982–1986 | Sons and Daughters | Barbara Armstrong/Hamilton | Seasons 1–5, 523 episodes |
| 1983 | Outbreak of Hostilities | Miriam | TV film |
| 1983–1984 | Runaway Island | Agatha McLeod | TV film |
| 1987 | Jackal and Hide | Madame Zentha | TV pilot |
| 1988–1989, 1993, 2001–2009, 2011–2013, 2016–2017 | Home and Away | Morag Bellingham | Seasons 1–2 (recurring), Season 2 (main), Seasons 6, 14–22, 24–26, 29–30 (recurring), 490 episodes |
| 1989 | Future Past | Mother | TV film |
| 1991 | Pirates Island | Captain Blackheart | TV film |
| 1995 | The Ferals | Teacher | Season 2, episode 7 |
| 1995 | G.P. | Lindy | Season 7, episode 35 |
| 1997–1998 | Magic Mountain | Tortoise (voice) | |
| 2003 | Always Greener | Janet Frewley | Season 2, episodes 21 & 22 |
| 2003 | Pizza | Welfare | Season 3, episode 1 |
| 2008 | Milly, Molly | Aunt Maude (voice) | Seasons 1–2 |

== Stage ==
| Year | Title | Role | Location |
|---|---|---|---|
| | Boeing-Boeing | | Theatre Royal, Bath |
| | Jane Steps Out | | Theatre Royal, Bath |
| 1967 | Julius Caesar | | Western Australian tour |
| 1967 | Henry IV | | Playhouse Theatre, Perth |
| | Mary, Mary | | Western Australia regional tour |
| 1975 | The Political Bordello; or, How Waiters Got the Vote | | Bondi Pavilion, Sydney |
| 1975 | No Man's Land | | Nimrod Theatre Company, Sydney |
| 1977 | The Visit | | Bondi Pavilion, Sydney |
| 1986 | Agnes of God | Mother Miriam | New Moon Theatre Company |
| 1987 | A Lie of the Mind | Lorraine | Belvoir St Theatre, Sydney |
| 1990 | How the Other Half Loves | | Footbridge Theatre, Sydney |
| 1990 | Snow White and the Seven Dwarfs | The Wicked Queen | Southend-on-Sea |
| 1991 | Dick Whittington | Queen Rat | Rhyll, North Wales |
| 1991 | Caravan | Monica Rice | Churchill Theatre, London, Theatre Royal, Lincoln, Adam Smith Centre, Kirkcaldy |
| 1992 | The Heiress | Lavinia Penniman | Marian St Theatre, Sydney |
| 1994 | Steaming | | Theatre Royal, Sydney, Australian & NZ tour |
| 1998 | Diving for Pearls | Marj | Ensemble Theatre, Sydney |
| 2005 | Love Letters | Melissa Gardner | NIDA Parade Theatre, Sydney |
| 2010 | Calendar Girls | Chair of Yorkshire Women's Institute | Lyric Theatre, Brisbane, Theatre Royal, Sydney, Comedy Theatre, Melbourne |

== Awards ==
| Year | Work | Award | Category | Result |
|---|---|---|---|---|
| 1984 | Sons and Daughters | Logie Awards | Best Supporting Actress in a Series | Nominated |
| | Sons and Daughters | Logie Awards | | Nominated |
| 2019 | Cornelia Frances | Medal of the Order of Australia (OAM) | Recognition for services in the Performing Arts | Honoured |
