= The ABC Bunny =

1933 book by Wanda Gág

- First edition
- Author: Wanda Gág
- Illustrator: Wanda Gág & Howard Gág
- Language: English
- Genre: Children's literature / picturebook
- Publisher: Coward
- Publication date: 1933
- Publication place: United States
- Media type: Print (Hardcover)
- Pages: 32
- ISBN: 978-0-698-20000-5

The ABC Bunny is a 1933 children's alphabet picture book illustrated by Wanda Gág and hand lettered by Howard Gág, her brother. Wanda created the book for one of her nephews. The book earned a Newbery Honor in 1933, Wanda's second after Millions of Cats, also a picture book and hand lettered by Howard. It was the last picture book to be recognized by the American Library Association until 1972 (Annie and the Old One), as in 1938, the Caldecott Medal was created specifically to honor children's picture books.

== Plot ==
The rhythmic and rhyming text tells the story of Bunny, who is driven from Bunnyland to Elsewhere after an unfortunate accident with an apple. Every letter in the alphabet is represented in Bunny's journey: 'G' for Gale, 'I' for Insect, and so on.

== ABC Song ==
Included in the back of the book is sheet music to the "ABC Song", which was composed by the author's sister, Flavia Gág.
