= 2016 Lilly Diabetes 250 =

NASCAR stock car race held in Indianapolis, Indiana, U.S.

Race details
- Race 18 of 33 in the 2016 NASCAR Xfinity Series
- Date: July 23, 2016
- Location: Indianapolis Motor Speedway in Speedway, Indiana
- Course: Permanent racing facility
- Course length: 2.5 miles (4.0 km)
- Distance: 63 laps, 157.5 mi (253.471 km)
- Scheduled distance: 60 laps, 150 mi (241.40 km)
- Average speed: 136.298 miles per hour (219.350 km/h)

Pole position
Driver	Kyle Busch	Joe Gibbs Racing
- Time: 49.467

Most laps led
Driver	Kyle Busch	Joe Gibbs Racing
- Laps: 62

Winner
No. 18	Kyle Busch	Joe Gibbs Racing

Television in the United States
- Network: NBCSN
- Announcers: Rick Allen, Jeff Burton and Steve Letarte

The 2016 Lilly Diabetes 250 was a NASCAR Xfinity Series race that was held on July 23, 2016, at Indianapolis Motor Speedway in Indianapolis, Indiana. Contested over 63 laps on the 2.5-mile-long (2.48 km) asphalt speedway, extended from the original 60 laps due to an overtime finish, it was the 18th race of the 2016 NASCAR Xfinity Series season.

The race, along with the 3 other Dash 4 Cash races, had reduced laps to create two additional heat races.

Kyle Busch dominated the race, leading all but one lap for his 82nd career Xfinity Series win.

== Report ==
=== Background ===
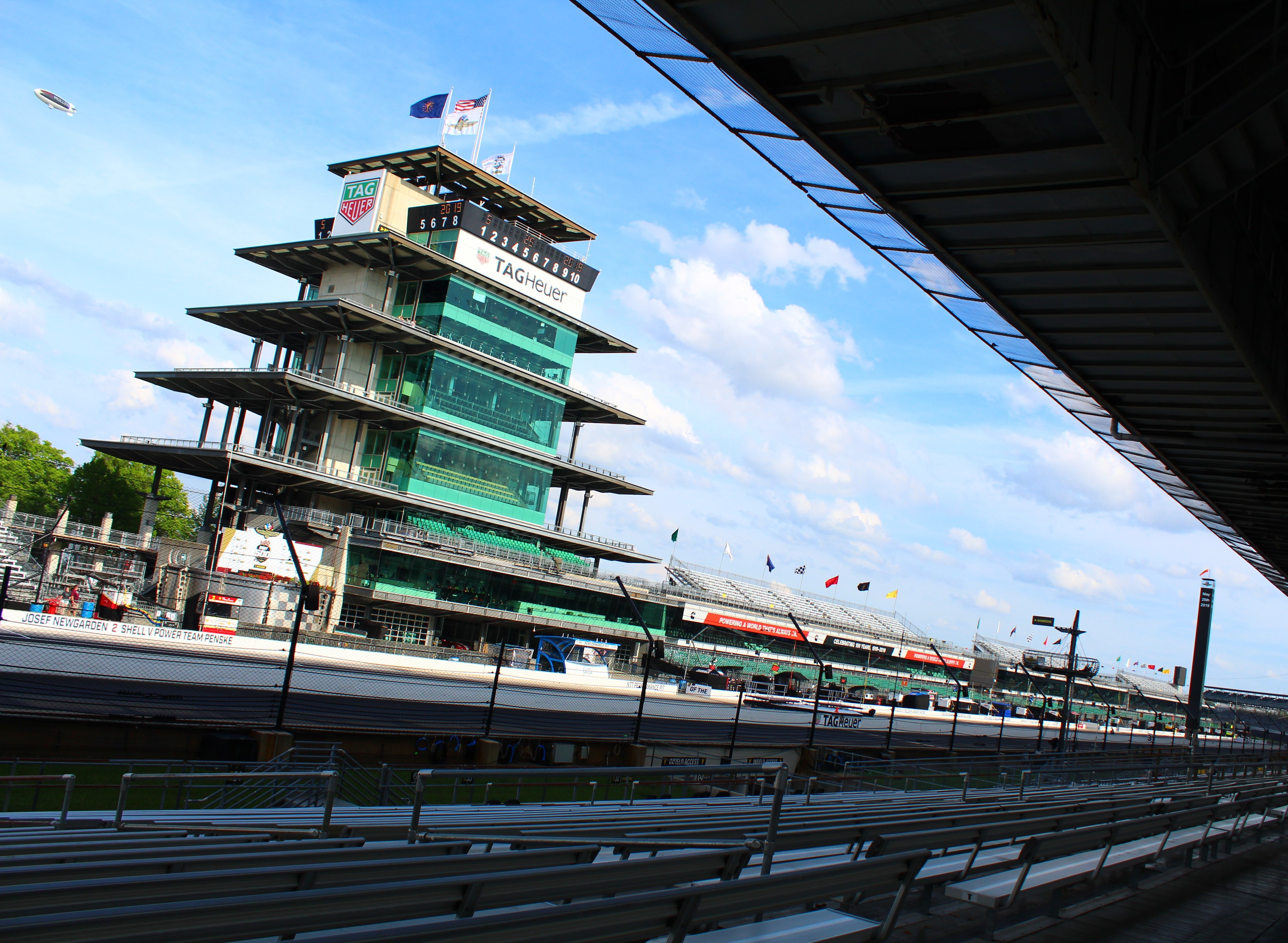
The Pagoda, the control tower, which houses officials, broadcasting, and hospitality suites, is an icon at the Indianapolis Motor Speedway.

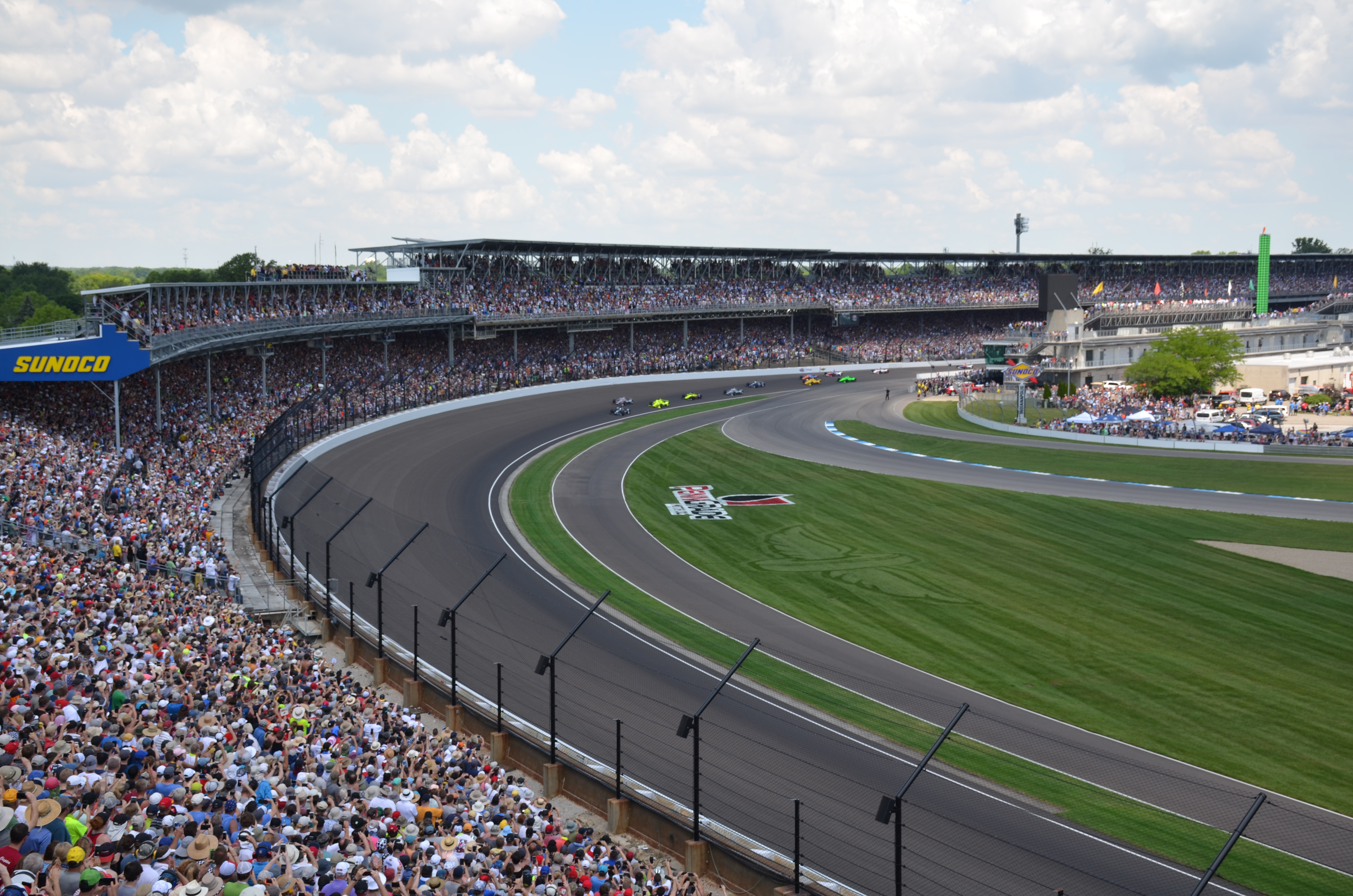
Turn one at the Indianapolis Motor Speedway.

The Indianapolis Motor Speedway, located in Speedway, Indiana, (an enclave suburb of Indianapolis) in the United States, is the home of the Indianapolis 500 and the Brickyard 400. It is located on the corner of 16th Street and Georgetown Road, approximately six miles (10 km) west of Downtown Indianapolis.

Constructed in 1909, it is the original speedway, the first racing facility so named. It has a permanent seating capacity estimated at 235,000 with infield seating raising capacity to an approximate 400,000. It is the highest-capacity sports venue in the world.

Considered relatively flat by American standards, the track is a 2.5-mile (4.0 km), nearly rectangular oval with dimensions that have remained essentially unchanged since its inception: four 0.25-mile (0.40 km) turns, two 0.625-mile-long (1.006 km) straightaways between the fourth and first turns and the second and third turns, and two .125-mile (0.201 km) short straightaways – termed "short chutes" – between the first and second, and third and fourth turns.

The track also holds races on its infield road course, formerly the Verizon 200 at the Brickyard, from 2021 to 2023 and currently the Sonsio Grand Prix.

==== Entry list ====
- (R) denotes rookie driver.
- (i) denotes driver who is ineligible for series driver points.

No.	Driver	Team	Manufacturer
0	Garrett Smithley (R)	JD Motorsports	Chevrolet
01	Ryan Preece	JD Motorsports	Chevrolet
1	Elliott Sadler	JR Motorsports	Chevrolet
2	Paul Menard (i)	Richard Childress Racing	Chevrolet
3	Ty Dillon	Richard Childress Racing	Chevrolet
4	Ross Chastain	JD Motorsports	Chevrolet
6	Bubba Wallace	Roush Fenway Racing	Ford
07	Ray Black Jr.	SS-Green Light Racing	Chevrolet
7	Justin Allgaier	JR Motorsports	Chevrolet
10	Matt DiBenedetto (i)	TriStar Motorsports	Toyota
11	Blake Koch	Kaulig Racing	Chevrolet
13	Harrison Rhodes	MBM Motorsports	Toyota
14	Jeff Green	TriStar Motorsports	Toyota
15	Todd Peck	B. J. McLeod Motorsports	Ford
16	Ryan Reed	Roush Fenway Racing	Ford
18	Kyle Busch (i)	Joe Gibbs Racing	Toyota
19	Daniel Suárez	Joe Gibbs Racing	Toyota
20	Erik Jones (R)	Joe Gibbs Racing	Toyota
22	Joey Logano (i)	Team Penske	Ford
25	Stanton Barrett	Rick Ware Racing	Chevrolet
28	Dakoda Armstrong	JGL Racing	Toyota
33	Brandon Jones (R)	Richard Childress Racing	Chevrolet
39	Ryan Sieg	RSS Racing	Chevrolet
40	Timmy Hill (i)	MBM Motorsports	Dodge
42	Kyle Larson (i)	Chip Ganassi Racing	Chevrolet
44	J. J. Yeley	TriStar Motorsports	Toyota
46	Brandon Gdovic	Precision Performance Motorsports	Chevrolet
48	Brennan Poole (R)	Chip Ganassi Racing	Chevrolet
51	Jeremy Clements	Jeremy Clements Racing	Chevrolet
52	Joey Gase	Jimmy Means Racing	Chevrolet
62	Brendan Gaughan	Richard Childress Racing	Chevrolet
70	Derrike Cope	Derrike Cope Racing with JP Motorsports	Chevrolet
74	Mike Harmon	Mike Harmon Racing	Dodge
77	T. J. Bell	Obaika Racing	Chevrolet
78	B. J. McLeod (R)	B. J. McLeod Motorsports	Ford
88	Kevin Harvick (i)	JR Motorsports	Chevrolet
89	Morgan Shepard	Shepherd Racing Ventures	Chevrolet
90	Mario Gosselin	King Autosport	Chevrolet
93	David Starr	RSS Racing	Chevrolet
97	Ryan Ellis	Obaika Racing	Chevrolet
98	Jeb Burton	Biagi-DenBeste Racing	Ford

== Practice ==
Kyle Busch was the fastest in the practice session with a time of 50.976 seconds and a speed of 176.554 mph (284.136 km/h).

=== Practice results ===
Pos	No.	Driver	Team	Manufacturer	Time	Speed
1	18	Kyle Busch (i)	Joe Gibbs Racing	Toyota	50.976	176.554
2	20	Erik Jones (R)	Joe Gibbs Racing	Toyota	51.100	176.125
3	19	Daniel Suárez	Joe Gibbs Racing	Toyota	51.171	175.881
Official practice results

== Qualifying ==
Pos	No.	Driver	Team	Manufacturer	R1	R2
1	18	Kyle Busch (i)	Joe Gibbs Racing	Toyota	49.478	49.467
2	20	Erik Jones	Joe Gibbs Racing	Toyota	49.377	49.469
3	42	Kyle Larson (i)	Chip Ganassi Racing	Chevrolet	49.468	49.695
4	88	Kevin Harvick (i)	JR Racing	Chevrolet	50.103	50.030
5	19	Daniel Suárez	Joe Gibbs Racing	Toyota	49.933	50.031
6	7	Justin Allgaier	JR Motorsports	Chevrolet	50.292	50.210
7	22	Joey Logano (i)	Team Penske	Ford	50.206	50.235
8	2	Paul Menard (i)	Richard Childress Racing	Chevrolet	50.076	50.283
9	16	Ryan Reed	Roush Fenway Racing	Ford	50.319	50.719
10	48	Brennan Poole (R)	Chip Ganassi Racing	Chevrolet	50.006	51.009
11	33	Brandon Jones (R)	Richard Childress Racing	Chevrolet	50.226	51.264
12	39	Ryan Sieg	RSS Racing	Chevrolet	50.312	51.338
13	11	Blake Koch	Kaulig Racing	Chevrolet	50.345	—
14	6	Bubba Wallace	Roush Fenway Racing	Ford	50.539	—
15	98	Jeb Burton	Biagi-DenBeste Racing	Ford	50.586	—
16	3	Ty Dillon	Richard Childress Racing	Chevrolet	53.603	—
17	51	Jeremy Clements	Jeremy Clements Racing	Chevrolet	50.683	—
18	62	Brendan Gaughan	Richard Childress Racing	Chevrolet	50.821	—
19	1	Elliott Sadler	JR Motorsports	Chevrolet	50.826	—
20	28	Dakoda Armstrong	JGL Racing	Toyota	51.009	—
21	10	Matt DiBenedetto (i)	TriStar Motorsports	Toyota	51.022	—
22	07	Ray Black Jr (R)	SS-Green Light Racing	Chevrolet	51.212	—
23	01	Ryan Preece (R)	JD Motorsports	Chevrolet	51.278	—
24	4	Ross Chastain	JD Motorsports	Chevrolet	51.300	—
25	44	J. J. Yeley	TriStar Motorsports	Toyota	51.348	—
26	78	B. J. McLeod (R)	B. J. McLeod Motorsports	Ford	51.481	—
27	14	Jeff Green	TriStar Motorsports	Toyota	51.512	—
28	93	David Starr	RSS Racing	Chevrolet	51.588	—
29	0	Garrett Smithley (R)	JD Motorsports	Chevrolet	51.697	—
30	46	Brandon Gdovic	Precision Performance Motorsports	Chevrolet	51.819	—
31	40	Timmy Hill (i)	MBM Motorsports	Dodge	52.249	—
32	97	Ryan Ellis	Obaika Racing	Chevrolet	52.902	—
33	89	Morgan Shepard	Shepherd Racing Ventures	Chevrolet	52.989	—
Qualified by owner's points
34	52	Joey Gase	Jimmy Means Racing	Chevrolet	53.027	—
35	13	Harrison Rhodes	MBM Motorsports	Toyota	53.033	—
36	70	Derrike Cope	Derrike Cope Racing with JP Motorsports	Chevrolet	53.242	—
37	25	Stanton Barrett	Rick Ware Racing	Chevrolet	54.140	—
38	15	Todd Peck	B. J. McLeod Motorsports	Ford	54.209	—
39	74	Mike Harmon	Mike Harmon Racing	Dodge	54.379	—
40	90	Mario Gosselin	King Autosport	Chevrolet	54.910	—
Failed to qualify
41	77	T. J. Bell	Obaika Racing	Chevrolet	56.757	—
Official qualifying results

== Heat Races ==
=== Heat Race 1 ===
Laps: 20; inside row (odds)

Pos	No	Driver	Team	Manufacturer	Laps
1	18	Kyle Busch (i)	Joe Gibbs Racing	Toyota	20
2	42	Kyle Larson (i)	Chip Ganassi Racing	Chevrolet	20
3	22	Joey Logano (i)	Team Penske	Ford	20
4	19	Daniel Suárez	Joe Gibbs Racing	Toyota	20
5	1	Elliott Sadler	JR Motorsports	Chevrolet	20
6	98	Jeb Burton	Biagi-DenBeste Racing	Ford	20
7	33	Brandon Jones (R)	Richard Childress Racing	Chevrolet	20
8	16	Ryan Reed	Roush Fenway Racing	Ford	20
9	11	Blake Koch	Kaulig Racing	Chevrolet	20
10	51	Jeremy Clements	Jeremy Clements Racing	Chevrolet	20
11	44	J. J. Yeley	TriStar Motorsports	Toyota	20
12	14	Jeff Green	TriStar Motorsports	Toyota	20
13	0	Garrett Smithley	JD Motorsports	Chevrolet	20
14	01	Ryan Preece (R)	JD Motorsports	Chevrolet	19
15	13	Harrison Rhodes	MBM Motorsports	Toyota	18
16	25	Stanton Barrett	Rick Ware Racing	Chevrolet	17
17	74	Mike Harmon	Mike Harmon Racing	Dodge	6
18	89	Morgan Shepard	Shepherd Racing Ventures	Chevrolet	3
19	40	Timmy Hill (i)	MBM Motorsports	Dodge	3
20	10	Matt DiBenedetto (i)	TriStar Motorsports	Toyota	2
Heat race 1 results

=== Heat Race 2 ===
Laps: 20; outside row (evens)

Pos	No	Driver	Team	Manufacturer	Laps
1	20	Erik Jones (R)	Joe Gibbs Racing	Toyota	20
2	88	Kevin Harvick (i)	Richard Childress Racing	Chevrolet	20
3	7	Justin Allgaier	JR Motorsports	Chevrolet	20
4	2	Paul Menard (i)	Richard Childress Racing	Chevrolet	20
5	48	Brennan Poole (R)	Chip Ganassi Racing	Chevrolet	20
6	3	Ty Dillon	Richard Childress Racing	Chevrolet	20
7	6	Bubba Wallace	Roush Fenway Racing	Ford	20
8	62	Brendan Gaughan	Richard Childress Racing	Chevrolet	20
9	39	Ryan Sieg	RSS Racing	Chevrolet	20
10	28	Dakoda Armstrong	JGL Racing	Toyota	20
11	4	Ross Chastain	JD Motorsports	Chevrolet	20
12	07	Ray Black Jr. (R)	SS-Green Light Racing	Chevrolet	20
13	46	Brandon Gdovic	Precision Performance Motorsports	Chevrolet	20
14	78	B. J. McLeod (R)	B. J. McLeod Motorsports	Ford	20
15	93	David Starr	RSS Racing	Chevrolet	20
16	90	Mario Gosselin	King Autosport	Chevrolet	19
17	97	Ryan Ellis	Obaika Racing	Chevrolet	19
18	70	Derrike Cope	Derrike Cope Racing with JP Motorsports	Chevrolet	19
19	52	Joey Gase	Jimmy Means Racing	Chevrolet	19
20	15	Todd Peck	B. J. McLeod Motorsports	Ford	15
Heat race 1 results

== Race Results ==
Laps: 60

Pos	Grid	No	Driver	Team	Manufacturer	Laps	Points
1	1	18	Kyle Busch (i)	Joe Gibbs Racing	Toyota	63	0
2	4	88	Kevin Harvick (i)	JR Motorsports	Chevrolet	63	0
3	8	2	Paul Menard (i)	Richard Childress Racing	Chevrolet	63	0
4	3	42	Kyle Larson (i)	Chip Ganassi Racing	Chevrolet	63	0
5	6	7	Justin Allgaier	JR Motorsports	Chevrolet	63	36
6	9	1	Elliott Sadler	JR Motorsports	Chevrolet	63	35
7	7	19	Daniel Suarez	Joe Gibbs Racing	Toyota	63	34
8	5	22	Joey Logano (i)	Team Penske	Ford	63	0
9	12	3	Ty Dillon	Richard Childress Racing	Chevrolet	63	32
10	13	33	Brandon Jones (R)	Richard Childress Racing	Chevrolet	63	31
11	10	48	Brennan Poole (R)	Chip Ganassi Racing	Chevrolet	63	30
12	11	98	Jeb Burton	Biagi-DenBeste Racing	Ford	63	29
13	15	16	Ryan Reed	Roush Fenway Racing	Ford	62	28
14	14	6	Bubba Wallace	Roush Fenway Racing	Ford	62	27
15	17	11	Blake Kosh	Kaulig Racing	Chevrolet	62	26
16	16	62	Brendan Gaughan	Richard Childress Racing	Chevrolet	62	26
17	19	51	Jeremy Clements	Jeremy Clements Racing	Chevrolet	62	24
18	18	39	Ryan Sieg	RSS Racing	Chevrolet	62	23
19	21	44	J. J. Yeley	TriStar Motorsports	Toyota	62	22
20	20	28	Dakoda Armstrong	JGL Racing	Toyota	62	21
21	22	4	Ross Chastain	JD Motorsports	Chevrolet	62	20
22	2	20	Erik Jones (R)	Joe Gibbs Racing	Toyota	62	19
23	25	0	Garrett Smithley (R)	JD Motorsports	Chevrolet	61	18
24	30	93	David Starr	RSS Racing	Chevrolet	61	17
25	27	01	Ryan Preece (R)	JD Motorsports	Chevrolet	61	16
26	28	78	B. J. McLeod (R)	B. J. McLeod Motorsports	Ford	61	15
27	26	46	Brandon Gdovic	Precision Performance Motorsports	Chevrolet	60	14
28	38	52	Joey Gase	Jimmy Means Racing	Chevrolet	60	13
29	32	90	Mario Gosselin	King Autosport	Chevrolet	60	12
30	34	97	Ryan Ellis	Obaika Racing	Chevrolet	60	11
31	31	25	Stanton Barrett	Rick Ware Racing	Chevrolet	59	10
32	36	70	Derrike Cope	Derrike Cope Racing with JP Motorsports	Chevrolet	58	9
33	24	07	Ray Black Jr. (R)	SS-Green Light Racing	Chevrolet	52	8
34	29	29	Harrison Rhodes	MBM Motorsports	Toyota	51	7
35	33	74	Mike Harmon	Mike Harmon Racing	Dodge	32	6
36	23	14	Jeff Green	TriStar Motorsports	Toyota	31	5
37	35	89	Morgan Shepard	Shepherd Racing Ventures	Chevrolet	17	4
38	39	10	Matt DiBenedetto (i)	TriStar Motorsports	Toyota	13	0
39	37	40	Timmy Hill (i)	MBM Motorsports	Dodge	9	0
40	40	15	Todd Peck	B. J. McLeod Motorsports	Ford	0	1
Official race results

=== Race statistics ===
- Lead changes: 2 among 2 different drivers
- Cautions/Laps: 2 for 10 laps
- Red flags: 0
- Time of race: 1 hour, 9 minutes and 20 seconds
- Average speed: 136.298 miles per hour (219.350 km/h)

Previous race: 2016 AutoLotto 200	NASCAR Xfinity Series; 2016 season	Next race: 2016 U.S. Cellular 250
