= Nothing at All =

Nothing at All or Nothin' at All may refer to:

- Nothing at All (children's book), a 1941 picture book by Wanda Gag
- "Nothing at All" (Santana song), 2003
- "Nothing at All" (Kasey Chambers song), 2006
- "Nothin' at All", a 1986 song by Heart
- "Nothing at All", a 1957 song by The Wilburn Brothers
- "Nothing at All", a 1969 song by Status Quo from the album Spare Parts
- "Nothing at All", a 1970 song by Gentle Giant from the album Gentle Giant
- "Nothing at All", a 1975 song by Hall & Oates from the album Daryl Hall & John Oates
- "Nothing at All", a 1979 song by Dennis Waterman
- "Nothing at All", a 1984 song by The Glitter Band
- "Nothing at All", a 1991 song by Exile from the album Justice
- "Nothing at All", a 2006 song by Wired All Wrong from the album Break out the Battle Tapes
- "Nothing at All", a 2007 song by the band The Shins
- "Nothing at All", a 2023 song by Foo Fighters from the album But Here We Are
- "Nothing At All", a 2025 song by Mac DeMarco from the album Guitar
- "Nothing at All", a 2026 song by Madison Beer from the album Locket

== See also ==
- "All or Nothing at All", a song originally written in 1939
- All or Nothing at All (album), a 1958 Billie Holiday album
- "When You Say Nothing at All", a country song first released by Keith Whitley in 1988
- "Nuthin' At All", a 2005 song by rapper Bizarre
