= Wanda Gág House =

Historic house in New Ulm, Minnesota, United States

- Wanda Gág Childhood Home
- U.S. National Register of Historic Places
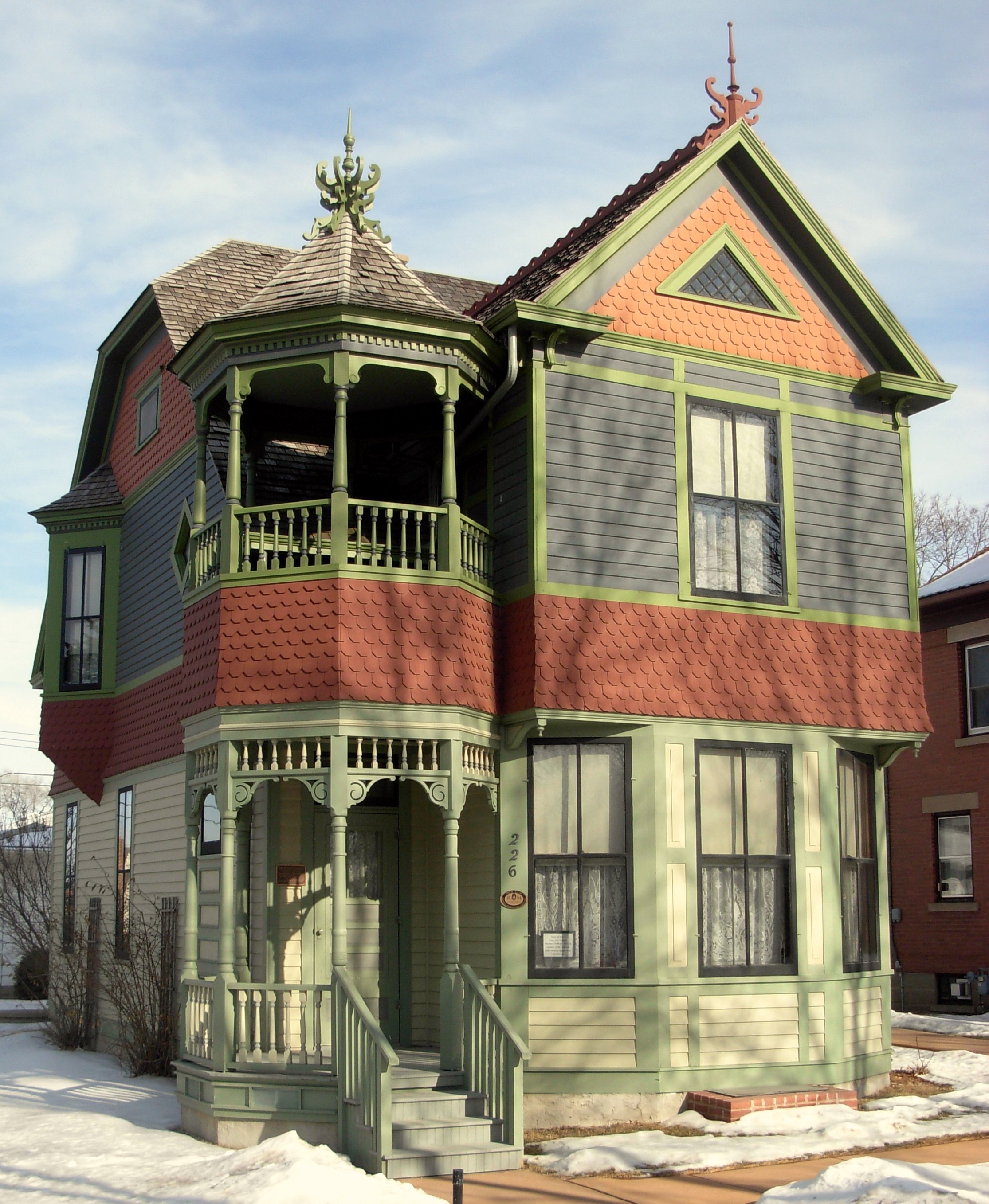

- Location within Minnesota Location within the United States
- Interactive map showing the location of Wanda Gág House
- Location: 226 N. Washington St., New Ulm, Minnesota
- Coordinates: 44°18′50″N 94°27′56″W
- Area: less than one acre
- Built: 1894
- Architectural style: Queen Anne
- MPS: Brown County MRA
- NRHP reference No.: 79001204
- Added to NRHP: December 31, 1979

Wanda Gág House Interpretive Center and Museum
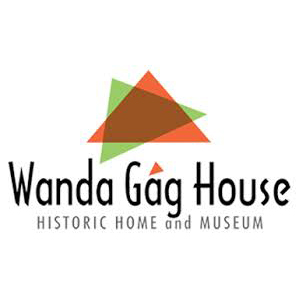
- Established: 1988
- Location: 226 N. Washington St., New Ulm, Minnesota, United States
- Type: History
- Website: wandagaghouse.org

The Wanda Gág House is a historic house museum at 226 North Washington Street in New Ulm, Minnesota.

The museum commemorates the life and legacy of author and artist Wanda Gág (1893–1946), whose childhood home this was. Gág was a noted children's author and illustrator, whose most well-known book was Millions of Cats. Gág was the eldest of seven children and the child of an artist. Wanda Gág posthumously won the 1958 Lewis Carroll Shelf Award for Millions of Cats and the 1977 Kerlan Award for her entire oeuvre.

Built in 1898, Wanda Gág's home is a fine example of Queen Anne Victorian architecture, and was listed on the National Register of Historic Places in 1979.

== Wanda Gág House Interpretive Center and Museum ==
The house museum is operated by the Wanda Gág House Association, a non-profit organization, operates the museum. Their mission is to educate and inspire the public by preserving the Gág family home, fostering appreciation for artistic excellence, and celebrating the Gág family's contributions to cultural heritage.

=== Exhibits and Collections ===
The museum features various exhibits showcasing Gág's life and artistic career:

- Lithographs and paintings by Wanda Gág, including original illustrations from her famous books.
- Paintings by other members of the artistically talented Gág family, such as her father Anton Gág and sister Flavia Gag.
- First editions and reprints of Wanda Gág's children's books.
- Archival materials related to Gág's life and career

== Description ==
The Gág House stands in an residential area just southwest of downtown New Ulm, at the junction of North Washington Street and 3rd Street North. It is a 2 1/2-story wood-frame building, with a complex roofline and exterior finished in a combination of wooden clapboards and shingles. Its front facade has a projecting gable section on the right, with a broad polygonal bay one story in height topped by a single sash window. The bay windows are interspersed with wooden panels, and a field of diamond-cut shingles is set below the upper window. To the left of the projecting section is a porch elaborately decorated with turned posts and balusters, and a spindled valance overhead.

The house was built in 1894 by Anton Gag, and served from then until 1913 as the childhood home of Wanda Gág (who adopted the accented "a" as an adult). Gág was a successful artist and illustrator, and is credited with producing one of the first picture books in 1926. The house was acquired by a non-profit organization in 1988. It was restored, and opened as a museum dedicated to Gág in 2008. The home is listed on the National Register of Historic Places.

== See also ==
- National Register of Historic Places listings in Brown County, Minnesota

== See also ==
- List of museums in Minnesota
