= Barry Oakley =

Australian writer (born 1931)

- Born: Barry Kingham Oakley; 24 February 1931 (age 95); Melbourne, Australia
- Education: Christian Brothers College, St Kilda
- Alma mater: University of Melbourne

Barry Kingham Oakley (born 24 February 1931) is an Australian writer.

== Biography ==
Born in Melbourne, Oakley was educated at Christian Brothers College, St Kilda, and the University of Melbourne. He was a secondary school teacher in Victoria from 1955 to 1962, and also lectured in humanities at RMIT University in 1963. He worked as an advertising copywriter and for the Department of Overseas Trade before his first novel, A Wild Ass of a Man, was published in 1967. He was joint winner of the Captain Cook Bicentenary Literary Award for his 1971 novel Let's Hear it for Prendergast. His early plays were performed at La Mama Theatre in Carlton.

From 1988 to 1997, Oakley was literary editor of The Australian newspaper.

== Plays ==
- From the Desk of Eugene Flockhart (1966)
- Witzenhausen, Where Are You? (1968)
- A Lesson in English (1976)
- It's a Chocolate World
- Cullity on Furniture
- The Feet of Daniel Mannix
- Beware of Imitations
- Bedfellows (1975)
- The Ship's Whistle (1978)
- Marsupials (1979)
- Scanlan (1980)
- Beware of Imitations (1985)
- Music (2012)

== Novels ==
- A Wild Ass of a Man (1967)
- A Salute to the Great McCarthy (1970) – filmed as The Great Macarthy (1975)
- Let's Hear it for Prendergast (1971)
- Craziplane (1989)
- Don't Leave Me (2002)

== Non-fiction ==
- Minitudes: Diaries 1974-1997 (2000)
- Mug Shots: A Memoir (2013)
