= John Martin's Book =

Magazine

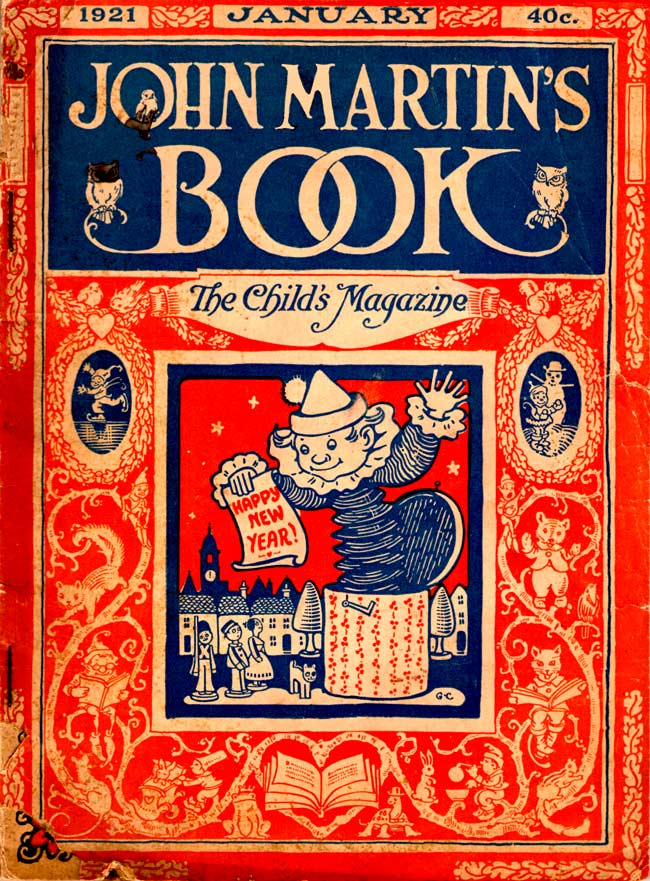
- January 1921 issue
- Editor: "John Martin"
- Categories: Children's magazine
- Circulation: 40,000 in 1925; 23,000 in 1932
- First issue: 1912
- Final issue: 1933
- Company: John Martin's House
- OCLC: 10593178

John Martin's Book was a children's magazine aimed at five- to eight-year-olds. Martin Gardner wrote that it was a "pioneering publication" and the "most entertaining magazine" aimed at this age group published in the US. Priced from 10 to 50 cents over its twenty-year run, it was primarily purchased by middle and upper income families due to its cost.

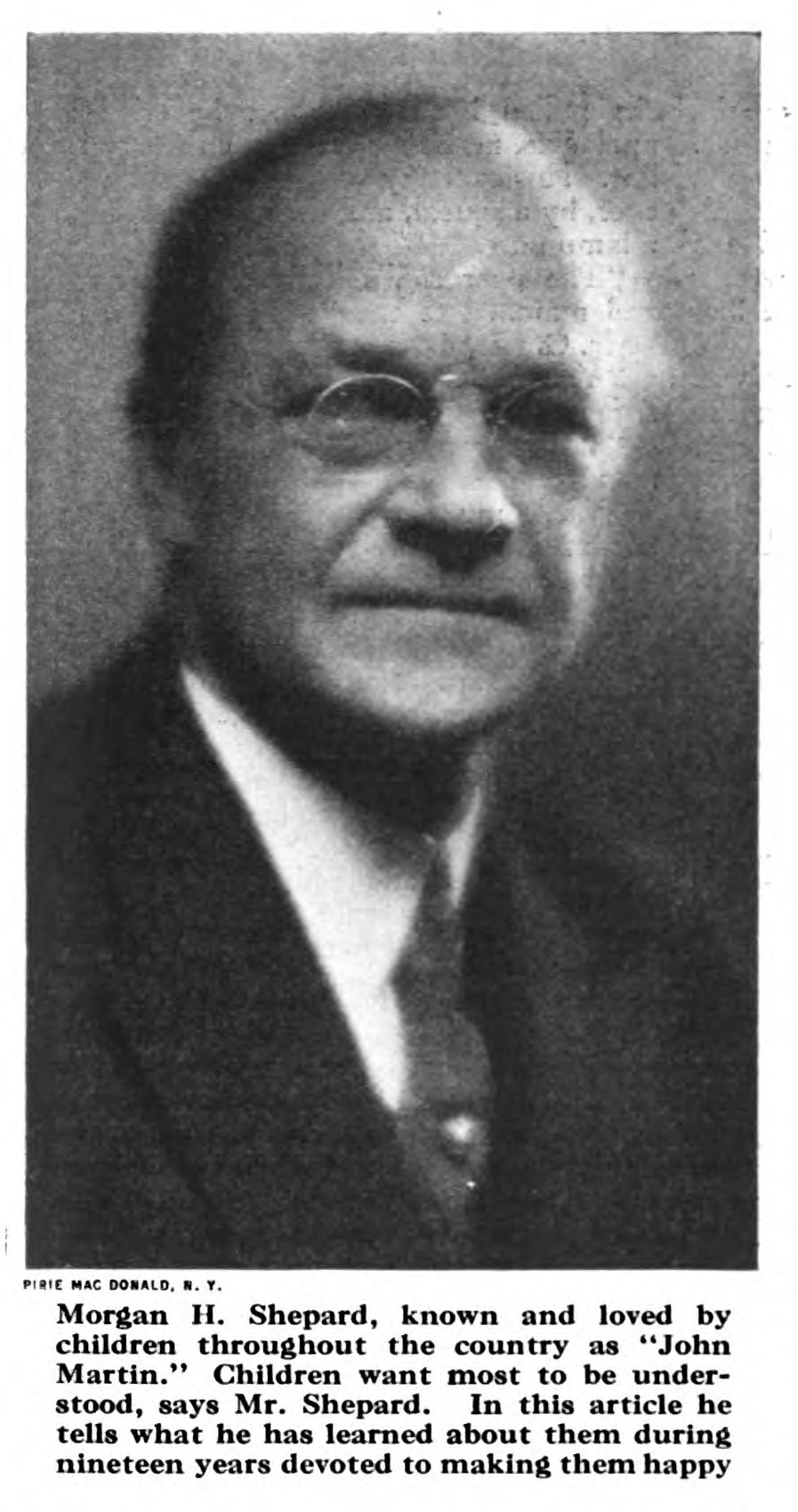
Photo of John Martin, circa 1925.

"John Martin" was the pseudonym of Morgan van Roorbach Shepard (April 8, 1865 – May 16, 1947). He was born in Brooklyn, New York but raised on a plantation in Maryland and took his name from the colony of martins that lived there. His mother died when he was nine, a crushing blow, and he was sent to a series of boarding schools where he was frequently bullied. As an adult, he claimed he was caught up in a revolution in Central America. He ended up working a variety of jobs in California, including a streetcar conductor, where he was fired for giving free rides to children, a newspaper reporter, and a bank clerk. He opened a business designing greeting cards in the Crocker Building in San Francisco, California, but it was demolished by the 1906 San Francisco earthquake and his leg was badly injured while he was trying to retrieve items from his office safe.

While recovering and bedridden he began writing children's stories and verse for publication. He began writing long, illustrated letters to children, which in 1908 became a small publication called John Martin's Letters he was mailing to 2000 children a month. In 1912, it became the magazine John Martin's Book.

The magazine was illustrated with stories, illustrations, and puzzles by cartoonist George L. Carlson. John Martin's House also published a series of hardcover John Martin Big Books reprinting material from the magazine. The magazine's puzzles were presented by a Carlson-drawn character named Peter Puzzlemaker. A collection of these puzzles was published by John Martin's House as Peter Puzzlemaker in 1922 and republished by Martin Gardner in the 1990s.

Shephard was assisted by Helen Jane Waldo (1876?–1937), who was associate editor during the entire run of the magazine. Notable writers and artists who contributed to John Martin's Book include Thornton Burgess, Conrad Richter, Grace Adele Pierce, Johnny Gruelle, Justin Gruelle, Jack Yeats, William Wallace Denslow, Frank Verbeck, and Wanda Gag. The most important contributor was illustrator George Carlson, who contributed over fifty covers and most of the puzzles, riddles, and activities to the magazine.

After the end of John Martin's Book, Shepard became juvenile director for the National Broadcasting Company.
