= Milly, Molly (TV series) =

2006 New Zealand TV series or program

- Title card
- Created by: Gill Pittar
- Written by: Clare Madsen
- Directed by: David Evans
- Creative director: Gill Pittar
- Opening theme: "Milly Molly"
- Countries of origin: New Zealand; Australia; Singapore
- Original language: English
- No. of seasons: 2
- No. of episodes: 52

Production
- Producer: Rodney Whitham
- Running time: 10 minutes
- Production companies: Milly Molly Group Holdings; Scrawl Studios; Beyond Entertainment

Original release
- Network: ABC Kids
- Release: 2006 – 2009

Milly, Molly is a New Zealand-Australian-Singaporean animated series based on the children's books of the same name. It was aired in 2006. An agreement for a second season was made in early 2008. The two young actors, Savannah Lind and Madeline Flood, worked on the TV show. The voice of Aunt Maude was Cornelia Frances. Produced for the Australian Broadcasting Corporation by Milly Molly Group Holdings, Scrawl Studios and Beyond Productions in association with the Media Development Authority of Singapore.

== Premise ==
Milly and her friend Molly have adventures which teach them life skills and values.
