= A Wild Ass of a Man =

- Based on: A Wild Ass of a Man by Barry Oakley
- Written by: Michael Boddy
- Directed by: Norman Johnson
- Starring: Max Gillies; Cornelia Frances
- Country of origin: Australia
- Original language: English

Production
- Executive producer: Oscar Whitbread
- Running time: 70 mins
- Production company: ABC

Original release
- Network: ABC
- Release: 1980

A Wild Ass of a Man is a 1980 Australian film directed by Norman Johnson and starring Max Gillies and Cornelia Frances. It is based on the 1967 novel by Barry Oakley about a school teacher.
