= Milly, Molly =

Children's book series by Gill Pittar

- Author: Gill Pittar
- Illustrator: Cris Morrell
- Country: New Zealand
- Language: English; Māori
- Publisher: Milly Molly Books / MM House Publishing
- Published: 2000-present

Milly, Molly is a series of New Zealand children's books by Gill Pittar. It is about the adventures of two little girls from different ethnic backgrounds, and the books promote the acceptance of diversity and the learning of life skills. There is an animated television series based on the books.

== Background ==
The books were inspired by a double-ended doll created in 1995 by Gill Pittar to promote tolerance and communication. Following the success of the dolls, she began writing books about the characters with the first book published in 2000.

Milly, Molly books have since been translated into 40 languages.

== Characters ==
- Milly Mandara (voiced by Madeleine Flood) is a young girl who is best friends with Molly Horren.
- Molly Horren (voiced by Savannah Lind) is a young girl who is best friends with Milly Mandara.
- Tom is a classmate who plays in the school soccer team and he is best friends with Jack.
- Alfred(or simply just Alf) is a new boy from a different country (most likely Germany). Humphrey did not get along with him at first, but they become best friends after Alf comforted him by teaching him a lesson about individuality.
- Sophie is a girl who loves chocolate and is best friends with Elizabeth Smith.
- Elizabeth is a girl who has very neat writing and is best friends with Sophie Da Lize.
- Meg is a girl who likes apples, as seen in Beefy, and is meticulous, as seen in Jungle Gym.
- Harry is a boy who has two pet mice called Brian and Brioni. Brian and Brioni had a litter of nine baby mice in "Harry's Mouse".
- Humphrey is a boy who often teases Milly and Molly. He likes robots, dinosaurs and outer space. He has a doberman called "Zoltan" who he speaks in "Martian" too.
- George is a boy who likes oranges and has a pet skunk named Stinky.
- Junior Joe(or simply just Joe) is a boy who has a pet hermit crab.
- Chloe is a snobby girl who has a pet horse named Prince.
- Ellie is a blind girl who befriends Milly and Molly. She only appeared in one episode.
- B.B Brown is a boy who appeared in only one episode. Milly Mandara and Molly Horren changed his thieving way.
- Heidi Untidy is a girl who is always untidy. She only appeared in one episode. The girls (Milly and Molly) cleaned her room with her and Heidi Untidy is very cool with a bright imagination.
- Family- Lee Mandara (Milly's father): he does not really like Marmalade as much as Milly does.
- Orla Mandara (Milly's mother): She tries to reconcile Marmalade and Milly's father.
- Tom Horren (Molly's father): He loves yoga.
- Katie Horren (Molly's mother): She does not like mice.

== TV adaptation ==
Milly, Molly, a Singapore-New Zealand co-produced animated TV series based on the books, was produced in 2006. An agreement for a second season was made in early 2009. The two young actors, Savannah Lind and Madeline Flood, worked on the TV show. The voice of Aunt Maude was Cornelia Frances. Produced for the Australian Broadcasting Corporation by Milly Molly Group Holdings, Scrawl Studios and Beyond Productions in association with the Media Development Authority of Singapore.
