= BBC Science Focus =

British monthly magazine

- Cover of the October 2024 issue
- Editor: Daniel Bennett
- Categories: Science and Technology
- Frequency: Monthly
- Circulation: 50,142 (2021); Print and digital editions
- First issue: December 1992
- Company: Our Media
- Country: United Kingdom
- Based in: Bristol
- Language: English
- Website: Science Focus
- ISSN: 0966-4270

BBC Science Focus (previously BBC Focus) is a British monthly magazine about science and technology published in Bristol, UK by Our Media. Edited by Daniel Bennett, it covers all aspects of science and technology and is written for general readers as well as people with a knowledge of science. Formerly known as Focus and published by Gruner + Jahr and Nat Mags, the magazine was taken over by BBC Magazines in mid-2005 and renamed BBC Focus. Our Media took over from BBC successor Immediate Media Company in 2023. There are also regular science celebrity features and interviews. Their official website is known as Science Focus.

== Regular features ==
- Intro: a few paragraphs from the editor
- Eye Opener: interesting or amazing photography
- Letters to the editor
- Discoveries: news articles about the world of science
- Features (main topics)
- Q&A: a section welcoming science queries from readers and answers from an expert panel
- Out There: a round-up of the latest factual books, films, television and radio, exhibitions and events
- Innovations: news and reviews from the world of technology
