= Herschel V. Jones =

American publisher and collector

Herschel V. Jones (August 30, 1861 – May 24, 1928) was a publisher of the Minneapolis Journal (now the Star Tribune) for twenty years as well as a noted book collector. He is best known for his collection of Americana.

Jones' personal philosophy was that "credit, based on character and integrity" was more important than available cash. With it, he went from being a farm-boy who dropped out of school to become a publisher and editor, patron of literature and the arts, and collector of Americana.

== Journalist and publisher ==
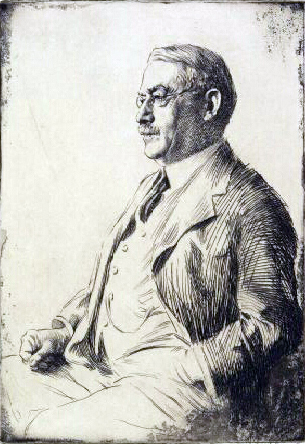
Herschel V. Jones (1861–1928)

Jones' career in journalism started early. At fifteen, he began to work on the staff of the Jefferson Courier (in Jefferson, Schoharie County, N.Y.) where he was born and raised. At eighteen he bought the paper for $700. In 1885, when he was 24, he sold the Jefferson Courier at a profit of $700 and went to Minneapolis as a reporter on the Minneapolis Journal.

In 1890 he started a market and crop report service for the Journal. Two notable predictions, one of heavy crops in 1900 and one of wheat-rust losses in 1904, gave him a national reputation. In 1901 he founded The Commercial West, a financial and grain news weekly. In 1908 he bought the Minneapolis Journal for $1,200,000 (with only $25,000 in assets of his own.) He remained connected to the Minneapolis Journal for the rest of his life.

He was one of the directors of the Associated Press for a number of years.

== Book collector ==
Jones is remembered more as a book-collector than as a journalist. Over his lifetime he amassed four significant book collections. His first collection of about 600 first editions of modern authors was started with the purchase of a first edition of Robert Browning's Inn Album. It has been described as one of the early first-edition collections, and was eventually sold.

His second collection of about 2,000 volumes of early English poetry and drama was notable in that it sold at auction in New York in 1918-19 for about $400,000. (The New York Times claimed this number was $391,854.)

His third collection was of Elizabethan items. It was sold in 1923 for $137,865.

== Adventures in Americana ==
His last collection of early Americana was the most remarkable. The collection of 1,700 volumes, primarily first editions, covered 400 years of American history dating back to Columbus. Before his death, Jones supervised the publication of a two-volume catalog of about 300 of the most valuable of these books, which was titled Adventures in Americana, 1492-1897: The Romance of Voyage and Discovery.

As an example of this last collection, for the period from 1492 to 1608, Jones had three of the printed Letters of Christopher Columbus (from the late 15th Century) and three of the printed Letters of Amerigo Vespucci printed in 1503 and 1504. Also in the collection was a copy of Cosmographiae Introductio printed in 1507, which is the booklet written to accompany the first map to suggest that the new continent be called America. He also had a copy of Globus Mundi, printed in 1509, which was the first book in which the name America was really adopted.

According to the New York Times, it was through his friendship with Theodore Roosevelt, whom he met while covering the 1900 presidential campaign, that Jones developed an interest in American literature.

== Art collector and benefactor ==
Jones was also a trustee and benefactor of the Minneapolis Institute of Arts, to which he gave a collection of 5,300 prints. (The New York Times claims there were 5,852 prints valued at $700,000.)

From 1914 to 1917 he sponsored Minnesota artist Wanda Gág's instruction at the Minneapolis School of Art.

In 1920, Jones sold his collection of modern etchings and started to collect etchings by old masters, including Rembrandt's Lucretia, and El Greco's Portrait of a Nobleman, which he bought in 1926 for $75,000.

Jones was buried in Lakewood Cemetery. In his estate, he left trust funds to the Minnesota Historical Society and the library of the University of Minnesota.

== Herschel V. Jones Collection ==
"Herschel V. Jones (1861–1928) anonymously donated more than 5,300 prints to the MIA in 1916, establishing one of the first public print departments in the country. These prints were from the Ladd Collection, which Jones purchased that same year. The Ladd Collection, formed during a thirty-year period by William M. Ladd of Portland, Oregon, contained woodcuts, engravings, etchings, and lithographs tracing the history of graphic arts. To supplement the Ladd Collection, Jones purchased rare and esoteric works that are virtually unattainable today, such as Dürer's Saint Jerome in His Study and an extremely rare hand-colored woodcut, c. 1465, by Firabet of Rapperswil. What came to be known as the Herschel V. Jones Collection is, to this day, the heart of the MIA's prints and drawings collection and still is the largest gift of artwork ever donated to the MIA."

== Other resources ==
- AE Monthly August Edition at www.americanaexchange.com
- Finn-Olaf Jones, 12.12.05 (2005-12-12). "My Father's Library". Forbes. Archived from the original on 2007-09-14.
- Checklist of the Library of H.V. Jones (Originally published in 1928)
- H. V. Jones: A Newspaperman's Imprint on Minneapolis History by John J. Koblas
- John J. Koblas (January 2003). H.V. Jones: A Newspaperman's Imprint on Minneapolis History. North Star Press. ISBN 0-87839-191-6.
- "ART NOTES.; Herschel V. Jones Collection of Modern Etchings on View" (pdf). New York Times. March 22, 1921.
- Michaux, Lisa Dickinson, et al. Herschel V. Jones : The Imprint of a Great Collector. Minneapolis Institute of Arts, 2006.
