= Nothing at All (children's book) =

1941 Picture book

- Author: Wanda Gag
- Publisher: Coward McCann
- Publication date: 1941
- Pages: 32 unnumbered pages
- Awards: Caldecott Honor
- ISBN: 978-0-8166-9636-9; 2004 reprint
- OCLC: 1151001151

Nothing at All is a 1941 picture book by Wanda Gag. The story is about an invisible dog named Nothing at All and his attempts to turn visible. The book was a recipient of a 1942 Caldecott Honor for its illustrations.
