= George L. Carlson =

George Leonard Carlson (1887 - September 26, 1962) was an illustrator and artist with numerous completed works, perhaps the most famous being the dust jacket for Gone with the Wind. He is cited by Harlan Ellison as a "cartoonist of the absurd, on a par with Winsor McCay, Geo. McManus, Rube Goldberg or Bill Holman." Comic book scholar Michael Barrier called him "a kind of George Herriman for little children". In the Harlan Ellison Hornbook preface to his essay on Carlson, Ellison relates how he contacted Carlson's daughters and attempted to get the material they sent him preserved in a museum or archive, to no avail. According to Paul Tumey of Fantagraphics, Carlson's book Draw Comics! Here's How - A Complete Book on Cartooning (Whitman, 1933) was included in an exhibit on Art Spiegelman in the Museum of Contemporary Art Detroit in 2009.

Two episodes of "The Pie-Face Prince of Old Pretzelburg" (from Jingle Jangle Comics 5 and 24) are included in A Smithsonian Book of Comic-book Comics ed. by J. Michael Barrier and Martin T. Williams. Another "Pie-Face Prince" episode is reprinted in The Toon Treasury of Classic Children's Comics, ed. by Art Spiegelman. "The Zheckered Zultan and His Three Little Zulteens" appears in The Golden Collection of Klassic Krazy Kool Kids Komics, ed. by historian Craig Yoe.

In October 2013, a two-part article on Carlson's career appeared in The Comics Journal. Calling Carlson "an under-appreciated, largely overlooked cartoonist, illustrator, game designer, and graphic artist extraordinaire" with a "playful, surreal world", writer Paul Tumey examined Carlson's life and work and announced the publication of Perfect Nonsense: The Chaotic Comics and Goofy Games of George Carlson by Daniel Yezbick (Fantagraphics, December 2013). The article references Ellison's essay and another he wrote for a 1990 Carlson tribute comic book published by Innovation, Mangle Tangle Tales #1. It also includes an extensive bibliography of Carlson's work.

A more scholarly analysis appears in Daniel Yezbick's 2007 "Riddles of Engagement: Narrative Play in the Children's Media and Comic Art of George Carlson".

== Timeline of creative works ==
- 1917 - Illustrates The Magic Stone: Rainbow Fairy Stories with paintings
- 1917 - Cover illustration for Judge Magazine, July 14, 1917
- 1920 - Illustrates Swiss Fairy Tales by William Elliot Griffis
- 1920 - Illustrates Jane and the Owl by Gene Stone
- 1921 - Illustrates Adventures of Jane by Gene Stone
- 1928 - Illustrates The Adventures of Toby Spaniel
- 1929 - Creates a dust jacket for The Whirlwind
- 1931 - Provides black and white ink drawings and full color frontis for Fact and Story Reader - book eight
- 1933 - Authored Draw Comics! - Here's How - A Complete Book on Cartooning
- 1936 - Illustrated the original yellow dust jacket for Gone with the Wind
- 1937 - Writes and Illustrates Fun-Time Games, Puzzles, Stunts, Drawings, also Fun For Juniors, and also Points on Cartooning.
- 1939 - Illustrates "Uncle Wiggily and His Friends" by Howard R. Garis
- 1940 - Cover illustration for "Treasure Chest of Stephen Foster Songs"
- 1942 - Begins work with Jingle Jangle Comics at its birth, creating covers and contributing comic strips such as "The Pie-Face Prince of Old Pretzelburg", contributed for 8 years every other month, two strips per contributed issue.
- 1949 - Creates 1001 Riddles for Children
- 1953 - Creates book I Can Draw for young artists
- 1955 - Creates Funtime Crossword Puzzles for juniors
- 1959 - Creates book Jokes & Riddles for young children

== Sources ==
- George L Carlson on Askart.com
- George Carlson at Toonopedia
