= Snow White and the Seven Dwarfs (book) =

1938 picture book

Snow White And The Seven Dwarfs
- Author: Wanda Gag
- Illustrator: Wanda Gag
- Genre: children's books picture books
- Publisher: Coward-McCann Books
- Publication date: 1938
- ISBN: 0-571-06496-5

Snow White and the Seven Dwarfs is a 1938 picture book written and illustrated by Wanda Gág and published by Coward-McCann. Snow White and the Seven Dwarfs was a Caldecott Medal Honor Book in 1939. The book is a twist on the classic tale of Snow White by the Brothers Grimm. Since then it has been republished several times, including in 1999, 2004, and 2013.

== Background ==
After the success of Walt Disney's film Snow White and the Seven Dwarfs, author Anne Carroll Moore suggested that Gág retell the story of Snow White in a manner more faithful to the original Brothers Grimm story. Gag translated the text from the German and designed the illustrations.

== Book Details ==
The book is printed in white and black. The cover depicts a young girl with black hair looking out the window of a small red house.

== Description ==
A queen, used to being "the fairest one of all", is turned green with envy when her magic mirror says that her seven-year-old stepdaughter, Snow White, is now the fairest one of all. With fury the queen demands a huntsman to take Snow White into the woods, kill her, and bring back a token as proof of her death. Once in the woods, Snow White pleads with the huntsmen not to hurt her, assuring him that she'll run away and never return. The huntsman agrees and brings a wild boar heart to the queen as a token. Snow White runs until she discovers a small wooden hut, inside of which are found objects in centuplicate. Snow White falls asleep on one of the little beds and is later awoken by seven dwarfs. They agree to let her stay if she becomes their house keeper.

Later, when the evil queen asks her magic mirror, "Mirror, Mirror, on the wall, Who's the fairest one of all?" the mirror answers "Thou art very fair, Oh Queen, But the fairest ever seen Dwells within the wooded glen With the seven little men." Angered, the queen dresses in rags and paints her face to conceal her identity. She travels to the glen and convinces Snow White to eat an apple that she has secretly poisoned, despite protestations from the dwarfs. Snow White is poisoned and appears to die; the dwarfs fashion a glass casket and place her inside.

Years pass by, and one day a young prince walking through the forest spots Snow White in the casket. He begs the dwarfs to let him take her to the castle, after much pleading they agree. On the way to the castle, the men rock the casket and a piece of the apple is dislodged from Snow White's throat and she revives. Snow White, her prince, and the seven dwarfs live happily ever after.

== Critical reception ==
Publishers Weekly described the book as "a stunning version of the Grimms' classic story". Books Links found that "the pen-and-ink drawings are treasures, loaded with details" and that "inventive compositions and an asymmetrical picture shape are key features in Gág’s works".
