= Daniel Bennett (journalist) =

British science writer

- Education: City, University of London
- Employer: BBC Science Focus

Daniel Bennett is a British science writer who is editor of BBC Science Focus. In 2022, Bennett was named by the British Society of Magazine Editors as Editor of the Year in Science, Technology and Environment.

== Early life and education ==
Bennett was an undergraduate student in psychology at City, University of London. He remained at City university for a master's degree in journalism. After graduating Bennett worked for T3 and Total Video Games.

== Career ==
In 2016, Bennett joined BBC Focus as an editor. He oversaw the re-branding of BBC Focus to BBC Science Focus in 2019. In 2022, his efforts on BBC Science Focus were recognised by the British Society of Magazine Editors. The citation described how he "provided an Editor’s masterclass in how to pivot a print team to work across multiple platforms, providing them with the necessary training and tools to succeed. Impressive print circulation and digital traffic figures attest to the success of his strategy. The judges also love the way BBC Science Focus continues to communicate science in such an inclusive and entertaining way”.

== Awards and honours ==
- 2019 British Society of Magazine Editors Editor of the Year in Science, Technology and Environment
- 2022 British Society of Magazine Editors Editor of the Year in Science, Technology and Environment
