= Millions of Cats =

1928 children's picture book by Wanda Gág

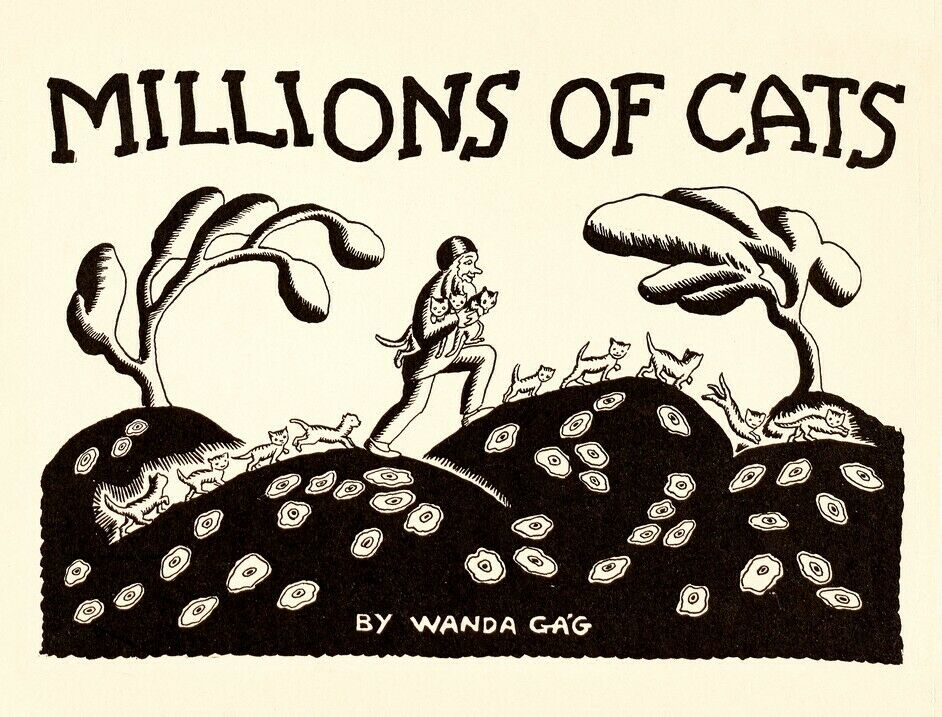
- First edition
- Author: Wanda Gág
- Illustrator: Wanda Gág
- Cover artist: Wanda Gág
- Language: English
- Series: None
- Genre: Children's literature
- Publisher: Coward-McCann
- Publication date: 1928
- Publication place: United States
- Media type: Print
- Pages: 32
- ISBN: 0-698-20091-8
- OCLC: 178993
- Preceded by: N/A
- Followed by: The Funny Thing
- Text: Millions of Cats at Wikisource

Millions of Cats is a children's picture book written and illustrated by Wanda Gág in 1928. The book won a Newbery Honor award in 1929, one of the few picture books to do so. Millions of Cats is the oldest American picture book still in print. It entered the public domain in the United States on January 1st, 2024.

== Plot ==
The hand-lettered text, done by the author's brother, tells the story of an elderly couple who live comfortably, but realize that they are very lonely. The wife wants a cat to love, so her husband sets off in search of a beautiful one to bring home to her. After travelling far away from home, he finds a hillside covered in "cats here, cats there, Cats and kittens everywhere. Hundreds of cats, thousands of cats, Millions and billions and trillions of cats..." This rhythmic phrase is repeated several other times throughout the story.

The old man is delighted, but he has difficulty deciding which of the cats to take home. He initially chooses a cat that is all-white, but then he spots a tuxedo cat, and he opts to take that one as well. Then, he spots an all-grey cat, an all-black cat, and a yellow-brown striped cat, and opts to take them as well. Each time he starts to leave, he spots another cat that he deems too beautiful to leave behind, until eventually, he ends up deciding to take all of the cats with him, and he starts home. Along the way, the cats grow thirsty, so the old man stops at a pond. Each cat takes a sip of water, and the pond is dried up. Soon afterwards, the cats grow hungry, so the old man stops at a grassy hill. Each cat takes a bite of grass, and the hill is left barren.

Finally, the old man arrives home, with his parade of cats. His wife is shocked to see that he has brought so many cats with him, rather than just one, immediately realizing what her husband overlooked: there is no way they will ever be able to feed and care for all of these cats. The old man and woman opt to let the cats decide which one of them they should keep, and they ask "Which one of you is the prettiest?" This question incites an argument from the cats over which one of them is the prettiest, and it then escalates into a major catfight, frightening the old man and woman, who retreat back into the house.

Soon, all is quiet outside. The old man and woman venture out, but now, they do not see any cats. They sadly conclude that the cats have eaten each other up in their jealous fury. Then, the old man notices one skinny cat hiding in a patch of tall grass. Apparently, it did not consider itself pretty, and thus was not involved in the catfight that killed all the other cats. The couple takes the cat into their home, feed it and bathe it, watching it grow sleek and beautiful as the days pass. They eventually determine that this was the prettiest one of all the cats, and thus the perfect cat and companion for them.

== Legacy ==
Wanda Gág pioneered the double-page spread in this book. Writer and reviewer Anita Silvey explained, "She used both pages to move the story forward, putting them together with art that sweeps across the entire page spread: her favorite illustration fell in the center of the book - with the old man carrying cats against the rolling hills." This book remains popular with children, parents, and critics alike. In 1001 Children's Books You Must Read Before You Grow Up, Kaylee Davis calls the book an "enchanting tale", and says "Gag's charming, folk-art style, simple black-and-white illustrations, lyrical language, and catchy refrain that children will happily repeat with each reading, make this a family favorite."

== Adaptations ==
The book was adapted into an episode of Shelley Duvall's Bedtime Stories (Season 1) in 1992, narrated by James Earl Jones.
