= Dan Bennett =

American comedian and juggler

Dan Bennett is an American comedian and juggler who has been on numerous TV shows as well as in TV commercials in the U.S. He currently resides in Arizona and performs Corporate Entertainment for clients such as McDonald's, Coca-Cola, Novell, Quaker Oats, and Nu Skin. He specializes in a focused mix of physical comedy that is applied to the business terms and problems of his corporate clients. Dan Bennett has a doctorate in Mathematics and was a calculus instructor for a time.

== TV appearances ==
Dan has appeared on The Tonight Show with Jay Leno, The Arsenio Hall Show, Good Morning America, and PM Magazine.

== Awards ==
Dan Bennett won three Numbers Challenges at the International Jugglers' Association Championships in 1984 and 1985. He was listed in the Guinness Book of World Records 1990 as a 10 bean bag juggler.
