= List of Australian films of 1983 =

The following is a list of Australian films of 1983.

| Title | Director | Cast | Genre | Notes |
|---|---|---|---|---|
| Abra Cadabra | Alex Stitt | Voices: John Farnham, Jacki Weaver, Hayes Gordon | Animation | IMDb |
| Allies | Marian Wilkinson | | Documentary | IMDb |
| BMX Bandits | Brian Trenchard-Smith | David Argue, John Ley, Bryan Marshall, Angelo D'Angelo, Nicole Kidman, James Lugton | Action / Drama Feature film | IMDb |
| The Body Corporate | Eric Taylor | Leonard Teale, Pat McDonald, Mervyn Drake, Michael Carman, Claire Crowther, Jeanie Drynan, Ron Hackett, Betty Lucas | Drama ABC TV film | |
| Buddies | Arch Nicholson | Colin Friels, Kris McQuade, Harold Hopkins, Bruce Spence, Norman Kaye, Simon Chilvers, Lisa Peers, Dennis Miller | Comedy / Drama Feature film | IMDB, AFI Award, Best Original Screenplay for John Dingwall |
| Bush Christmas | Henri Safran | John Howard, John Ewart, Peter Sumner, Manalpuy, Nicole Kidman, James Wingrove, Mark Spain | Drama Family Feature film | IMDb |
| Careful, He Might Hear You | Carl Schultz | Wendy Hughes, Robyn Nevin, John Hargreaves, Nicholas Gledhill, Geraldine Turner, Isabelle Anderson, Peter Whitford, Colleen Clifford, Peter Whitford | Drama Feature film | IMDb |
| Chase Through the Night | Howard Rubie | Ron Blanchard, Brett Climo, John Jarratt, Scott McGregor, Nicole Kidman, Paul Sonkkila, Lyn Collingwood, Roger Cox, Steve Dodd, Justine Saunders, Alan Dargin, Jeff Truman | Adventure / Drama / Family ABC TV film | |
| The Dean Case | Kevin Dobson | Lewis Fitz-Gerald, Ivar Kants, Lola Brooks, Alexander Archdale, Celia de Burgh | Drama ABC TV film | Based on Verdict series |
| Desert Farming | Ivor Bowen | | Documentary | IMDb |
| The Disappearance of Azaria Chamberlain | Michael Thornhill | John Hamblin, Elaine Hudson, Max Phipps, Peter Carroll, John Clayton, Tony Barry, Ray Meagher, Jim Holt | Drama TV film | aka Who Killed Baby Azaria (International title) |
| Douglas Mawson: The Survivor | David Parer | | Drama | IMDb, Melbourne International Film Festival 1983 |
| Dusty | John Richardson | Bill Kerr, Noel Trevarthen, Carol Burns | Drama | IMDb |
| Fight to the Death | Wang Lee | Chang Li, Bruce Tse, Ron van Clief | War | IMDb |
| First Contact | Bob Connolly | Richard Oxenburgh, Daniel Leahy, Mick Leahy | Documentary | IMDb |
| For Love or Money | Megan McMurchy & Jeni Thornley | Noni Hazlehurst, narrator | Documentary | IMDb |
| Going Down | Haydn Keenan | Tracy Mann, Vera Plevnik, Julie Barry | Drama | IMDb |
| Goodbye Paradise | Carl Schultz | Ray Barrett, Paul Chubb, Guy Doleman, Robyn Nevin, Don Pascoe | Drama | IMDb |
| Hostage | Frank Shields | Kerry Mack, Ralph Schicha, Gabrielle Barraket, Judy Nunn, Henk Johanne, Doris Goddard, Clare Binney | Drama / Thriller Feature film | IMDb, aka "Savage Attraction"; Co-production with West Germany |
| Man of Flowers | Paul Cox | Norman Kaye, Alyson Best, Chris Haywood, Sarah Walker, Julia Blake, Tony Llewellyn-Jones, Bob Ellis | Drama Feature film | IMDb, Screened at the 1984 Cannes Film Festival |
| Midnite Spares | Quentin Masters | James Laurie, Gia Carides, Max Cullen, Bruce Spence, Graeme Blundell, David Argue, Jonathan Coleman | Action / Comedy | IMDb |
| Molly | Ned Lander | Claudia Karvan, Garry McDonald, Ruth Cracknell, Les Dayman, Reg Lye, Melissa Jaffer, Lucky Grills, Slim de Grey, Molly, Mercia Deane-Johns, Joy Hruby | Drama / Family Feature film | IMDb |
| Moving Out | Michael Pattinson | Vince Colosimo, Maurice Devincentis, Tibor Gyapjas | Drama | IMDb |
| Now and Forever | Adrian Carr | Cheryl Ladd, Robert Coleby, Carmen Duncan | Drama / Romance | IMDb |
| Passionless Moments | Jane Campion | David Benton, Ann Burriman | Short | IMDb, Screened at the 1986 Cannes Film Festival |
| Phar Lap | Simon Wincer | Tom Burlinson, Martin Vaughan, Ron Leibman, Judy Morris, John Stanton, Peter Whitford, Celia de Burgh, Les Foxcroft, Vincent Ball, Georgia Carr | Drama Feature film | IMDb |
| Platypus Cove | Peter Maxwell | Tony Barry, Carmen Duncan, Paul Smith, Bill Kerr, Henri Szeps, Martin Lewis, Simone Buchanan, Aileen Britton, Mark Hembrow, John Ley, Dennis Miller | Adventure / Family ABC TV film | IMDb |
| The Return of Captain Invincible | Philippe Mora | Alan Arkin, Christopher Lee, Kate Fitzpatrick | Musical / Fantasy / Comedy | IMDb |
| The Schippan Mystery | Di Drew | Sally McKenzie, Joseph Fürst, Dorothy Alison, Desiree Smith, Michael Winchester, Arthur Dignam, Brandon Burke, Yves Stening, Martin Vaughan | Drama ABC TV film | Based on Verdict series. |
| Sherlock Holmes and the Baskerville Curse | | Narrated by Peter O'Toole, Ron Haddrick, Earle Cross | Animation | IMDb |
| A Slice of Life | John D. Lamond | Robin Nedwell, John Ewart, Juliet Jordan | Comedy | IMDb |
| Stanley: Every Home Should Have One | Esben Storm | Peter Bensley, Graham Kennedy, Nell Campbell, Michael Craig, Susan Walker, Joy Smithers, David Argue, Max Cullen, Lorna Lesley, Leonard Teale, Harold Hopkins, Willie Fennell, Jon Ewing | Comedy / Romance Feature film | aka Stanley |
| Stations | Jackie McKimmie | Noni Hazlehurst, Tim Burns, Elaine Cusick | Short | IMDb |
| Tukana – husat i asua? | Chris Owen, Albert Toro | Albert Toro, Regina Talsa, Wenceslas Noruke | Comedy / Drama | IMDb |
| Undercover | David Stevens | Michael Pare, Genevieve Picot, John Walton, Sandy Gore, Peter Phelps, Barry Otto, Caz Lederman, Wallas Eaton, Nicholas Eadie, Ian Gilmour, Slim de Grey, Julie Nihill, Greig Pickhaver | Comedy / Drama Feature film | IMDb, 6 AFI nominations |
| The Weekly's War | Stephen Ramsey | Noni Hazlehurst, Jane Harders, Michael Caton, Jacqueline Kott, Pat Thomson, Patricia Kennedy, Judi Farr, Peter Fisher, Bill Hunter, Ray Meagher | Drama TV film | |
| The Wild Duck | Henri Safran | Liv Ullmann, Jeremy Irons, Lucinda Jones, John Meillon, Arthur Dignam, Rhys McConnochie, Colin Croft, Marion Edward, Peter de Salis, Jeff Truman, Michael Pate | Drama / Historical Feature film | IMDb |
| The Winds of Jarrah | Mark Egerton | Terence Donovan, Susan Lyons, Harold Hopkins, Steve Bisley, Martin Vaughan, Isabelle Anderson, Steven Grives, Dorothy Alison, Les Foxcroft, Emil Minty | Drama / Romance Feature film | IMDb |
| The Voyage of Bounty's Child | Michael Edols | narrated by Leo McKern | Documentary / Biography | IMDb |

== See also ==
- 1983 in Australia
- 1983 in Australian television
