= 1982 in Australian television =

== Events ==
=== Television ===
- 2 January - Nine Network's popular soap opera, The Young Doctors, makes it UK television debut, on the newly formed, Central Independent Television network, which began broadcasting to the Midlands the previous day. The franchise was previously held by ATV. Thirteen of the fourteen ITV companies eventually ran the series during the afternoon, the most common slot was Monday and Tuesday at 15:30-16:00, although some initially broadcast it early evening at 17:15-17:45 before moving the series to daytime.
- 11 January - American police drama series Hill Street Blues debuts on the Nine Network.
- 18 January - Australian soap opera Sons and Daughters premieres on the Seven Network.
- February - Rupert Murdoch’s Network Ten makes a successful $9.2m bid for the rights to televise the 1984 Olympic Games from Los Angeles. Ten was up against a Seven Network bid and a joint Nine Network-ABC bid.
- 1 March - British children's animated series Doctor Snuggles premieres on the ABC at 4:30pm airing for the most part throughout the whole year.
- 7 April - British children's animated series Danger Mouse makes its first screening on ABC in Sydney and some other states in Australia. It would later air in Victoria in 1983.
- 10 June - Australian mini-series Sara Dane based on the bestselling 1954 novel by the late Irish Australian romance fiction novelist Catherine Gaskin debuts on Network Ten.
- 28 June - The Nine Network introduces its new breakfast TV show, National News Today, This was used for a few weeks before it was later shortened the title to "Today".
- 1 July - The ABC celebrates its 50th anniversary starting with a special called From Carbon Mikes to Satellites followed by Quiros, a music drama written specifically for the occasion and broadcast across both ABC television and FM radio.
- July - The Mike Walsh Show celebrates its 2000th episode on Nine Network.
- September - The Nine Network and ABC jointly televise the 1982 Commonwealth Games from Brisbane.
- 25 September - The VFL Grand Final is televised on Seven Network.
- 24 October – The 1977 film Star Wars directed by George Lucas premieres on Network Ten.
- 25 October - Seven's rural drama serial, A Country Practice, begins airing on seven regional ITV companies in the UK. Over the next 17 years, each of the fourteen ITV contractors would run the series at their own regional pace, and screened later episodes in a half-hour edited format.
- 13 December - The ABC premieres Faces of Change, an all new six episode program that studies women's changing roles in Australian society.
- Nine, Seven and the ABC conduct stereo test transmissions.
- Former Network Ten reporter Jana Wendt joins Nine Network's 60 Minutes team as its first female reporter.
- The Australian Children's Television Foundation (aka ACTF) a national non-profit children's media production and policy hub that helps develop children's television policy; distributes and pays for Australian children's television series; supports new children's media; and develops screen resources for the education sector is launched. The hub is also best known for making well known Australian television shows for children such as Round the Twist, Kaboodle and Worst Best Friends.

=== Debuts ===
- 18 January - Sons and Daughters (Seven Network) (1982-1987)
- 23 February - Rock Arena (ABC TV) (1982-1989)
- 27 February - The Simon Gallaher Show (ABC TV) (1982-1983)
- 11 March - Come Midnight Monday (ABC TV) (1982)
- 31 March - Watch This Space (ABC TV) (1982)
- 10 June - Sara Dane (Network Ten) (1982)
- 28 June - Today (Nine Network) (1982–present)
- 27 June - Taurus Rising (Nine Network) (1982)
- 27 June - 1915 (ABC TV) (1982)
- 30 June - Silly Season Cinema (ABC TV) (1982-1989)
- 13 December - Faces of Change (ABC TV) (1982)
- Aerobics Oz Style (Network Ten)

=== New international programming ===
- 6 January - (United States) The Martian Chronicles (6 January: Network Ten - Melbourne)
- 11 January - (United States) Hill Street Blues (Nine Network)
- 14 January - (Socialist Federal Republic of Yugoslavia) Jelenko (Network 0/28)
- 25 January - (United States) The Greatest American Hero (Network Ten)
- 25 January - (United States) Dynasty (Nine Network)
- 2 February - (United Kingdom) Ski Sunday (Nine Network)
- 16 February - (United States) The Fall Guy (Nine Network)
- 1 March - (United Kingdom) Doctor Snuggles (ABC TV)
- 1 March - (United States) The New Adventures of Flash Gordon (ABC TV)
- 1 March - (United Kingdom) Animals in Action (ABC TV)
- 2 March - (United Kingdom) Drake's Venture (ABC TV)
- 7 April - (United Kingdom) Danger Mouse (ABC TV)
- 5 May - (United Kingdom) Shelley (ABC TV)
- 5 May - (United Kingdom) Private Schulz (ABC TV)
- 9 May - (United States) Dennis the Menace in Mayday for Mother (Seven Network)
- 11 May - (United Kingdom) The Day of the Triffids (ABC TV)
- 28 May - (United Kingdom) Break in the Sun (ABC TV)
- 29 May - (United States) / (Belgium) The Smurfs (Seven Network)
- 2 June - (United States) Cosmos: A Personal Voyage (ABC TV)
- 7 June - (United Kingdom) A Fine Romance (1981) (ABC TV)
- 25 June - (United Kingdom) / (United States) The Lion, the Witch and the Wardrobe (ABC TV)
- 1 July - (United States) McClain's Law (Seven Network)
- 2 August - (United States) Thundarr the Barbarian (Network Ten)
- 18 August - (United States) Mr. Merlin (Nine Network)
- 1 September - (United Kingdom) Into the Labyrinth (ABC TV)
- 24 September - (United States) Best of the West (Seven Network)
- 27 September - (United States) Trollkins (Seven Network)
- 17 October - (United Kingdom) Bird of Prey (ABC TV)
- 14 November - (United States) Private Benjamin (Network Ten)
- 16 November - (United States) Love, Sidney (Network Ten)
- 21 November - (United States) Falcon Crest (Seven Network)
- 21 November - (United Kingdom) Kessler (ABC TV)
- 22 November - (United States) Riker (Nine Network)
- 7 December - (Canada) Flappers (Network Ten)
- 7 December - (United Kingdom) Great Expectations (1981) (ABC TV)
- 21 December - (United States) Jessica Novak (Nine Network)
- 27 December - (United States) Walking Tall (Nine Network)

=== Changes to network affiliation ===
This is a list of programs which made their premiere on an Australian television network that had previously premiered on another Australian television network. The networks involved in the switch of allegiances are predominantly both free-to-air networks or both subscription television networks. Programs that have their free-to-air/subscription television premiere, after previously premiering on the opposite platform (free-to air to subscription/subscription to free-to air) are not included. In some cases, programs may still air on the original television network. This occurs predominantly with programs shared between subscription television networks.

==== International ====
Program	New network(s)	Previous network(s)	Date
(Japan) Battle of the Planets	ABC TV	Network Ten	7 May

== Television shows ==
=== 1950s ===
- Mr. Squiggle and Friends (1959 – 1999)

=== 1960s ===
- Four Corners (1961 – present)

=== 1970s ===
- Hey Hey It's Saturday (1971 – present)
- Young Talent Time (1971 – present)
- Countdown (1974 – 1987)
- The Don Lane Show (1975 – 1983)
- The Young Doctors (1976 – 1983)
- The Sullivans (1976 – 1983)
- 60 Minutes (1979 – present)
- Prisoner (1979 – 1986)

=== 1980s ===
- Sale of the Century (1980 – 2001)
- Kingswood Country (1980 – 1984)
- Home Sweet Home (1980 – 1982)
- Wheel of Fortune (1981 – present)
- Sunday (1981 – 2008)
- A Country Practice (1981 – 1994)
- Sara Dane (1982)
- Watch This Space (1982)
- The Simon Gallaher Show (1982 – 1983)
- Come Midnight Monday (1982)

== Ending this year ==
- 15 April - Come Midnight Monday (ABC TV, 1982)
- 23 June - Watch This Space (ABC TV, 1982)
- 1 July - Sara Dane (Network Ten, 1982)
- 1 October - Home Sweet Home (ABC TV, 1980-1982)
- 11 November - Videodisc (ABC TV, 1980-1982)
- 17 December - Taurus Rising (Nine Network, 1982)

== Returning this year ==
- 8 February - 11AM (Seven Network)

== See also ==
- 1982 in Australia
- List of Australian films of 1982
