= 1983 in Australian television =

1983 in Australian television lists notable events in Australian television in 1983 in chronological order as well as ongoing television series which aired that year.

== Events ==
=== Television ===
- January – Australian Music's Awards ceremony Countdown Awards rebrands the name to Countdown Music and Video Awards. As a result, Countdown returns for 1983 with a revamp, and gone were the screaming-louded studio audience, the iconic jingle and in their place – a quiet studio
- 24 January – Australian soap opera from Crawford Productions, Carson's Law, premieres on Network Ten starting off as a 90-minute movie length episode with another two-hour episode in the same timeslot the following night before settling into its twice-weekly 60-minute format the following week.
- 6 February - Seven Network's soap opera, Sons and Daughters, premieres on UK television, on the ITV network. All fourteen ITV regions air the entire series at their own pace during daytime, until 1994.
- March – British children's animated series Danger Mouse airs on ABC in Victoria and some other states of Australia for the first time.
- 10 March – Final episode of the Australian drama series The Sullivans airs on Nine Network.
- 30 March – Australian drama series The Young Doctors airs it final episode on Nine Network after a record-breaking of over 1,396 episodes.
- 22 April – The 25th Anniversary TV Week Logie Awards, hosted by Michael Willesee airs on Network Ten.
- 24 April – The Eurovision Song Contest is telecast in Australia for the first time.
- 30 April – Four Corners program aired exposing allegations that NSW Premier Neville Wran had tried to influence the magistry over the dropping of fraud charges against Kevin Humphreys, charged with misappropriation of funds from the Balmain Leagues Club. Humphreys is forced to resign his position as President of the NSWRL, while Wran has to face the Street Royal Commission over the allegations and was later exonerated.
- 19 May – Australian drama series Patrol Boat returns for a brand new series on ABC.
- 10 June – James Dibble retires from presenting ABC News NSW after 26 years.
- 1 July – The Australian Broadcasting Commission changes its name to the Australian Broadcasting Corporation.
- 18 July – Australian police drama series Cop Shop airs its 500th episode.
- 11 August – The ABC airs the final episode of the Australian drama series Patrol Boat.
- 26 September – After Australia's America's Cup win, Prime Minister Bob Hawke goes on the Today show and declared a national public holiday for that day, stating that "Any boss who sacks a worker for not turning up today is a bum."
- 14 October – Channel 0/28 commences transmission in Canberra, Goulburn and Cooma on the UHF band, and changes its name to Network 0/28.
- 29 October – Seven Network and various regional stations broadcast a selection of movies and TV programs in 3D in a 2-hour experiment.
- 20 November – Debut of American sitcom Cheers on the Nine Network.
- 27 November – The last ever episode of The Don Lane Show goes to air on the Nine Network. In the last episode before immigrating back to America, Don Lane celebrated his 50th Birthday Party.

=== Debuts ===
- 24 January – Carson's Law (Network Ten) (1983–1984)
- 2 February – Waterloo Station (Nine Network) (1983–1984)
- 3 March – Come and Get It (ABC TV) (1983–1992)
- 6 March – The Dismissal (Network Ten) (1983)
- 18 April – Starting Out (Nine Network) (1983)
- 12 July – Kings (Nine Network) (1983)
- 12 September – The Willow Bend Mystery (ABC TV) (1983)
- 20 September – Scales of Justice (ABC TV) (1983)
- 26 September – Australia You're Standing In It (ABC TV) (1983–1984)
- 4 October – All the Rivers Run (Seven Network) (1983)
- 24 October – Captain Cookaburra's Australiha (ABC TV) (1983–1988)
- 4 November – Five Mile Creek (Channel Seven) (1983)

=== New international programming ===
- 6 January – (Australia) / (United Kingdom) The Coral Island (ABC TV)
- 12 January – (United Kingdom) The Hitchhiker's Guide to the Galaxy (ABC TV)
- 8 February – (United States) Remington Steele (Nine Network)
- 8 February – (United Kingdom) Airline (ABC TV)
- 11 February – (United States) Matt Houston (Network Ten)
- 18 February – (United States) Joanie Loves Chachi (Nine Network)
- 21 February – (United States) Tales of the Gold Monkey (Channel Seven)
- 21 February – (United Kingdom) The Chinese Detective (ABC TV)
- 23 February – (United Kingdom) It Takes a Worried Man (ABC TV)
- 5 March – (United States) Pac-Man (Channel Seven)
- 7 March – (Canada) / (Germany) / (United Kingdom) Ritter's Cove (ABC TV)
- 8 March – (New Zealand) Under the Mountain (ABC TV)
- 11 March – (United Kingdom) The Amazing Adventures of Morph (ABC TV)
- 24 March – (United States) Knight Rider (1982) (Nine Network)
- 25 March – (United States) Fame (Seven Network)
- 5 April – (United States) Holocaust (Channel Seven)
- 12 April – (United Kingdom) Metal Mickey (ABC TV)
- 23 April – (United States) Tucker's Witch (Nine Network)
- 25 April – (United Kingdom) Never the Twain (ABC TV)
- 25 April – (France) The President's Diamonds (Network 0/28)
- 26 April – (United States) Bring 'Em Back Alive (Nine Network)
- 27 April – (United States) The Devlin Connection (Nine Network)
- 4 May – (Hungary) Gustavus (ABC TV)
- 9 May – (United States) Casper and the Angels (ABC TV)
- 5 June – (United States) Herbie the Love Bug (Nine Network)
- 12 June – (United Kingdom) The Barchester Chronicles (ABC TV)
- 17 June – (United Kingdom) Andy Robson (ABC TV)
- 24 June – (New Zealand) Sea Urchins (ABC TV)
- 6 July – (United Kingdom) The Legend of King Arthur (ABC TV)
- 29 July – (United States) T.J. Hooker (Network Ten)
- 31 July – (United Kingdom) Harry's Game (Nine Network)
- 8 August – (Japan) Star Blazers (ABC TV)
- 8 August – (Canada) Seeing Things (ABC TV)
- 22 August – (Italy) Cecilia's Family (Network 0/28)
- 19 September – (United Kingdom) Codename Icarus (ABC TV)
- 1 October – (United States) He-Man and the Masters of the Universe (1983) (Channel Seven)
- 14 October – (United States) No Soap, Radio (Nine Network)
- 13 November – (United States) Teachers Only (Channel Seven)
- 14 November – (United States) Gavilan (Channel Seven)
- 15 November – (United States) Open All Night (Nine Network)
- 15 November – (United States) World War III (Network Ten)
- 16 November – (United States) Silver Spoons (Network Ten)
- 18 November – (United States) / (United Kingdom) / (Canada) Fraggle Rock (Network Ten)
- 20 November – (United States) Cheers (Nine Network)
- 22 November – (United States) Simon and Simon (Channel Seven)
- 23 November – (United States) The Renegades (Network Ten)
- 27 November – (United States) At Ease (Network Ten)
- 28 November – (United States) Family Ties (Channel Seven)
- 1 December – (United States) Casablanca (Network Ten)
- 9 December – (United States) Highcliffe Manor (Nine Network)
- 16 December – (United Kingdom) Secombe with Music (ABC TV)
- 23 December – (Japan) Astro Boy (1980) (ABC TV)
- 25 December – (United Kingdom) The Snowman (ABC TV)
- (United States) Pandamonium (Nine Network)

== Television shows ==
=== 1950s ===
- Mr. Squiggle and Friends (1959–1999)

=== 1960s ===
- Four Corners (1961–present)

=== 1970s ===
- Hey Hey It's Saturday (1971–1999)
- Young Talent Time (1971–1989)
- Countdown (1974–1987)
- The Don Lane Show (1975–1983)
- Prisoner (1979–1986)

=== 1980s ===
- Kingswood Country (1980–1984)
- Sale of the Century (1980–2001)
- Wheel of Fortune (1981–present)
- Sunday (1981–2008)
- Today (1982–present)

== Ending this year ==
- 10 March – The Sullivans (Nine Network, 1976–1983)
- 30 March – The Young Doctors (Nine Network, 1976–1983)
- 20 May – The Simon Gallaher Show (ABC TV, 1982–1983)
- 11 August – Patrol Boat (ABC TV, 1979–1983)
- 4 October – Scales of Justice (ABC TV, 1983)
- 13 November – The Don Lane Show (Nine Network, 1975–1983)

== Births ==
- 24 August – Erin Molan, journalist and TV presenter

== See also ==
- 1983 in Australia
- List of Australian films of 1983
