= List of Australian films of 1980 =

== 1980 ==
Title	Director	Cast	Genre	Notes
Arcade		Lorrae Desmond, Garth Meade, Syd Heylen, Coral Kelly, Peggy Toppano, Anne Semler, Patrick Ward, Olga Tamara, Aileen Britton, Allan Penney, Bill Charlton, Jeremy Kewley, Christine Harris	Drama TV film / TV pilot to 1980 series	
Bedfellows	Julian Pringle	John Waters, Carol Burns	Drama ABC TV film	Screened as Australian Theatre Festival
Bellamy: The Massage Girl Murders	Gary Conway	John Stanton, Tim Elston, James Condon, Sally Conabere, Brian Young, John Krummel, Arna-Maria Winchester, Sean Scully, Adam Garnett, Jeremy Higgins, Tina Darby, Martin Harris, Brian Hinzelwood, Gordon Lishman, Phillip Hinton, Peter Meredith, Kevin Healy, Mandi Climpson, Donald Carter, Charlotte Calder, Lyn Collingwood, Steve Rackman, Faye Donaldson	Crime / Drama / Thriller TV film / TV Pilot to series (1980-1981)	
Big Toys	Chris Thomson	Diane Cilento, Colin Friels, Kate Fitzpatrick, John Gaden, Max Cullen	Comedy ABC TV film	Screened as Australian Theatre Festival
Blood Money	Christopher Fitchett	John Flaus, Chrissie James, Bryan Brown, Sophie Murphy, Peter Curtin, Sue Jones, John Proper, Michael Carman, Peter Stratford	Crime / Drama Short Feature film	IMDb
Breaker Morant	Bruce Beresford	Edward Woodward, Jack Thompson, John Waters, Bryan Brown, Charles "Bud" Tingwell, Terence Donovan, Lewis Fitz-Gerald, Rod Mullinar	Drama Feature film	IMDb, Won ten awards at the AFI awards and won an award at the 1980 Cannes Film Festival
The Chain Reaction	Ian Barry	Steve Bisley, Arna-Maria Winchester, Ross Thompson, Richard Moir, Hugh Keays-Byrne, Patrick Ward, Ralph Cotterill, Lorna Lesley, Frankie J Holden, Kym Gyngell,	Action / Thriller Feature film	IMDb
The Club	Bruce Beresford	Jack Thompson, Graham Kennedy, Frank Wilson, John Howard, Harold Hopkins, Alan Cassell, Maurie Fields, Maggie Doyle	Comedy / Drama Feature film	IMDb
The Coast Town Kids	Peter Maxwell	John Wood, Frank Gallacher, Alan Hopgood, Peter Felmingham, Robert Korosy, Sally Wilde, Justin Stanford	Drama / Family TV film / TV Pilot	
The Comeback	Kit Laughlin	Arnold Schwarzenegger	Action Documentary	IMDb
Coralie Lansdowne Says No	Michael Carson	Wendy Hughes, David Waters, Brian Blain, Elaine Mangan, Mary Lou Stewart, Basil Clarke, Robert Coleby	Drama ABC TV film	Screened as Australian Theatre Festival
Cornflakes for Tea	John Colquhoun	Howard Kloester, Linda Hartley, Beverley Dunn, Tamblyn Lord, Bunney Brooke, Bruce Kerr, Kerry Armstrong, Candy Raymond, Vince D'Amico, Peggy Nichols, Max Cullen	Family TV film	
Dead Man's Float	Peter Sharp	Sally Boyden, Greg Rowe, Jacqui Gordon, Rick Ireland, Gus Mercurio, Bill Hunter, Sue Jones, John Heywood, Chris Haywood, Bunney Brooke, Ernie Sigley, Brian Hannan	Crime / Drama / Family TV film	IMDb
Departmental	Keith Wilkes	Ray Barrett, Martin Vaughan, Gary Day, Rod Williams	Drama ABC TV film	Screened as Australian Theatre Festival
The Department	Brian Bell	Richard Moir, Peter Sumner, Barbara Stephens, John Ewart, Anne Tenney	Drama ABC TV film	Screened as Australian Theatre Festival
The Earthling	Peter Collinson	William Holden, Rick Schroder, Jack Thompson, Olivia Hamnett, Alwyn Kurts, Pat Evison, Ray Barrett, Jane Harders, Allan Penney, Tony Barry, Willie Fennell, Ray Meagher	Adventure	IMDb
Fatty Finn	Maurice Murphy	Bert Newton, Noni Hazlehurst, Ben Oxenbould, Rebecca Rigg, Lorraine Bayly, Gerard Kennedy, Henri Szeps, Greg Kelly, Tony Llewellyn-Jones, Frank Wilson, Ross Higgins, Tony Alvarez, Jeremy Larsson	Comedy / Family Feature film	IMDb
Final Cut	Ross Dimsey	Lou Brown, Jennifer Cluff, David Clendenning, Thaddeus Smith, Narrelle Johnson, Carmen J McCall	Drama / Thriller Feature film	IMDb aka: "Death Games" aka Death Games
Fourteen's Good, Eighteen's Better	Gillian Armstrong	Kerry Carlson, Diana Doman, Josie Petersen	Documentary	IMDb
The Girl Who Met Simone de Beauvoir in Paris	Richard Wherrett	Peter Carroll, John Clayton, Tony Llewellyn-Jones, Judy Morris	Short Film	IMDb
Groping	Alex Proyas, Salik Silverstein	Tracey Wadey	Short	IMDb
Hard Knocks	Don McLennan	Tracy Mann, John Arnold, Kirsty Grant, Bill Hunter, Kim Rushworth, Max Cullen, Penelope Stewart, Hilton Bonner, Tony Bonner, Tony Barry	Drama Feature film	IMDb
Harlequin	Simon Wincer	Robert Powell, David Hemmings, Carmen Duncan, Broderick Crawford, Gus Mercurio, Alan Cassell, Mark Spain, John Frawley, Alyson Best	Drama / Fantasy / Mystery / Thriller Feature film	IMDb
The Kingdom of Nek Chand	Paul Cox		Documentary Short	IMDb
Lucinda Brayford	John Gauci	Wendy Hughes, Sam Neill, Barry Quin	Drama	IMDb
Manganinnie	John Honey	Mawuyul Yanthalawuy, Anna Ralph, Phillip Hinton	Drama Feature film	IMDb aka "Darkening Flame"
...Maybe This Time	Chris McGill	Judy Morris, Bill Hunter, Michael Preston, Michele Fawdon, Leonard Teale, Chris Haywood, Rod Mullinar, Ken Shorter, Jill Perryman, Leonard Teale, Lorna Lesley, Celia de Burgh	Drama Feature film	IMDb
Mystery Island	Gene W. Scott	Jayson Duncan, Niklas Juhlin, Michael McGlinchey, Melissa Woodhams, Bill Charlton, Ray Marshall, Ray Meagher, Allan Penney, Tom Richards	Drama / Family TV film	IMDb
Nightmares	John D. Lamond	Jenny Neumann, Gary Sweet, Nina Landis, Max Phipps, Edmund Pegge, Sue Jones, Briony Behets, John Michael Howson, Gary Day, Terry Besanko	Horror / Thriller Feature film	IMDb, aka "Stage Fright"
Palm Beach	Albie Thoms	Kenneth Brown, Nat Young, Bryan Brown	Drama	IMDb, shot in 1978
Pianoforte	Antoinette Starkiewicz		Short	IMDb
Psychic Visions of the Future	William Bemister		Documentary Short	IMDb
Raccolta d'inverno	Brian McKenzie		Short	IMDb
Rush				
Slippery Slide	Donald Crombie	Simon Burke, Arkie Whiteley, Jon Blake, Gerry Duggan, Martin Harris, Barry Pierce, Craig Doyle, Tim Franklin, Brian Young, Ken Short, Maureen Gay, Noreen Le Mottee, Allen Harvey, Hazel Alger, John Denham, Bernard Pidd	Drama TV film	
Stepping Out	Chris Noonan	Chris Dobbin, Aldo Gennaro, Romayne Grace	Documentary Short	IMDb
Stir	Stephen Wallace	Bryan Brown, Max Phipps, Dennis Miller, Michael Gow, Gary Waddell, Phil Motherwell, Paul Sonkkila, Peter Kowitz, Ray Meagher, Syd Heylen	Prison drama Feature film	IMDb
Touch and Go	Peter Maxwell	Wendy Hughes, Chantal Contouri, Carmen Duncan, Jon English, Brian Blain, Jeanie Drynan, Christine Amor, Liddy Clark, John Bluthal, Barbara Stephens, Vince Martin, Beryl Cheers, Roger Ward, Les Foxcroft	Crime /Comedy / Drama Feature film	IMDb
Wronsky	Ian Pringle	Ross Thompson, Miranda Brown, Doug Ling, Phil Dagg, John Flaus	Short Feature film	
Yap: How Did You Know We'd Like TV?	Dennis O'Rourke	Gabriel Avin, Mike Bermin, Mike Branch	Documentary Short	IMDb

== See also ==
- 1980 in Australia
- 1980 in Australian television
