= 1983 in Australia =

- Monarch: Elizabeth II
- Governor-General: Sir Ninian Stephen
- Prime minister: Malcolm Fraser, then Bob Hawke
- Australian of the Year: Robert de Castella
- Elections: WA, Federal, QLD, NT

The following lists events that happened during 1983 in Australia.

- Decades: 1960s; 1970s; 1980s; 1990s; 2000s
- See also: 1983 in Australian television; 1983 in Australian literature; Other events of 1983; Federal election; Timeline of Australian history

== Incumbents ==
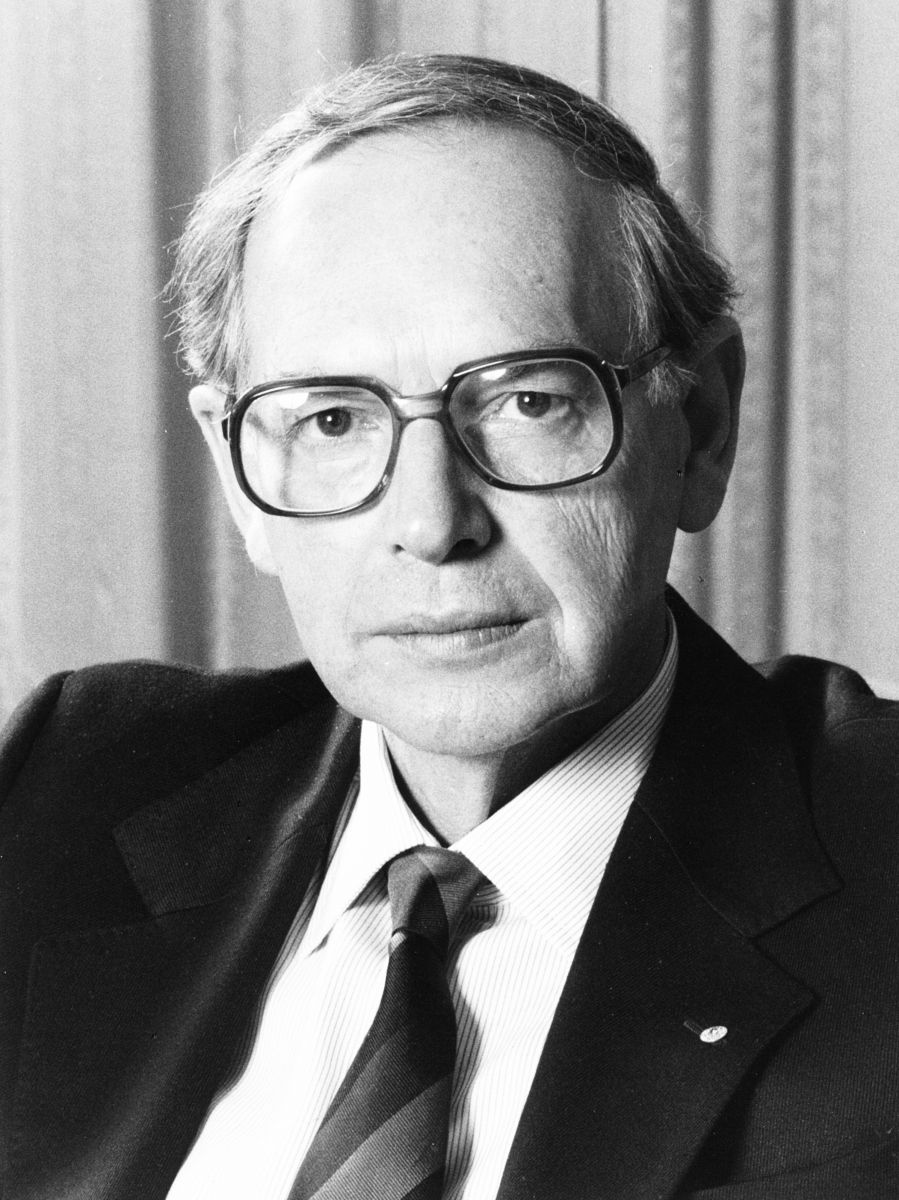
Sir Ninian Stephen

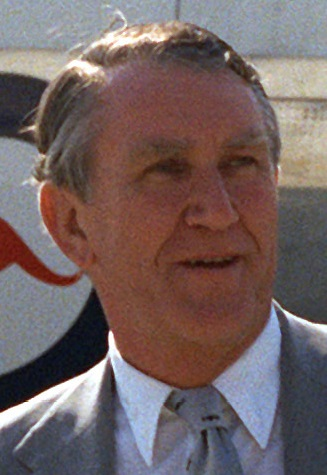
Malcolm Fraser

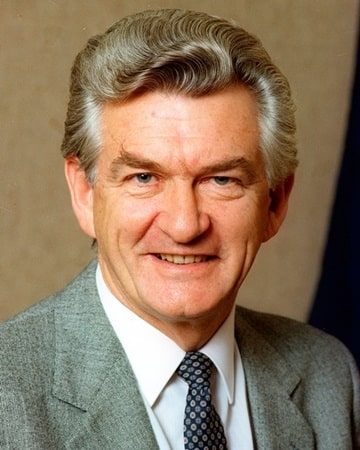
Bob Hawke

- Monarch – Elizabeth II
- Governor-General – Sir Ninian Stephen
- Prime Minister – Malcolm Fraser (until 11 March), then Bob Hawke
  - Deputy Prime Minister – Doug Anthony (until 11 March), then Lionel Bowen
  - Opposition Leader – Bill Hayden (until 3 February), then Bob Hawke (until 11 March), then Andrew Peacock
- Chief Justice – Sir Harry Gibbs

=== State and territory leaders ===
- Premier of New South Wales – Neville Wran
  - Opposition Leader – John Dowd (until 15 March), then Nick Greiner
- Premier of Queensland – Joh Bjelke-Petersen
  - Opposition Leader – Keith Wright
- Premier of South Australia – John Bannon
  - Opposition Leader – John Olsen
- Premier of Tasmania – Robin Gray
  - Opposition Leader – Ken Wriedt
- Premier of Victoria – John Cain Jr.
  - Opposition Leader – Jeff Kennett
- Premier of Western Australia – Ray O'Connor (until 25 February), then Brian Burke
  - Opposition Leader – Brian Burke (until 25 February), then Ray O'Connor
- Chief Minister of the Northern Territory – Paul Everingham
  - Opposition Leader – Bob Collins
- Chief Minister of Norfolk Island – David Buffett

=== Governors and administrators ===
- Governor of New South Wales – Sir James Rowland
- Governor of Queensland – Sir James Ramsay
- Governor of South Australia – Sir Donald Dunstan
- Governor of Tasmania – Sir James Plimsoll
- Governor of Victoria – Sir Brian Murray
- Governor of Western Australia – Sir Richard Trowbridge (until 24 November)
- Administrator of Norfolk Island – Raymond Trebilco
- Administrator of the Northern Territory – Eric Johnston

== Events ==
=== January ===
- 4 January – Louise Bell, aged 10-years, disappeared from her bedroom in Hackham West, South Australia. Her body has not been located. On 11 November 2016, 68-year-old Dieter Pfennig was found guilty of murdering her. He was already serving a life sentence for murdering a boy in 1989 and the abduction and rape of another boy.
- 14 January – Federal Opposition Leader Bill Hayden reshuffles the shadow frontbench, while a conspiracy to depose him still looms large.

=== February ===
- 3 February – Prime Minister Malcolm Fraser is granted a double dissolution of both houses of parliament for a double dissolution election for 5 March. On the same day Bob Hawke replaces Bill Hayden as federal ALP leader.
- 8 February – A severe dust storm sweeps through Melbourne and deposits an estimated 1,000 tonnes of topsoil on the city.
- 16 February – The Ash Wednesday bushfires in Victoria and South Australia claim the lives of 72 people and destroys over 2,000 homes in one of Australia's worst ever fires.
- 21 February – The Australian Council of Trade Unions (ACTU) endorses the Prices and Incomes Accord drawn up jointly with the Australian Labor Party.
- 23 February – Prime Minister Malcolm Fraser's claim that people's savings would be safer under the bed than in the bank exposes him to ridicule, including Bob Hawke's riposte, "But that's where the Commies are!".

=== March ===
- 5 March – 1983 Australian federal election. The ALP, with Bob Hawke as leader wins with one of the biggest parliamentary majorities in Australian political history.
- 8 March – The Australian dollar is devalued by 10 per cent.
- 11 March – The Hawke government's new ministry is sworn in, Andrew Peacock becomes Federal Opposition Leader after he wins the Liberal Party leadership. John Howard retains the Deputy Liberal leader position.

=== April ===
- 11 April
  - A National Economic Summit is convened in Canberra to formulate future policy.
  - News of "spy flights" by Royal Australian Air Force aircraft over Tasmania under orders from Minister Gareth Evans sparks outrage.
- 21 April – The National and International Security Committee decides to expel Soviet First Secretary Valery Ivanov and to blacklist David Coombe, a Canberra lobbyist and former Australian Labor Party National Secretary, whom Ivanov was thought to have been cultivating.
- 22 April – Soviet embassy official Valery Ivanov is expelled from Australia for allegedly trying to recruit spies in the Australian government.

=== May ===
- 1 May – The Sydney Entertainment Centre is opened.
- 3 May – All of Queensland is declared a disaster area after a fortnight of almost continuous rain breaks a drought and floods nine river systems.
- 10 May – Canberra lobbyist and former Federal Secretary of the Australian Labor Party David Combe is declared persona non-grata by the Federal Government because of his association with Valery Ivanov.
- 11 May – Sir Laurence Street is called on to head a Royal Commission after New South Wales Premier Neville Wran is alleged by the ABC program Four Corners to have attempted to influence the NSW magistracy. Wran temporarily hands over power to his deputy.
- 16 May – NSW Premier Neville Wran steps aside in response to allegations raised by ABC program Four Corners that he attempted to influence the NSW Magistry
- 19 May – The Federal Government's announcement of sweeping changes to the superannuation structure evoke widespread opposition.

=== June ===
- 14 June – The Royal Australian Navy patrol boat HMAS Bendigo rescues British solo navigator, Peter Bird, as his boat was wrecked just 33 kilometres from Wreck Bay at the northern extremity of Queensland. Bird had crossed 9,000 kilometres of the Pacific Ocean in 294 days in a 10.6-metre rowing boat.

=== July ===
- 1 July – High Court blocks construction of the Franklin Dam in Tasmania in the Tasmanian Dams Case.
- 14 July – Mick Young resigns as Special Minister of State after admitting being indiscrete in remarks he made about the expulsion of Soviet First Secretary Valery Ivanov to lobbyist Eric Walsh and Australian National Opinion Polls' Rod Cameron, both of whom were friends of Mick Young.
- 18 July – The first death in Australia attributable to Acquired Immune Deficiency Syndrome (AIDS) occurs.
- 22 July – Dick Smith completes the world's first solo helicopter flight around the globe.
- 28 July – New South Wales premier Neville Wran exonerated by Street Royal Commission over claims raised by ABC program Four Corners which claimed that he attempted to influence the NSW magistry.

=== August ===
- 2 August – Paul Sharp becomes the first European to cross the Simpson Desert alone and on foot.
- 4 August – Queensland Welfare Minister Terry White is dismissed from his portfolio for voting with the opposition during a debate on the establishment of a public accounts committee, despite this being a part of both Liberal and Labor policies.
- 18 August – A road train is deliberately driven into a motel at Ayers Rock, killing five people and injuring a further 20. The driver, Douglas Edwin Crabbe, is subsequently convicted of murder.

=== September ===
- 4 September – Six men walk underwater in Sydney Harbour as part of an attempt to break a world record. They achieved 82.9 kilometres (51.5 mi) in 48 hours.
- 23 September – The Australian Conciliation and Arbitration Commission sets down guidelines for the establishment of a centralised system of wage-fixing utilising full indexation.
- 26 September – Australia II wins the America's Cup ending the New York Yacht Club's 132-year domination of the race.

=== November ===
- 30 November – ASIS (Australian Secret Intelligence Service) officer bungle a training exercise in the Melbourne Sheraton hotel.

=== December ===
- 9 December – Federal Treasurer Paul Keating announces that the Australian dollar would be allowed to float on the international money market. Under the old flexible peg system, the Reserve Bank bought and sold all Australian dollars and cleared the market at the end of the day.
- 15 December – Legendary Australian band Cold Chisel plays its farewell show at the Sydney Entertainment Centre after more than a decade together.

== Arts and literature ==
- "No award" is made for the Miles Franklin Award

== Film ==
- BMX Bandits
- Buddies
- Careful, He Might Hear You
- Phar Lap

== Television ==
- 30 April – Four Corners program aired exposing allegations that NSW Premier Neville Wran had tried to influence the magistry over the dropping of fraud charges against Kevin Humphreys, charged with misappropriation of funds from the Balmain Leagues Club. Humphreys is forced to resign his position as President of the NSWRL, while Wran has to face the Street Royal Commission over the allegations & was later exonerated.
- 26 September – After Australia's America's Cup win, Prime Minister Bob Hawke goes on the Today show and declared a public holiday for that day, stating that "any boss who sacks anyone for not turning up today is a bum."
- 27 November – The last episode of The Don Lane Show goes to air on GTV-9.

== Sport ==
- 26 February – Value of a rugby league try is increased to four points for the start of the 1983 season. A number of other rule changes are also made, including a "hand over" after six tackles instead of a scrum.
- 20 March – Robert de Castella is Australia's best finisher at the eleventh IAAF World Cross Country Championships, staged in Gateshead, England. He finishes in sixth place (37:00.0) in the race over 11,994 metres.
- 11 May – VFL Board accepts the findings of the McKinsey Report in principle, suggesting major changes to league administration including the establishment of an independent commission.
- 12 June – John Stanley wins the men's national marathon title, clocking 2:17:04 in Sydney, while Megan Sloane claims the women's title in 2:37:50.
- 18 June – Fitzroy produce an amazing performance against North Melbourne in a top-of-the-table clash at the Junction Oval, winning by 150 points and kicking the third-highest VFL score to that point. The previous biggest loss by a minor premier was 69 points. Matt Rendell, effectively playing as a seventh forward, kicked eight goals after having not kicked one for seventeen games.
- 9 July – Australia's run of 16 consecutive Rugby League test victories is ended when New Zealand upset Australia 19–12 at Lang Park, Brisbane.
- 22 July – Fitzroy with 12.6 (78) and St Kilda with 7.1 (43) set a record aggregate score for a quarter in VFL football, beating the previous record of 18.2 (110) in 1975 by Essendon and Carlton.
- 5 August – First game played under lights since 1952. Geelong defeat Sydney at the SCG
- 24 September – Hawthorn (20.20.140) defeat Essendon (8.9.57) to win the 87th VFL premiership
- 25 September – Parramatta Eels defeat minor premiers Manly-Warringah Sea Eagles 18–6 to win the 76th NSWRL premiership.
- 26 September – Newtown Jets & Western Suburbs Magpies axed from the 1984 NSWRL premiership. It is announced that Newtown will return as Newtown-Campbelltown in 1985. The move never eventuates.
- 1 November – Kiwi wins the Melbourne Cup.
- 5 December – NSWRL reinstate Western Suburbs after Equity Court ruling. Wests end up moving to Campbelltown around the same time.
- 28 December – Pat Cash clinches a Davis Cup tennis win for Australia over Sweden.
- Ross Glendinning (North Melbourne) wins the Brownlow Medal

== Births ==
- 3 January – Kelvin Robertson, basketball player
- 9 January – Scott Brennan, Olympic rower
- 14 January – Jason Krejza, cricketer
- 17 January – Rick Kelly, motor racing driver
- 19 January – Larry Davidson, basketball player
- 20 January – Paula Taylor, Thai-born Australian model and actress
- 21 January – Monique Adamczak, tennis player
- 23 January – Sarah Tait, rower (d. 2016)
- 24 January – Craig Horner, actor and musician
- 26 January – Ryan Rowland-Smith, baseball player
- 27 January – Rebecca Judd, model and television presenter
- 30 January – Ella Hooper, singer-songwriter
- 2 February – Lee Holdsworth, motor racing driver
- 4 February – Jarrad Waite, footballer
- 6 February – Jamie Whincup, racing driver
- 15 February – Alan Didak, footballer
- 22 February – Clint McKay, cricketer
- 28 February
  - Martin Iti, basketball player
  - Trent Oeltjen, baseball player
- 15 March – Ben Hilfenhaus, cricketer
- 17 March – Penny McNamee, actress
- 12 April
  - Jelena Dokić, tennis player
  - Jonti Richter, soccer player
- 20 April – Miranda Kerr, model
- 25 April – Johnathan Thurston, rugby league footballer
- 3 May – Alex Loughton, basketball player
- 10 May – Fiona Hammond, water polo player
- 11 May – Holly Valance, actress and singer
- 16 May – Daniel Kerr, footballer
- 20 May – Nikki Boyd, politician
- 25 May – Michael Caruso, motor racing driver
- 31 May – Dustin Wells, footballer
- 3 June – Anthony Petrie, basketball player
- 8 June – Mark Worthington, basketball player
- 18 June
  - Cameron Smith, rugby league footballer
  - Billy Slater, rugby league footballer
- 7 July – Renee Chappell, cricketer
- 21 July – Amy Mizzi, actress
- 22 July – Sharni Vinson, model, actress and dancer
- 23 July – Bec Cartwright, actress
- 4 August
  - Nathaniel Buzolic, actor
  - Jai Crawford, cyclist
- 11 August – Chris Hemsworth, actor
- 14 August – Jacob Holmes, basketball player
- 18 August – Russell Ford, field hockey striker
- 19 August – Tammin Sursok, actress
- 27 August – Suzie Fraser, water polo player
- 8 September – Chris Judd, Australian rules footballer
- 17 October – Jesse Rosenfeld, actor
- 22 October – David Barlow, basketball player
- 12 November – Kate Bell, actress
- 4 December – Jimmy Bartel, Australian rules footballer
- 5 December – Cooper Cronk, rugby league footballer
- 9 December – Tommy Greer, basketball player
- 18 December – Darren Ng, basketball player

== Deaths ==
- 28 January – Frank Forde, 15th Prime Minister of Australia (b. 1890)
- 16 April – Tim McNamara, country musician (b. 1922)
- 1 May – Eric Porter, animator and film director (b. 1911)
- 5 August – Leo Rush, Australian rules footballer (b. 1890)
- 29 August – Decima Norman, Olympic athlete (b. 1909)
- 11 September – Brian Lawrance, bandleader (b. 1909)
- 27 September – Wilfred Burchett, journalist (b. 1911)
- 2 October – Bettina Gorton, 18th Spouse of the Prime Minister of Australia and academic (born in the United States) (b. 1915)
- 10 December – Elwyn Flint, linguist (b. 1910)

== See also ==
- 1983 in Australian literature
- 1983 in Australian television
- List of Australian films of 1983
