= Jay Kerr =

American actor

Jay Kerr (born November 16, 1948) is an American actor. A native of Del Rio, Texas, he was raised on a ranch, and raced horses, growing up. He has appeared in various movies and television series including his longest role as "Con Madigan" in the television series Five Mile Creek for three years.

== Partial filmography ==
- 1st &Ten
- Blossom
- Dynasty
- Five Mile Creek (Disney Channel television series, as "Con Madigan")
- Hard Country
- The John Larroquette Show
- Wizards and Warriors
