= 1980 in Australia =

- Monarch: Elizabeth II
- Governor-General: Sir Zelman Cowen
- Prime minister: Malcolm Fraser
- Population: 14,515,729
- Australian of the Year: Manning Clark
- Elections: WA, NT, Federal, QLD

The following lists events that happened during 1980 in Australia.

- Decades: 1960s; 1970s; 1980s; 1990s; 2000s
- See also: 1980 in Australian television; 1980 in Australian literature; Other events of 1980; Federal election; Timeline of Australian history

== Incumbents ==
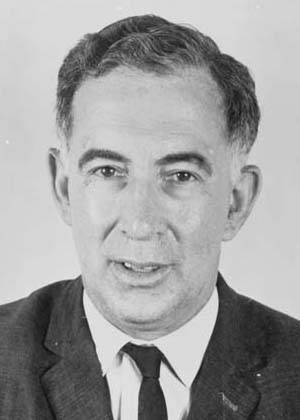
Sir Zelman Cowen

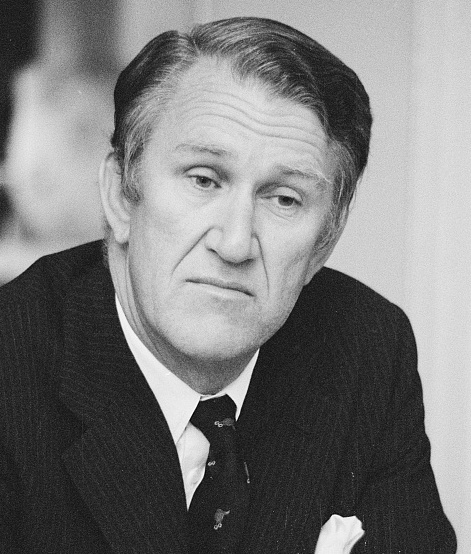
Malcolm Fraser

- Monarch – Elizabeth II
- Governor-General – Sir Zelman Cowen
- Prime Minister – Malcolm Fraser
  - Deputy Prime Minister – Doug Anthony
  - Opposition Leader – Bill Hayden
- Chief Justice – Sir Garfield Barwick

=== State and territory leaders ===
- Premier of New South Wales – Neville Wran
  - Opposition Leader – John Mason
- Premier of Queensland – Joh Bjelke-Petersen
  - Opposition Leader – Ed Casey
- Premier of South Australia – David Tonkin
  - Opposition Leader – John Bannon
- Premier of Tasmania – Doug Lowe
  - Opposition Leader – Geoff Pearsall
- Premier of Victoria – Rupert Hamer
  - Opposition Leader – Frank Wilkes
- Premier of Western Australia – Sir Charles Court
  - Opposition Leader – Ron Davies
- Chief Minister of the Northern Territory – Paul Everingham
  - Opposition Leader – Jon Isaacs
- Chief Minister of Norfolk Island – David Buffett

=== Governors and administrators ===
- Governor of New South Wales – Sir Roden Cutler
- Governor of Queensland – Sir James Ramsay
- Governor of South Australia – Sir Keith Seaman
- Governor of Tasmania – Sir Stanley Burbury
- Governor of Victoria – Sir Henry Winneke
- Governor of Western Australia – Sir Wallace Kyle (until 30 September), then Sir Richard Trowbridge (from 25 November)
- Administrator of Norfolk Island – Peter Coleman
- Administrator of the Northern Territory – John England

== Events ==
=== January ===
- 9 January – Prime Minister Malcolm Fraser announces sanctions against the Soviet Union following its invasion of Afghanistan.
- 17 January – Debbie Wardley becomes Australia's first female pilot to take to the skies when she co-pilots a Fokker Friendship on Ansett Flight 232 on the so-called "milk run" from Alice Springs to Darwin. The flight marks the end of a 15-month legal battle with Ansett Airlines to overcome gender-based discrimination which had prevented her from earlier taking the controls.
- 24 January – The first section of Melbourne's underground railway loop is opened.
- 27 January – Frank Nugan of the failed Nugan Hand Bank is found dead at the wheel of his Mercedes by police at Lithgow.

=== February ===
- 19 February - Rock singer Bon Scott of the band AC/DC, at age 33 found dead having slept in parked car in London, UK.
- 21 February – Advance Airlines Flight 4210 crashes at Sydney Airport, killing all 13 aboard the Beechcraft King Air 200 aircraft.
- 23 February – The 1980 Western Australian state election takes place and the Liberal/National coalition government of Sir Charles Court is re-elected.

=== March ===
- 1 March – The federal executive of the Australian Labor Party decides to intervene in the Queensland branch, with most key office-holders replaced.
- 25 March – Defence Minister James Killen announces that Cockburn Sound Western Australia will offer base and home port facilities to the United States Navy.

=== April ===
- 3 April – It's revealed that a sensitive report entitled The Threat of the Internal Security of Australia is lost by the Office of National Assessments.
- 26 April – Louise and Charmian Faulkner disappear from outside their flat in St Kilda, Melbourne, Australia.
- 30 April – Automotive company Chrysler Australia Limited is taken over by Japanese company Mitsubishi after the American-based Chrysler Corporation sold its Australian subsidiary to the dynamic Japanese automobile manufacturer for $80 million. The declining fortunes of Chrysler's North American operations forced the sale.

=== May ===
- 1 May – The Australian branch of Earthwatch Institute is established in Sydney.
- 15 May – The telecommunications tower on Canberra's Black Mountain is officially opened.
- 23 May – The Australian Olympic Federation announces it will send an Olympic delegation to Moscow, despite objections raised by the prime minister. The tight 6–5 ballot, announced by Federation President Syd Grange at Melbourne's Sheraton Hotel ends speculation about Australia's role following America's boycott of the games. Prime Minister Malcolm Fraser is critical of the decision, expressing hope that the Australian participation would not be interpreted as an endorsement of Soviet policy.
- 24 May – Queen Elizabeth II and Prince Philip arrive in Australia.
- 26 May – The High Court of Australia building in Canberra is opened by Queen Elizabeth II. Prince Philip is also in attendance.
- 31 May – The Royal Commission into Drug Trafficking (Woodward Royal Commission) estimates that there are at least 20,000 heroin addicts in Australia.

=== June ===
- 7 June – The 1980 Northern Territory general election takes place and Paul Everingham's Country Liberal Party government is re-elected.
- 23 June –
  - Australia's first "test tube baby" Candice Elizabeth Reed is born in Melbourne's Royal Women's Hospital.
  - David Opas, a Judge of the Family Court of Australia is shot and killed outside his home.
- 26 June – Australian Richard Thorp, of the United States firm Mitchell, Giurgola and Thorp, wins the competition for the design of the new Parliament House, Canberra.

=== July ===
- 1 July – Women are allowed to join surf clubs as full members.
- 4 July – Newcastle's afternoon newspaper The Newcastle Sun ceases publication.

=== August ===
- 17 August – Nine-week-old Azaria Chamberlain disappears from a campsite at Ayers Rock (Uluru), later confirmed to be taken by a dingo.
- 22 August – Confusion reigns at the inquest into the death of Frank Nugan of the failed Nugan Hand banking group. A letter is produced on the final day of the inquest signed by the secretary to the Commissioner Mr. Justice Woodward, who presided over the Royal Commission into Drug Trafficking, appears to clear Nugan of any involvement with narcotics dealing.

=== September ===
- 26 September – The Lonie Report in Victoria recommends the closure of half the suburban rail lines, all country passenger rail lines and a number of tram routes. It also recommends huge freeway expansion. The report is controversial and protests cause its recommendations to be moderated.
- 30 September – Bob Hawke retires as President of the Australian Council of Trade Unions (ACTU) to contest the seat of Wills in the federal election. Cliff Dolan becomes the new President of the ACTU.

=== October ===
- 1 October – The Costigan Royal Commission begins in Melbourne, with the purpose of inquiring into the activities of the Federated Ship Painters and Dockers Union.
- 9 October – The standard-gauge railway from Tarcoola to Alice Springs is opened by Princess Alexandra.
- 14 October – Violet Roberts, 52, and Bruce Roberts, 22, are released from prison after serving almost five years of their sentence after being found guilty in March 1976 of murdering their violent husband and father, Eric Leslie Roberts. The mother and son are "released on licence" just 24 hours after the New South Wales Attorney-General Frank Walker recommended the action to the Department of Corrective Services, following sustained pressure from supporters who argued that the sentences were unduly harsh. The Attorney-General had publicly described the sentences as a miscarriage of justice.
- 18 October – The 1980 Australian federal election is held with Malcolm Fraser's Liberal/National Country Coalition government re-elected with a substantially reduced majority, defeating the Labor Party led by Bill Hayden. The Government also loses control of the Senate, with the Australian Democrats winning the balance of power.

=== November ===
- 20 November – Former Prime Minister Sir John McEwen dies.
- 29 November – The 1980 Queensland state election takes place with the National Party government of Joh Bjelke-Petersen being re-elected.

=== December ===
- 1 December – A memorial service is held for former Australian prime minister Sir John McEwen at St Paul's Cathedral in Melbourne.
- 2 December – The Federal Government lifts controls regulating the interest rates offered by banks on customer deposits.
- 15 December – The Azaria Chamberlain inquest begins in Alice Springs.
- 17 December –
  - Turkish Consul-General, Şarık Arıyak and his bodyguard, Engin Sever, are shot dead in the street outside the consulate in Dover Heights, Sydney, becoming the victims of Australia's first political assassinations. The obscure international terrorist army, the "Justice Commandoes of Armenian Genocide", claim responsibility for the deaths only 20 minutes after the shootings.
  - A Woolworths store in the Wollongong suburb of Warilla is bombed, causing $300,000 worth of damage.
- 19 December – A Woolworths store at Maitland, New South Wales is bombed, suffering more than $300,000 worth of damage.
- 20 December – A Woolworths store at Orange, New South Wales receives a call from a man threatening to bomb a Woolworths store unless he is paid $1 million.
- 23 December – Victoria decriminalises homosexual acts between consenting adults, with the Royal Assent of the Crimes (Sexual Offences) Act 1980.
- 24 December – Woolworths' Town Hall store in the centre of Sydney is devastated by a bomb blast – the chain's third store to be targeted in nine days. Authorities received only 10 minutes' warning of the bombing, which miraculously caused no serious casualties after 2,000 shoppers and staff were evacuated from the area.
- 26 December – Police offer a $250,000 reward for information relating to the recent Woolworths bombings. The reward is the largest ever offered in Australian history.

== Arts and literature ==
- Jessica Anderson's novel The Impersonators wins the Miles Franklin Award.

== Film ==
- 5 July – The Australian film Breaker Morant opens in Sydney and Melbourne, having been the toast of the recent 1980 Cannes Film Festival.
- 18 September – The Club starring Jack Thompson and Graham Kennedy is released to cinemas.

== Television ==
- 17 January – Gippsland's GLV-10 becomes GLV-8. This is done so that Melbourne's ATV-0 can become ATV-10.
- 20 January – ATV-0 becomes ATV-10. This move prompts the 0–10 Network to change its name to Network Ten, although Brisbane's TVQ-0 would continue to broadcast on Channel 0 until 1988. On the same night, Ten's new drama series Arcade premieres. It is regarded as the biggest flop in Australian television history, costing over $3 million to make and being axed after 49 episodes.
- 14 July – Nine Network's new quiz show Sale of the Century launches, bringing in record ratings with Nine winning the 7pm timeslot.
- 30 January – Kingswood Country debuts on the Seven Network.
- 15 October – Mini-series The Last Outlaw debuts on Seven.
- 24 October – Australia's new multicultural television network SBS is officially opened by Malcolm Fraser as it commences transmission in Sydney & Melbourne on VHF Channel 0 & UHF Channel 28, becoming the first station in Australia to use UHF frequencies.

== Sport ==
- 5 July – Evonne Cawley (née Goolagong) wins the Wimbledon singles for the second time, easily beating the popular American champion Chris Evert-Lloyd 6–1, 7–6 in the final. She becomes the first woman to have won the Wimbledon singles nine years apart and is the first mother ever to take tennis' most coveted prize.
- 8 July – The inaugural 1980 State of Origin game is played at Lang Park, which is won by Queensland who defeat New South Wales 20 – 10.
- 27 July – Laurie Whitty wins the men's national marathon title, clocking 2:19:00 in Adelaide.
- 27 September –
  - The Canterbury Bulldogs defeat the Eastern Suburbs Roosters (now Sydney Roosters) 18–4 to win the 73rd NSWRL premiership. It is the first premiership for Canterbury since 1942 & the last grand final played on a Saturday. In the process, Steve Gearin scores one of the most spectacular tries in history. Penrith finish in last position, claiming the wooden spoon.
  - The Richmond Tigers (23.21.159) defeat the Collingwood Magpies (9.24.78) to win the 84th VFL premiership. It was the last premiership win for Richmond until 2017.
- 5 October – Alan Jones becomes the second Australian driver to win the Formula One World Drivers Championship after winning the final race of the season at Watkins Glen, New York.
- 4 November – Beldale Ball wins the Melbourne Cup.
- 13 December – Illawarra is accepted as the 13th team in the NSWRL premiership for 1982, making them the first team from outside the Sydney metropolitan area to compete in the competition since Newcastle in 1909.

== Births ==
- 5 January – Brad Meyers, rugby league player
- 7 January – Reece Simmonds, rugby league player
- 8 January – Adam Goodes, footballer
- 9 January – Luke Patten, rugby league player and referee
- 17 January – Kylie Wheeler, heptathlete
- 25 January – Alayna Burns, track cyclist
- 8 February – Cameron Muncey, singer and guitarist (Jet)
- 2 March – Rebel Wilson, actress and producer
- 13 March – Nathan Phillips, actor
- 27 March – Toni Cronk, field hockey goalkeeper
- 17 April – Cameron McKenzie-McHarg, former rower
- 15 April – Lauryn Mark, Olympic skeet shooter
- 25 April – Daniel MacPherson, actor
- 9 May – Grant Hackett, swimmer
- 10 May – Pete Gray, environmental activist (d. 2011)
- 16 May – Simon Gerrans, road bicycle racer
- 23 May – Ben Ross, rugby league player
- 24 May – Anthony Minichiello, rugby league player
- 31 May – Craig Bolton, footballer and sportscaster
- 5 June – Chris Flannery, rugby league player
- 18 June – Craig Mottram, long and middle distance runner
- 29 June – James Courtney, motor racing driver
- 9 July
  - Brooke Krueger, hammer thrower
  - Wil Traval, actor
- 23 August – Bronwyn Eagles, hammer thrower
- 24 August – Rachael Carpani, actress
- 10 September - Caterina Mete, dancer, singer and choreographer (The Wiggles)
- 18 September – Chris Tarrant, Australian rules footballer
- 16 October – Timana Tahu, rugby league player
- 5 November – Luke Hemsworth, actor
- 28 November – Alex Greenwich, politician
- 16 December
  - Natalie Porter, basketball player and Olympic medalist
  - Axle Whitehead, actor and singer-songwriter
- 22 December – Matt Parker, recreational mathematician and author
- 25 December – Ricky Muir, politician

== Deaths ==
- 7 January – Eddie Scarf, Olympic wrestler and boxer (b. 1908)
- 2 May – Clarrie Grimmett, cricketer (born in New Zealand) (b. 1891)
- 24 September – Pat Galvin, South Australian politician (b. 1911)
- 11 November – Vince Gair, 27th Premier of Queensland (b. 1901)
- 20 November – Sir John McEwen, 18th Prime Minister of Australia and 1st Deputy Prime Minister of Australia (b. 1900)

== See also ==
- 1980 in Australian literature
- 1980 in Australian television
- List of Australian films of 1980
