= Who Killed Hannah Jane? =

- Based on: Who Killed Hannah Jane? by Tom Molomby
- Written by: Robert Caswell
- Directed by: Peter Fisk
- Starring: Graham Rouse; June Salter; Judi Farr; Edward Howell; Barry Otto
- Country of origin: Australia
- Original language: English

Production
- Producer: Alan Burke
- Running time: 80 minutes

Original release
- Network: ABC
- Release: 1984

Who Killed Hannah Jane? is a 1984 Australian television film about the murder conviction of Arthur Peden directed by Peter Fisk and starring Graham Rouse, June Salter, Judi Farr, Edward Howell, and Barry Otto. It was the third of four telemovies called Verdict produced by the ABC dramatising real cases (the others being The Dean Case, The Amorous Dentist, and The Schippan Mystery).

== Background ==
Based on the 17 May 1921 murder of Gundagai resident, Hannah Jane Peden, and the subsequent June 1921 trial in Sydney, and conviction of her husband, Arthur Bryce Peden. After an appeal, and based on the benefit of the doubt, Peden was released from Long Bay Gaol on 28 February 1922.

== Cast ==
- Graham Rouse - Arthur Peden
- June Salter – Mrs Edwards
- Judi Farr – Hannah Jane Peden
- Edward Howell – Mr Andrews
- Barry Otto – James Harnney
- Jennifer Hagan – Marion Andrews
- Peter Whitford – James Gannon
- Francis Bell – Archibald McDonnell
- John Gregg – William Coyle
- Leonard Teale – Mr Justice Street

== Media ==
- book – Tom Molomby, Who killed Hannah Jane (1981)
- article - D.J. Pounder, The Peden case: an Australian forensic disaster. The Medical Journal of Australia, v.153, no.11-12, (3–17 December 1990), pp. 712–715.
