= Time's Raging =

- Based on: short story from Futility and Other Animals by Frank Moorhouse
- Written by: Sophia Turkiewicz; Frank Moorhouse
- Directed by: Sophia Turkiewicz
- Starring: Judy Morris; Penne Hackforth-Jones
- Country of origin: Australia
- Original language: English

Production
- Producer: Michael Carson
- Running time: 72 minutes

Original release
- Network: ABC
- Release: 1985

Time's Raging is a 1985 Australian television film directed by Sophia Turkiewicz and starring Judy Morris and Penne Hackforth-Jones. The screenplay concerns a 38-year-old woman who wants a baby. It was the third episode on 1985's Sunday Australian Movies series.

== Cast ==
- Judy Morris as Lauren Bennett
- Michael Aitkens as Cam Bennett
- Lewis Fitz-Gerald as David
- Penne Hackforth-Jones as Jane
- David Downer as Jimmy Brockett

== Reception ==
The Age columnist Barbara Hook wrote "Although their crisp and snappy script very occasionally rings hollow, Moorehouse and Turkiewicz have underpinned it with perceptive and evocative moments which carry it off. And so we see the characters, motivated by guilt, fear or just plain cowardice, speak in half sentences and half truths as they try to hang on or let go, and the undercurrents of awkwardness and excitement which rie and fall around new relationships and familiar old ones. They are rarely neatly resolved in life and this telemovie not commit the sin of allowing them to do so in fiction."

In the Age's Green Guide Garrie Hutchinson says "I suppose it was trying to be bittersweet — you know, two lives to be lived, but not together, except that the man was so bone-headed that he didn't arouse any sympathy in me, and nor did the woman for not telling him to nick off as soon as he came back. Nice performances though, smart direction, the whole subject matter rather David Williamson-like, a field he can account for best himself."

In the Sydney Morning Herald's Guide Doug Anderson wrote "Glowing with warmth and soft light. Time's Raging has a sharpness of truth which slices the edges off clichés and presents well-rounded characters sling-slanging their way through the all-too-familiar obstacle course of interpersonal snakes and ladders."

Jacqueline Lee Lewes in the Sun-Herald says "Most of this telemovie was enjoyable with first-class performances from the cast but particularly Judy Morris. But there's a hitch - the Cam character. He is such a yob and so without charm that it's hard to understand what a classy like Lauren saw in him. And even harder to understand why she even considers having him back."
