= 1980 in Australian television =

This article is a summary of 1980 in Australian television.

== Events ==
- 20 January - The 0/10 Network became known as Network Ten to reflect ATV moving from Channel 0 to channel 10.
- 30 January - Australian sitcom Kingswood Country (a spinoff of the Australian comedy sketch series The Naked Vicar Show) starring Ross Higgins premieres on Seven Network.
- 10 May - Seven Network airs the final episode of the Australian comedy series Doctor Down Under.
- 27 May - British comedy drama series Minder premieres on ABC.
- 14 July - A remake of the 1970s Australian game show Great Temptation called Sale of the Century premieres on Nine Network and becomes the biggest hit of the year. Tony Barber who has previously hosted Great Temptation will return to host this remake along with new co-host Victoria Nicolls.
- August - TV Times and TV Guide magazines are amalgamated into TV Week.
- 11 August - Canadian sceptic James Randi was interviewed by Don Lane which ended with a fight about elderly psychic Doris Stokes. As he went to a commercial break he fired Randi from the show, telling him to p**s off.
- 4 September - Australian drama miniseries The Timeless Land debuts on ABC.
- September - The Australian Broadcasting Tribunal refuses the takeover of ATV10 by Rupert Murdoch's News Limited.
- 24 October - Special Broadcasting Service was launched as Channel 0/28.
- 12 November - In the 1980 season finale for Prisoner, Meg Jackson and Bob Morris marry, the Christmas performance and the mineshaft disaster.
- The 1980 Moscow Olympics are televised on Seven Network via satellite.

== Television ==
- 24 October - Channel 0/28

== Debuts ==
Program	Network	Debut date
Arcade	Network Ten	20 January
Kingswood Country	Seven Network	30 January
Timelapse	ABC TV	12 March
Locusts and Wild Honey	ABC TV	13 April
Are You Being Served?	Network Ten	15 June
Sam's Luck	ABC TV	7 July
Sale of the Century	Nine Network	14 July
The Timeless Land	ABC TV	4 September
Home Sweet Home	ABC TV	6 October
All in the Green Year	ABC TV	20 October
Videodisc	ABC TV	27 October

== New international programming ==
- 1 January - (United States) The Duke (Seven Network)
- 2 January - (France) / (Japan) Zoom the White Dolphin (ABC TV)
- 13 January - (United States) Quark (ABC TV)
- 27 January - (United States) 240 Robert (Network Ten)
- 3 February - (United Kingdom) Rebecca (ABC TV)
- 5 February - (United Kingdom) The Omega Factor (ABC TV)
- 7 February - (United Kingdom) Telford's Change (ABC TV)
- 11 February - (United States) The All-New Popeye Show (Seven Network)
- 21 February - (United States) Captain Caveman and the Teen Angels (Seven Network)
- 21 February - (United States) The Dukes of Hazzard (Network Ten)
- 3 March - (United Kingdom) Grange Hill (ABC TV)
- 4 April - (United States) A Connecticut Rabbit in King Arthur's Court (Network Ten - Sydney)
- 22 April - (United States) Beggarman, Thief (Seven Network)
- 26 May - (United States) Fangface (Network Ten)
- 27 May - (United Kingdom) Minder (ABC TV)
- 31 May - (United States) California Fever (Network Ten)
- 4 June - (United States) Jason of Star Command (Nine Network)
- 22 June - (United States) Scooby and Scrappy-Doo (Nine Network)
- 2 July – (United Kingdom) The Paper Lads (Nine Network)
- 5 July - (United States) Godzilla (Seven Network)
- 16 July - (United States) Hagen (Nine Network)
- 2 August - (United States) Space Sentinels (Network Ten)
- 4 August - (United States) Thunder (Network Ten)
- 25 August - (United Kingdom) Ballet Shoes (Nine Network)
- 9 September - (United Kingdom) The Moon Stallion (ABC TV)
- 25 September - (United Kingdom) Hawkmoor (ABC TV)
- 20 October - (United Kingdom) Huntingtower (ABC TV)
- 3 November - (United Kingdom) Pinocchio (ABC TV)
- 16 November - (United States) A New Kind of Family (Seven Network)
- 16 November - (United Kingdom) Leave it to Charlie (ABC TV)
- 17 November - (United States) Beyond Westworld (Seven Network)
- 18 November - (United States) Big Shamus, Little Shamus (Seven Network)
- 19 November - (United States) Me and Maxx (Network Ten)
- 25 November - (United States) Flo (Network Ten)
- 26 November - (United States) The Ropers (Seven Network)
- 2 December - (United States) Mrs. Columbo (Nine Network)
- 3 December - (United States) B.A.D. Cats (Nine Network)
- 4 December - (United States) The Plastic Man Comedy/Adventure Show (Network Ten)
- 9 December - (United Kingdom) Flambards (Nine Network)
- 22 December - (United States) The New Fred and Barney Show (Seven Network)
- 23 December - (United States) Texas (Network Ten)
- 25 December - (United States) Bugs Bunny's Looney Christmas Tales (Network Ten)
- 26 December - (United States) Struck by Lightning (Seven Network)

== Television shows ==
=== 1950s ===
- Mr. Squiggle and Friends (1959–1999)

=== 1960s ===
- Four Corners (1961–present)

=== 1970s ===
- Hey Hey It's Saturday (1971–1999, 2009–2010)
- Young Talent Time (1971–1988)
- Countdown (1974–1987)
- The Don Lane Show (1975–1983)
- 60 Minutes (1979–present)
- Prisoner (1979–1986)
- Doctor Down Under (1979–1980)

=== 1980s ===
- Kingswood Country (1980–1984)
- Sale of the Century (1980–2001)
- Arcade (1980)

== Ending this year ==
Date	Show	Channel	Debut
29 February	Arcade	Network Ten	20 January 1980
10 May	Doctor Down Under	Seven Network	12 February 1979
8 November	Young Ramsay	Seven Network	30 October 1977
24 November	All in the Green Year	ABC TV	20 October 1980
1980	Ask the Leyland Brothers	Nine Network	1976
1980	This Is Your Life	Seven Network	1975

== See also ==
- 1980 in Australia
- List of Australian films of 1980
