= Robert Grubb =

Australian actor (born 1950)

- Born: 31 January 1950 (age 76); Hobart, Tasmania, Australia
- Occupation: Actor
- Spouse: Robin Silver

Robert Grubb (born 31 January 1950) is an Australian actor. He studied acting at the National Institute of Dramatic Art (NIDA), where he graduated in 1978. There he was a fellow student of actor Mel Gibson.

Grubb played the role of Dr. Geoffrey Standish in the popular series The Flying Doctors. He won Australia's Helpmann Award for Best Male Actor in a Supporting Role in a Musical for his stage portrayal of Pop in the Australian production of the Queen musical, We Will Rock You.

In 1998, he played The Wolf and Cinderella’s Prince in the Melbourne Theatre Company's production of Stephen Sondheim’s Into the Woods. In 2016, he played Dimitri Weissman in Sondheim’s Follies at Melbourne Recital Centre. In 2024, he played Max in Sunset Boulevard opposite Sarah Brightman.

He also narrated "Rainforest Beneath the Canopy" in 2004.

As of 2020 Grubb was reprising his previous role of Detective Bill Graves on Neighbours.

Grubb features as Senior Sgt Bill Kirby in Savage River, on ABC TV (and iview), premiering September 2022 and set in country Victoria.

== Filmography ==
=== Film ===
Year	Title	Role	Notes
1979	My Brilliant Career	Frank Hawdon	Feature film
1981	Gallipoli	Billy	Feature film
1983	Phar Lap: Heart of a Nation	William Nielsen	Feature film
1983	The Amorous Dentist	Louis Bertrand	TV movie
1985	Robbery Under Arms	Sir Frederick Morringer	Feature film
1985	Mad Max Beyond Thunderdome	Pig Killer	Feature film
1985	Remember Me	Geoff	TV movie
1990	More Winners	Mr Edmund	TV movie
1997	Paradise Road	Colonel Downes	Feature film
1999	Close Contact	Franklin	TV movie
2000	The Potato Factory	Mr Emmett	TV movie
2000	Waiting at the Royal	Anthony	TV movie
2003	After the Deluge	Simon	TV movie
2004	The Brush Off	Det. Sen. Con. Micaelis	TV movie
2006	The Society Murders	Phil Dunn QC	TV movie
2007	Black Button	Man Behind Desk	Short film
2007	Curtin	Percy Spender	TV movie
2008	The Window	Father	Short film
2009	Remembering Nigel	Himself	
2010	Of Land and Bounty		Short film
2012	Hungry Man	The Worm	Short film
2023	Call Me Chihiro	Bito (English Voice)	

=== Television ===
Year	Title	Role	Notes
1982	Sara Dane	John MacArthur	TV series, 6 episodes
1983	A Country Practice	Nigel Fairbairn	TV series, 4 episodes
1984	Five Mile Creek	Mr Harbottle	TV series, 1 episode
1984	Special Squad	Sims	TV series, 1 episode
1991	All Together Now	Dr Standfish	TV series, 1 episode
1992	Bligh	Shamble	TV series, 1 episode
1986-92	The Flying Doctors	Dr. Geoffrey Standish	TV series, 204 episodes
1993	G.P.	John	TV series, 1 episode
1996	Mercury	Ritchie Munrow	TV series, 2 episodes
1997	State Coroner	Hugh Ferrari	TV series, 3 episodes
1999	High Flyers	Mr Bull	TV series, 26 episodes
2000	Tales of the South Seas		TV series, 1 episode: "The Devil's Pearl"
2000	Thunderstone	Old Noah	TV series, 1 episode
1998-00	SeaChange	Barry Boston	TV series, 5 episodes
2001	Crash Zone	Garrison	TV series, 1 episode
2001	Ponderosa	Ned Covington	TV series, 1 episode
2002	The Secret Life of Us	Mr Lang	TV series, 1 episode
2002	MDA	Andrew Gallin	TV series, 1 episode
2002	Marshall Law	Pedro	TV series, 1 episode
1995-03	Blue Heelers	Neil Pendergast / Derrick Chalmers/ Various	TV series, 5 episodes
2000-04	Stingers	Frank Vellani / Damien Jordan	TV series, 2 episodes
2004	Salem's Lot	Larry Crockett	TV series, 2 episodes
2007	Pirate Islands: The Lost Treasure of Fiji	Salty Ben	TV series, 7 episodes
2007	Bastard Boys	Roger Gyles	TV miniseries
2008	All Saints	Paul Murray	TV series, 1 episode
2008	McLeod's Daughters	Tim Ayres	TV series, 2 episodes
2012	Miss Fisher's Murder Mysteries	Gerald Waddington	TV series, 1 episode
2012	Howzat! Kerry Packer's War	Tagge Webster	TV miniseries, 2 episodes
2013	Reef Doctors	James McGabe	TV series, 3 episodes
2014	The Weatherman	Troy	TV series, 1 episode
2017	Wentworth	Miles Stratham	TV series, 1 episode
2017	Offspring	Julian Moody	TV series, 1 episode
2017–18, 2020	Neighbours	Bill Graves	TV series
2019	NCIS: New Orleans	Musical Live Performance	TV series, 1 episode
2021	The Newsreader	Dr McCormack	TV series, 2 episodes
2022	Savage River	Senior Sergeant Bill Kirby	TV series, 6 episodes
2026	NCIS: Sydney	John Callahan	TV series: 1 episode (3.19 Hunter)
