= Border Patrol (2001 film) =

- Directed by: Mark Haber
- Written by: Miguel Tejada-Flores
- Produced by: Brian Burgess
- Starring: Michael DeLorenzo; Clayton Rohner; Lewis Fitz-Gerald; Mary Elkins; Bianca Nacson
- Music by: Patrick O'Hearn
- Distributed by: Wilshire Court Productions
- Release date: July 12, 2001
- Running time: 90 minutes
- Countries: Australia, United States
- Language: English

Border Patrol is a 2001 Australian-American supernatural action-thriller film directed by Mark Haber and starring Michael DeLorenzo, Clayton Rohner, Lewis Fitz-Gerald, and Mary Elkins. In the film, a cop from the afterlife joins forces with a cop from Miami to stop a killer who has the ability to move between the two worlds and wreak havoc on people and the nature of reality. It is a joint Australia and U.S. production.

== Plot ==
Cal Newman, a law enforcement agent in the afterworld, is given the assignment of catching serial killer Roderick Helms. If successful, Newman can move beyond the level of dealing with the seedy criminals of the afterworld. To assist him, he enlists the help of the person who knows the most about Helms and his crimes, the mortal Freddie Chavez, a Miami policeman.

Most mortals can't see beings from the afterworld, but Chavez has had a near death experience as a result of an encounter with Helms, and the NDE state gave him access to perceive beings moving across the border between two worlds.

The pair have a critically limited time to work within, as Helms has discovered the means to move his body between earth and the afterworld, and if they don't permanently end his existence in less than 24 hours, he will remain forever in an unassailable state. As it doesn't matter how many times Helms is killed in a normal mortal way and he can cross the border between worlds at will to commit his crimes, an otherworldly solution is needed.

Chavez and Newman investigate by moving between worlds, trying to follow the trail left by Helms. As Chavez is mortal but has the perception of beings from the afterworld, his cellular makeup is such that if Helms can kill him and usurp his energy, that will give him the power he needs to remain forever invincible. Heironymous, an otherworldly being, gives Newman and Chavez secret information on how they might go about permanently killing Helms, although it's uncertain and time-critical.

In an attempt to trap Chavez, Helms stealthily and frighteningly visits his daughter Janet, who unwittingly leads Newman and Chavez to Helms. A showdown ensues and mortal power intermingles with transcendent power until Helms is permanently eradicated. As Newman now has his promotion, the film ends with Chavez bidding him farewell as he crosses the threshold in the afterworld.

== Cast ==
- Michael DeLorenzo as Freddie Chavez
- Clayton Rohner as Cal Newman
- Lewis Fitz-Gerald as Roderick Helms
- Mary Elkins as Janet Helms
- Bianca Nacson as Maureen Ryder
- Jacqueline Graham as Emily Wells
- Anthony Brandon Wong as Captain Takeyama
- Tony Harvey as Heironymous
- Michael Scott as Martin Eldridge
- Ian Watkin as Baldy
- Penny Brown-O'Dare as Abuelita
- Kate Doherty as The Nurse
- Bob Newman as The Doctor
- Michael Moore as The Wounded Man
- Michael Bushby as Booking Clerk
- Don Battee as Detective Copeland
- Tom Betts as TVC Director
- Kym Jackson as The Secretary

== Reception ==
Filmdienst described the film as follows: "A richly constructed story with elements from relevant successful films (The Sixth Sense), which provides the usual fantasy entertainment in the form of a thriller." while KinoFIlmWelt wrote that it was a "mystery thriller with clever variations on the in-between realm theme; a detective and gangster story with unusual locations and bizarre characters. Image montages and tricks that are otherwise only known from experimental films create astonishing effects."
