= 1982 in Australia =

- Monarch: Elizabeth II
- Governor-General: Sir Zelman Cowen, then Sir Ninian Stephen
- Prime minister: Malcolm Fraser
- Population: 15,184,247
- Australian of the Year: Edward Williams
- Elections: VIC, TAS, SA

The following lists events that happened during 1982 in Australia.

- Decades: 1960s; 1970s; 1980s; 1990s; 2000s
- See also: 1982 in Australian television; 1982 in Australian literature; Other events of 1982; Timeline of Australian history

== Incumbents ==
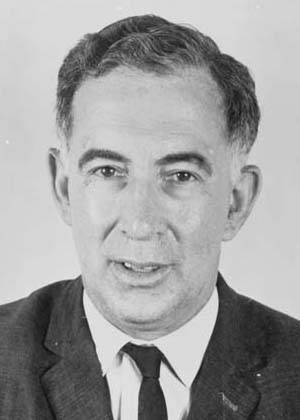
Sir Zelman Cowen

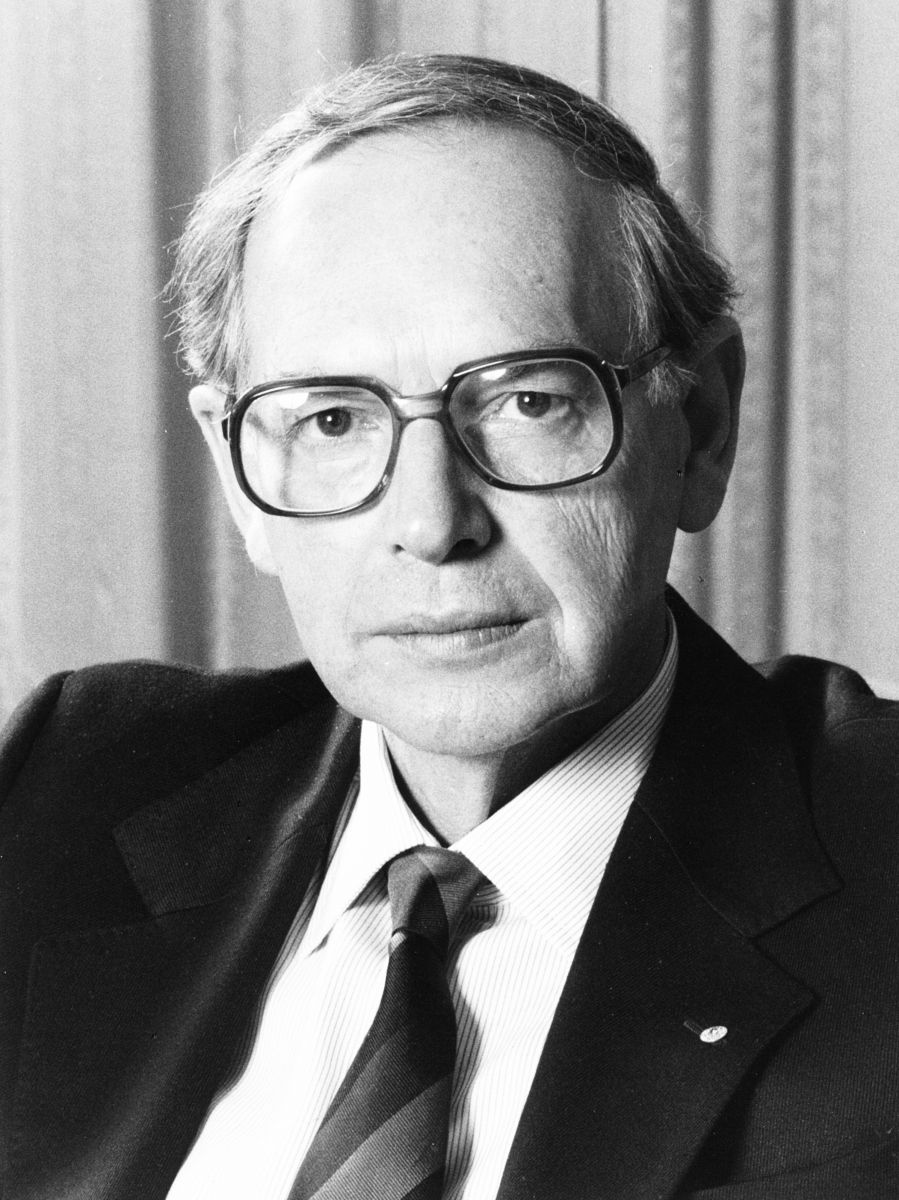
Sir Ninian Stephen

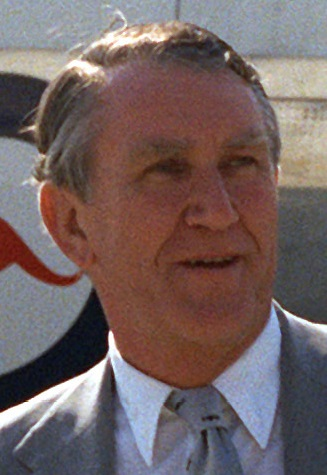
Malcolm Fraser

- Monarch – Elizabeth II
- Governor-General – Sir Zelman Cowen (until 29 July), then Sir Ninian Stephen
- Prime Minister – Malcolm Fraser
  - Deputy Prime Minister – Doug Anthony
  - Opposition Leader – Bill Hayden
- Chief Justice – Sir Harry Gibbs

=== State and territory leaders ===
- Premier of New South Wales – Neville Wran
  - Opposition Leader – John Dowd
- Premier of Queensland – Joh Bjelke-Petersen
  - Opposition Leader – Ed Casey (until 20 October), then Keith Wright
- Premier of South Australia – David Tonkin (until 10 November), then John Bannon
  - Opposition Leader – John Bannon (until 10 November), then John Olsen
- Premier of Tasmania – Harry Holgate (until 26 May), then Robin Gray
  - Opposition Leader – Robin Gray (until 26 May), then Ken Wriedt
- Premier of Victoria – Lindsay Thompson (until 8 April), then John Cain Jr.
  - Opposition Leader – John Cain Jr. (until 8 April), then Lindsay Thompson (until 5 November), then Jeff Kennett
- Premier of Western Australia – Sir Charles Court (until 25 January), then Ray O'Connor
  - Opposition Leader – Brian Burke
- Chief Minister of the Northern Territory – Paul Everingham
  - Opposition Leader – Bob Collins
- Chief Minister of Norfolk Island – David Buffett

=== Governors and administrators ===
- Governor of New South Wales – Sir James Rowland
- Governor of Queensland – Sir James Ramsay
- Governor of South Australia – Sir Keith Seaman (until 28 March), then Sir Donald Dunstan (from 23 April)
- Governor of Tasmania – Sir Stanley Burbury (until 16 March), then Sir James Plimsoll (from 1 October)
- Governor of Victoria – Sir Henry Winneke (until 28 February), then Sir Brian Murray
- Governor of Western Australia – Sir Richard Trowbridge
- Administrator of Norfolk Island – Thomas Paterson (until 27 January), then Raymond Trebilco
- Administrator of the Northern Territory – Eric Johnston

== Events ==
=== January ===
- 5 January – Sir William McMahon announces his retirement from politics after 32 years. His resignation comes at an awkward time for the Federal Government, not keen to test its mid-term popularity in so vulnerable a seat as Lowe.

=== February ===
- 2 February – Lindy Chamberlain is committed for trial for the murder of her daughter Azaria.
- 5 February – A Cessna 411A aircraft crashes into a building at Archerfield Airport. The pilot and four people within the building are killed.
- February 14 Devo on Countdown Tour Rockout Band

=== March ===
- 20 March – Thousands of people walked across the Sydney Harbour Bridge to mark its 50th anniversary.

=== April ===
- 3 April – After almost 27 years in power, the Liberal/National coalition government is voted out in Victoria & is replaced by the ALP
- 6 April – Sir Phillip Lynch steps down as Liberal Party Deputy Leader after 10 years in the position, leaving the way clear for " a younger man".
- 8 April –
  - Andrew Peacock fails in his bid to topple Malcolm Fraser as Liberal leader and Prime Minister, by a 27:54 margin. Treasurer John Howard beats Michael MacKellar 45:27 for the position of Deputy Leader of the Liberal Party.
  - The XPT (Express Passenger Train) commences operation in New South Wales.
- 11 April – Business entrepreneur and adventurer Dick Smith makes a record solo helicopter flight from Sydney to Bundaberg.
- 16 April – Archbishop John Grindrod is appointed as Anglican Primate of Australia, succeeding Sir Marcus Loane.
- 19 April – Federal Health Minister Michael MacKellar and Customs and Excise Minister John Moore resign over Michael MacKellar's failure to declare and pay duty on a colour television set in October 1981.

=== May ===
- 11 May – High Court upholds the Racial Discrimination Act 1975 in Koowarta v Bjelke-Petersen, effectively extending Commonwealth power.
- 15 May – In the middle of the Franklin Dam dispute, the Labor government of Harry Holgate is voted out in Tasmania & replaced by the Liberal Party, led by Robin Gray.

=== June ===
- 5 June – The Premiers and the Commonwealth agree to abolish appeals from the State Supreme Courts to the Privy Council, thus making the High Court of Australia the final court of appeal. Several of the few remaining constitutional links with Britain are also to be severed.
- 18 June – The South Australian Government passes legislation authorising the development of the Roxby Downs copper-uranium deposit, despite controversy over the issue.
- 21 June – The Queensland Art Gallery within the Queensland Cultural Centre is opened. The cost had blown out from the original estimate of $10 million to $28 million.

=== July ===
- 7 July – The Australian Labor Party reverses its policy on uranium mining to allow for the continuation of existing projects.
- 16 July – In response to a leadership challenge by Bob Hawke (which came to a head during the Australian Labor Party National Conference), Bill Hayden resigns, and in a secret vote, retains the leadership by a close 42:37.
- 29 July – Sir Ninian Stephen succeeds Sir Zelman Cowen as Governor-General of Australia.
- 31 July – The Lyric Opera of Queensland is established.

=== August ===
- 2 August – The Daily Sun newspaper begins publication in Brisbane.
- 8 August – The Dalai Lama visits Australia to mark the 30th anniversary of the establishment of Buddhism in the country.
- 15 August – Queensland Government workers, including railway employees, walk out for two days in support of shorter working hours and a general strike results.
- 24 August –
  - The fourth interim report of the Costigan Royal Commission into the Ships Painters and Dockers' Union begins a series of revelations about tax fraud which implicates senior public servants and members of the Liberal Party. The report highlights tax-avoidance schemes, including "bottom of the harbour" plans. The resulting furor ends speculation about an early election.
  - The strike in Queensland ends when unions capitulate before the government's adamant attitude on the issue.

=== September ===
- 26 September – Parachutist Rich Collins accidentally reaches an altitude of 2,800 metres (9,200 ft) during a jump; short of oxygen, he releases his main parachute to lower himself and lands on his reserve chute.
- 30 September – A Cessna 210-5 vanishes on a flight from Atherton to Mount Isa. The five people aboard are presumed to have perished.

=== October ===
- 11 October – Andrew Peacock becomes Industry and Commerce Minister after 18 months on the backbench when ill-health forces Sir Phillip Lynch's resignation from the position and from Parliament.
- 12 October – Elizabeth II officially opens the new building of the National Gallery of Australia in Canberra.

=== November ===
- 6 November – Elections in South Australia see the voting out of the Liberal/National coalition, led by David Tonkin & the election of the ALP, led by John Bannon.
- 10 November – Tasmania's most infamous murder case occurs when lawyer Randall Askeland beats his wife, Wendy Mold, to death with an iron bar whilst she is asleep.

=== December ===
- 1 December – The Commonwealth Freedom of Information Act becomes operative.
- 14 December – The Tasmanian Wilderness Society, led by Bob Brown, stages a blockade of the Franklin Dam site in Tasmania which continues into 1983. On the same day, UNESCO agrees to list the Tasmanian Wild Rivers as a World Heritage Site.
- 17 December – Random Breath Testing is introduced in New South Wales.
- 31 December – The Australian Women's Weekly is first published as a monthly magazine.
- One of Australia's worst-ever droughts strikes the country.

== Arts and literature ==
- Rodney Hall's novel Just Relations wins the Miles Franklin Award

== Film ==
- The Man from Snowy River
- Monkey Grip
- The Year of Living Dangerously

== Television ==
- 18 January – Sons and Daughters premieres on the Seven Network.
- 28 June – The Nine Network premieres its new breakfast TV show, National News Today, which is later shortened to Today
- Nine, Seven & the ABC conduct stereo test transmissions

== Sport ==
- The South Melbourne Swans move to Sydney & become the Sydney Swans.
- The Canberra Raiders and Illawarra Steelers are introduced in the 1982 NSWRFL season.
- 21 March – Robert de Castella represents Australia at the tenth IAAF World Cross Country Championships, staged in Rome, Italy. He finished in tenth place (34:20.5) in the race over 11,978 metres.
- 28 March – The Newtown Jets & Canterbury Bulldogs fight out the only (to date) scoreless draw in NSWRL first grade history.
- 29 March – The Sydney Swans, the first VFL club outside Victoria, play their first home game at the Sydney Cricket Ground (SCG).
- 24 July – The Swans (13.12.90) defeat the North Melbourne Kangaroos (8.10.58) to win the Australian Football Championships Night Series. It is the first major trophy for the Swans since they moved to Sydney.
- 25 July – Robert Wallace wins his second men's national marathon title, clocking 2:16:02 in Brisbane, while Barbara McKerrow claims the women's title in 2:50:28.
- 25 September – Carlton Blues (14.19.103) defeat the Richmond Tigers (12.13.83) to win the 86th VFL premiership. It is the second consecutive premiership for Carlton & the last grand final appearance for 35 years for Richmond.
- 26 September – Minor premiers, the Parramatta Eels, defeat the Manly-Warringah Sea Eagles 21-8^ to win the 75th NSWRL premiership. It is their second consecutive premiership. The Canberra Raiders, in their inaugural season, finish in last position, claiming the wooden spoon.
- 30 September – 9 October – The 1982 Commonwealth Games are held in Brisbane, Queensland
- 2 November – Gurner's Lane wins the Melbourne Cup.
- 18 December – The Kangaroos complete a tour of Great Britain & France undefeated for the first time.

^-Scored under outdated scoring system.

== Births ==
- 8 January – Jonathan Cantwell, racing cyclist (died 2018)
- 14 January
  - Braith Anasta, rugby league player and sportscaster
  - Chris Heighington, rugby league player
- 17 February – Daniel Merriweather, singer-songwriter
- 18 February – Courtney Act, drag queen and singer
- 3 March – Brent Tate, rugby league player
- 15 March – Tom Budge, actor
- 25 April – Victoria Mitchell, long-distance runner
- 22 May – Erin McNaught, 2006 Miss Australia
- 25 May – Justin Hodges, rugby league footballer
- 31 May – Brett Firman, rugby league player
- 11 June – Reni Maitua, rugby league player
- 14 June – Nicole Irving, swimmer
- 7 June – Kurt Gidley, rugby league player
- 5 July – Kate Gynther, water polo player
- 6 July – Bree Robertson, gymnast and actress
- 10 July
  - Sam Fisher, Australian rules footballer
  - Jeffrey Walker, actor and director
- 17 July – Eve van Grafhorst, one of the first Australian children to be infected with HIV via a blood transfusion (died 1993)
- 21 July – Jason Cram, Australian swimmer
- 30 July – Yvonne Strahovski, actress
- 7 August – Abbie Cornish, actress
- 9 August – Daniel Henshall, actor
- 24 August – Damian Istria, gymnast
- 25 August – Nick Gill, Australian rules footballer
- 30 August – Will Davison, racing driver
- 7 September – George Bailey, cricketer
- 17 September – Wade Robson, dancer
- 23 September – Alyssa Sutherland, actress and model
- 27 September – Ella Scott Lynch, actress
- 13 October – Ian Thorpe, swimmer
- 17 October – Nick Riewoldt, Australian rules footballer
- 4 November – Travis Blackley, Major League Baseball player
- 5 November – Rob Swire, musician
- 9 November – Eloise Wellings, long-distance runner
- 22 November – Xavier Doherty, cricketer
- 13 December – Anthony Callea, entertainer
- 31 December
  - Luke Schenscher, basketball player
  - Melissa Leong, Australian television host and food critic

== Deaths ==
- 11 February – Albert Facey, writer and soldier (b. 1894)
- 28 February – William Arthur, New South Wales politician (b. 1918)
- 17 March – Herb Graham, 4th Deputy Premier of Western Australia (b. 1911)
- 14 June – Sir Arthur Coles, Victorian politician, businessman and philanthropist (b. 1892)
- 15 November – Sir Dick Randall, public servant (b. 1906)
- 4 December – Harry Freedman, rabbi, author and translator (b. 1901)

== See also ==
- 1982 in Australian literature
- 1982 in Australian television
- List of Australian films of 1982
