= Sophia Turkiewicz =

Australian film and television director

- Occupation: Director

Sophia Turkiewicz is an Australian film and television director known for her film Silver City. Silver City, which Turkiewicz began during a six-month stay in Poland, was released internationally and won 3 AFI awards. Turkiewicz has also spent six years as a lecturer in the directing department of the Australian Film, Television and Radio School before leaving to direct Once My Mother.

== Filmography ==
=== Film ===
- A Handful of Jelly Babies (1976)
- Letters from Poland (1978)
- Silver City (1984)
- Flame (1995)
- Pacific Drive (1996)
- Once My Mother (2013). Short-listed for the 2015 Betty Roland Prize for Scriptwriting, New South Wales Premier's Literary Awards.

=== Television ===
- Time's Raging (1985)
- I've Come About the Suicide (1987)
- The New Adventures of Black Beauty (1992, episodes Sweet Reward and The Detectives)
- Bananas in Pyjamas (1992, 37 episodes)
- A Country Practice (1994, episodes Little Girl Lost and Family Business)
- Mirror, Mirror (1995, season 1, episodes 6 - 10 and 16 - 20)
- The Wayne Manifesto (1996, director of 4 episodes)
- Driven Crazy (1998, episodes 1–4)
- Something in the Air (2001, eight episodes)
- Escape of the Artful Dodger (2002, six episodes)
