= The Amorous Dentist =

- Based on: The Amorous Dentist: A True Story by Robert Travers
- Written by: Ted Roberts
- Directed by: Peter Fisk
- Starring: Robert Grubb
- Country of origin: Australia
- Original language: English

Production
- Producer: Alan Burke
- Running time: 75 mins

Original release
- Network: ABC
- Release: 1983

The Amorous Dentist is a 1983 Australian television film which was the second of four telemovies called Verdict produced by the ABC dramatising real cases (the others being The Dean Case, Who Killed Hannah Jane?, and The Schippan Mystery). It is based on the case of Dr Louis Bertrand.

== Premise ==
In 1865, Sydney-based dentist Dr Louis Bertrand falls in love with a patient's wife. When the patient dies he is arrested for murder.

== Cast ==
- Robert Grubb as Dr. Louis Bertrand
- Juliet Jordan as Maria Kinder
- Robin Bowering as Henry Kinder
- David Atkins as Alfred Burne
- Rhys McConnochie
- Elaine Mangan as Jane Bertrand
- Ron Haddrick as Butler

== Reception ==
Paul Bailey of The Sydney Morning Herald says historical drama has "stylish costumes, lavish sets and a script which is as charming as it is inconsequential." He writes it "might put the occasional smile on your face but it will never produce a hearty guffaw". The Age's Damien Kingsbury notes "This ABC-produced drama is so melodramatic in places that it is hard to take at all seriously; yet the storyline comes from a book about one of the most celebrated court cases of 19th century Sydney." later saying "there is a small twist in the direction of the play and it finishes on a pathetic and anti-climactic note, the animal passions and violence which carried it well and truly dispersed." Also in the Age Brian Courtis writes "There is undue concentration on the gorier marvels produced by make-up and not enough on the pace of the show. It grinds on and on, like one of those old-fashioned dentist's drills bearing down on a stubborn tooth."
