= Five Mile Creek =

1980s Australian television series

- Genre: Drama
- Based on: The Cherokee Trail by Louis L'Amour
- Written by: David Boutland; Tom Hegarty
- Directed by: Frank Arnold; Gary Conway
- Starring: Louise Caire Clark; Liz Burch; Jay Kerr; Rod Mullinar; Michael Caton; Gus Mercurio; Priscilla Weems; Martin Lewis; Nicole Kidman
- Country of origin: Australia
- Original language: English
- No. of seasons: 3
- No. of episodes: 39

Production
- Running time: 46 minutes

Original release
- Network: Seven Network
- Release: 4 November 1983 – 7 August 1985

Five Mile Creek is a western television drama series adapted from Louis L'Amour's novel The Cherokee Trail and produced in Australia. It starred Liz Burch, Louise Caire Clark, Rod Mullinar, Jay Kerr, Michael Caton, Peter Carroll, Gus Mercurio, Martin Lewis, Priscilla Weems and Nicole Kidman. It also featured a then-unknown Asher Keddie in her film debut. Jonathan Frakes was a guest star as Maggie's estranged husband, Adam Scott. The series aired on the Disney Channel in the US in the 1980s.

== Cast ==
=== Main ===
- Louise Caire Clark as Maggie Scott
- Liz Burch as Kate Wallace
- Jay Kerr as Con Madigan
- Rod Mullinar as Jack Taylor
- Michael Caton as Paddy Malone
- Gus Mercurio as Ben Jones
- Priscilla Weems as Hannah Scott
- Martin Lewis as Sam Sawyer
- Nicole Kidman as Annie
- Peter Carroll as Charles Withers
- Scott McGregor as Edward Armstrong

=== Guests ===
Actor	Role	Eps.
Andrew McKaige	Drunk #1	1
Anna Maria Monticelli		1
Anne Scott-Pendlebury	Mrs Clinton	1
Arthur Dignam	Arthur Archer	1
Asher Keddie	Emma	1
Beth Buchanan	Bessie	1
Bob Hornery	Mr Wheen	1
Brett Climo	Brennan	1
Chris Haywood	McCrea	1
Dinah Shearing	Mrs Armstrong	5
Don Crosby	Doctor	1
Garry McDonald	Simon Galt	1
Gerard Kennedy	Mr O'Bannion	1
Gia Carides	Beth	1
Graham Kennedy	Walker the Hawker	1
Greg Stone		
Heather Mitchell	Jocelyn	1
Helen Buday	Bess	1
Hugh Keays-Byrne	Bill Carruthers	1
James Healey	Eddie Wallace	1
Joanna Lockwood	Madelaine	1
John Jarratt	Brodie	1
John McTernan	Father Jenkins	1
John Orcsik	Frank Moore	1
John Sheerin	Mr Barton	1
John Walton	Harrison Miller	1
John Waters	Cameron	1
Jon Blake	Trooper Wilson	1
Jonathan Frakes	Adam Scott	1
Jonathan Sweet	Collinson	1
Lewis Fitz-Gerald	Nigel	1
Linda Cropper	Tillie	1
Melissa Jaffer	Mrs O'Bannion	1
Michael Aitkens	McStay	1
Noel Hodda	Mr Little	1
Norman Coburn	Stage Coach Passenger (uncredited)	1
Pat Bishop	Muriel Bostock	1
Patricia Kennedy	Lillie	1
Peter Fisher	Slim	1
Peter Sumner	Lucas Morgan	1
Peter Whitford	Mr Anderson	1
Ralph Cotterill	Doctor Gluck	1
Ray Barrett	Harry	1
Ray Meagher	Lightning Ridge	1
Rebecca Gilling	Miss Armstrong	1
Reg Evans	Fred Finnegan	1
Rob Steele	Mr Hawkins	1
Robert Coleby	Oliver Hamilton	1
Robert Grubb	Mr Harbottle	1
Serge Lazareff	Mickey	1
Simon Chilvers	Lord Rivers	1
Stefan Dennis	Boy #2	1
Susan Lyons	Miss Parling	1
Tamsin Carroll	Extra	
Tommy Dysart	Trantor	1
Tony Barry	Mr Drummond	1
Wendy Hughes	Arabella	1

== Production ==
The first two seasons cost $12 million to make. The show was popular on the Disney Channel in the US but struggled in the ratings in Australia.

== Episodes ==
=== Season 1 (1983–84) ===
No. overall	No. in season	Title	Directed by	Written by	Original release date
1	1	"Making Tracks"	George Miller	Graham Foreman	4 November 1983
When Maggie arrives at Five Mile Creek, her husband is nowhere to be found, no other letters explaining his whereabouts, and no one has heard or seen anything of him. Meanwhile, the way-station and the stage coach are constantly being held-up by outlaws and bush-rangers, who try to run Five Mile Creek out of business.
2	2	"Horses for Courses"	Frank Arnold	Gwenda Marsh	11 November 1983
Ben Jones arrives from the United States with team of horses for The Australian Express; Maggie offers to raise a juvenile bushranger with the proper care and education, and "Backer" Bowman visits Five Mile Creek, trying to discourage The Australian Express out of business.
3	3	"Love Before a Fall"	Di Drew	Sarah Crawford	7 December 1983
A mysterious traveler arrives at Five Mile Creek and immediately falls in love with Kate, who also shares the same feelings for him, but he holds a shocking secret that can lead to trouble for The Australian Express. Meanwhile, Sam and Kate have trouble getting along.
4	4	"A Few Surprises"	Frank Arnold	Michael Joshua	21 December 1983
While rounding up horses for the coach line, Jacks falls from his horse and injures his knee. He comes down with a deadly fever, and it's up to Paddy to cure him with a native potion. Meanwhile, Mr. Withers' snobbish friends visit Five Mile Creek with Lord David Rivers from London, and Sam is accused of being a thief.
5	5	"The Scrub Bulls"	Chris Thomson	Denise Morgan	4 January 1984
As The Australian Express booms with business, Con and Jack make plans to expand. But they run into trouble when a stubborn neighboring squatter insists that the land the men have purchased is rightfully his. When a feud breaks out, it's the squatter's wife that manages to calm the troubled waters.
6	6	"Bang the Big Drum"	Michael Jenkins	Michael Joshua	18 January 1984
Maggie is informed that her missing husband is a bushranger, but keeps it a secret from Hannah; Sam eavesdrops on Maggie and Kate and learns of the secret. When he spills the beans to Hannah, she runs away to go back home to America and it's up to him to find her when she gets lost.
7	7	"Gold Fever"	Kevin James Dobson	Graham Foreman	1 February 1984
Adam finally arrives at the way station, with intentions of taking Maggie and Hannah with him. With a bounty still out for him, Maggie thinks better of the situation and tells him that she and Hannah will come only when he can assure them that he has made the kind of life that she and Hannah would be willing to share with him. Guest Star: Jonathan Frakes
8	8	"Annie"	Brendan Maher	Greg Millin	15 February 1984
A pregnant woman traveling to Wilga in search of her husband stops at the way station for a night's board, and ends up going into labor. It's then up to Con to go search for her husband and bring him back to Five Mile Creek. Meanwhile, Maggie is distraught over being separated from Adam again and takes her aggrivation out on everyone, especially Sam. Guest Star: Hugh Keays-Byrne
9	9	"Home and Away"	David Stevens	Michael Joshua	7 March 1984
When Harry, a handyman from a neighboring farm is dismissed, Kate lets him stay at The Haven as her guest. When Jack signs responsibility for a shipment of gold and the gold is later stolen in a hold-up by bushrangers, Jack becomes suspicious of Harry for having showed up at Five Mile Creek the same time as the hold-up. Meanwhile, Con is furious with Jack for having signed off on the gold and demands Jack to get on the search for it. Also, Maggie receives a letter from her parents who want for her and Hannah to come back to the States, and must decide on going back home or staying with her newfound friends.
10	10	"The Awakening"	Frank Arnold	Denise Morgan	21 March 1984
Mr. Swenson, the editor for The Chronicle in Wilga, calls Kate an "immoral" woman when she stands up for a stage woman who performs in the saloon after she and her manager are thrown out of their hotel room. Kate invites them to stay at Five Mile Creek, where they offer Sam a job on tour with them and he seriously considers the career change. Mr. Swenson also causes havoc when he overhears that the people of Five Mile Creek are helping aborigines, who dwell on Kate's property, and is determined to have them thrown off her land, in fear that they will spread diseases.
11	11	"The Prize"	Kevin James Dobson	Sarah Crawford	4 April 1984
The Australian Express takes interest in the mail contract, but another businessman from out-of-town has his eyes set on it as well. The resolution is a boxing match between Con and the out-of-towner. When Con gets injured the night before the match, taking him completely out of the fight, it's up to Jack to stand in for Con.
12	12	"Tricks of the Trade"	Gary Conway	Gwenda Marsh	18 April 1984
Sam's godparents arrive to take him with them to the east coast, but he refuses to leave with them. Meanwhile, Con and Kate discover an interest in each other.
13	13	"Thanksgiving"	Brian Trenchard-Smith	Sarah Crawford	2 May 1984
Maggie learns that Adam has been killed, but she tries to make the best of things by holding a Thanksgiving Day celebration at Five Mile Creek. The holiday however could be ruined when Jack plans to sell the Australian Express to another coach line against Con's will.

=== Season 2 (1984) ===
No. overall	No. in season	Title	Directed by	Written by	Original release date
14	1	"Hangman's Noose"	Gary Conway	Graham Foreman	16 May 1984
When "Redhat", a famous bushranger, and his gang hold up the way station and the coach line, he is mysteriously shot to death and Jack is framed for the murder. When Jack is convicted and sentenced to hang, it's up to Paddy to search for the real murderer and bring him to justice.
15	2	"The Challenge"	Kevin James Dobson	Sarah Crawford	6 June 1984
To the dismay of the men, another stage coach company moves in across from the way station, providing customers with another means of transportation back and forth to Wilga and Port Nelson. To keep the route with the Australian Express, Con wagers a bet with the stage coach driver: a stage coach race; winner keeps the routes between the two towns.
16	3	"Blood, Sweat and Faith"	Brian Trenchard-Smith	David Boutland	20 June 1984
Involved in another hold-up, Ben is shot and paralyzed. After he is operated on, Hannah manages to lift his spirits. Meanwhile, Maggie seeks faith in God when she wants to have an abandoned church building moved to the Five Mile Creek property.
17	4	"Mail Order Brides"	Kevin James Dobson	Denise Morgan	4 July 1984
Three unmarried women visit Five Mile Creek, each in search for a man. When they set their sights on the men of The Australian Express, causing the men to lose concentration on their work, it's up to Maggie and Kate to become matchmakers.
18	5	"Maggie"	Brendan Maher	Keith Thompson	18 July 1984
Death shatters Maggie's life once again when she receives word that her parents have died from an outbreak of cholera. Meanwhile, the people of Five Mile Creek get to the bottom of a mysterious stage coach accident along the road with injured passengers, where Sam also learns a lesson in death.
19	6	"When The Kookaburra Sings"	Kevin James Dobson	Sarah Crawford	1 August 1984
Jack begins arriving late with the coach and when confronted, he decides to take a holiday, only to reveal that he is in love and wants to marry the lady. She, however, is a widow, who considers whether to move on and accept his proposal, or be her own woman.
20	7	"Walk Like A Man"	Rob Stewart	Gwenda Marsh	15 August 1984
A bounty hunter makes his way through Five Mile Creek. Sam takes an instant liking to the Alpha male persona, but things turn for the worse when it appears that a wanted man may have been staying at Five Mile Creek.
21	8	"Across The Great Divide"	Brendan Maher	Keith Thompson	5 September 1984
When wildfires rage through the outback, causing Wilga to burn, the hopes, dreams, works, and lives at The Haven stand in grave danger. The fire also brings back haunting memories for Con, and a boarding family gets lost, attempting to escape the burning outback by journeying across the Great Divide.
22	9	"Missing, Presumed Lost"	Kevin James Dobson	David Boutland and Tom Hegarty	19 September 1984
When Maggie and Paddy take the school children on an afternoon outing, the women mysteriously vanish. The men of Five Mile Creek discover the girls locked in an abandoned cabin, but Maggie and Hannah are nowhere to be found. A massive search party is formed to search for the missing Scotts. Meanwhile, Charlie Withers gets to the bottom of things when he discovers that a breach of security has taken place in his bank.
23	10	"Matchmaker"	Brendan Maher	Sarah Crawford	3 October 1984
When a boarding school of girls visit Five Mile Creek, Hannah discovers her dream: to go to school, but she feels guilty about leaving her mother on her own, so she plays Cupid and sets Maggie up with Jack, and with Charlie Withers. They both propose, leaving Maggie with a major decision of either accepting one or the other, or staying on her own.
24	11	"Good Old Reliable Me"	Kevin James Dobson	Sarah Crawford	17 October 1984
Kate is informed that Eddie has gambled away the deed to Five Mile Creek and the new owner's new working conditions causes her to quit and start life over in Port Nelson. It's then up to the men to scheme a way to get her back: a poker game.
25	12	"Women of Means"	Gary Conway	Denise Morgan	7 November 1984
With Wilga being a ghost town after the fire, The Australian Express' business is poor, and Charles informs the men that it could be hurtling toward extinction. The men then consider selling one of the coaches for extra cash. Meanwhile, Charles manages the inheritance that Maggie has received since her parents' passing.
26	13	"The Last Round Up"	Kevin James Dobson	Tom Hegarty	5 December 1984
Charles announces that he is retiring, and everyone makes a decision on selling Five Mile Creek and moving to the Emu Plains.

=== Season 3 (1985) ===
No. overall	No. in season	Title	Directed by	Written by	Original release date
27	1	"Travellers' Tales"	Kevin James Dobson	Keith Thompson	2 January 1985
Journeying 500 miles across the continent to the new establishment becomes stressful for the Five Mile Creek family as they run into constant misfortunes along the way.
28	2	"The Gauntlet"	Brian Trenchard-Smith	Sarah Crawford	6 February 1985
Arriving in the Emu Plains, the town gives the Five Mile Creek family eerie feelings, as they are given the cold shoulder. Possessing the new way station is harder than expected, as they must convince the current owner that they are not working for the Armstrongs, the richest family in town who plans to scare The Australian Express back to New South Wales.
29	3	"Real Cowboys Play Fair"	Gary Conway	Sarah Crawford	6 March 1985
The people of Five Mile Creek are hit with more disaster as Con is injured when a mysterious bushranger throws dynamite in the coach he's driving, shattering the Charlie Wither's Flyer. They confront the Armstrongs, who maintain their innocence, but later stumble on a surprising twist. Meanwhile, Annie takes up work for Five Mile Creek.
30	4	"Possum"	Kevin James Dobson	Henry Crawford	20 March 1985
A young girl applies her deadbeat father for a job at the way station and he is hired. She misses out a lot on life to make sure he stays straight, but when she and Sam are rescued from a caved-in old mineshaft, he becomes the father he should be. Meanwhile, the Australian Express have more trouble with the Armstrongs when they close the bridge to their coachline, leading them to take a long detour.
31	5	"The Best of Mates"	Kevin James Dobson	Denise Morgan	3 April 1985
Kate struggles to get the hired hands to respect her as boss. Meanwhile, Annie has become smitten with Jack.
32	6	"The Gold Cup"	Kevin James Dobson	Peter A. Kinloch	17 April 1985
Edward Armstrong outbids Con and Jack on a stallion with the intent to race him in the local Gold Cup race. He makes a wager with Jack against the field, leading the Australian Express to support Matt Buckland, a former Pony Express rider who beat them out for the mail contract. Meanwhile, Maggie and Kate inspire the townsfolk to stand up to the Armstrongs.
33	7	"A Dog Called Johnson"	Gary Conway	Denise Morgan	1 May 1985
Jack's mother visits Five Mile Creek with her border collie in tow.
34	8	"A Fish Out of Water"	Brendan Maher	Denise Morgan	15 May 1985
Maggie becomes smitten by dashing Scottish sea captain Michael Callaghan, who is considering selling his boat for a parcel of land, much to Jack's dismay. Sam becomes obsessed with racing Matt, leading Matt's horse, the Countess, to fall victim to a potentially deadly illness.
35	9	"The Great Coach Race"	Kevin James Dobson	Peter A. Kinloch	5 June 1985
A childish quibble between Annie and Matt over who is a better coach driver, Con or Jack, leads to a full blown race between the two partners, egged on by Charlie, who sees an opportunity to promote the coachline and his new, specially improved coach.
36	10	"A Death in the Family"	Brendan Maher	Denise Morgan	19 June 1985
Bushrangers hold up the stage coach yet again, and Matt and another passenger are shot. Matt survives, but the passenger dies and a familiar character is revealed as the murderer. Meanwhile, Maggie takes charge in building the town's first hospital, and Kate breaks her engagement to Con.
37	11	"A Lot of Hot Air"	Kevin James Dobson	Peter A. Kinloch	3 July 1985
Jack and Charlie compete in the mayoral election for Emu Plains.
38	12	"One Fine Day"	Brendan Maher	Sarah Crawford	17 July 1985
Death visits the Five Mile Creek family in a bank hold-up.
39	13	"America"	Kevin James Dobson	Tom Hegarty	7 August 1985
Con is offered the chance to return to the United States and run coach lines all across New Mexico. He asks Kate to marry him, so they can go to America together, but she turns him down, then later changes her mind when she sees he is serious this time. Maggie breaks down over Charles' death and losing her best friend, and Sam fears he will be forgotten when Con and Kate settle in America.

== Home releases ==
Only Season One of Five Mile Creek has been released on DVD. No release information is known for Seasons Two and Three on DVD.
