= Kelvin Robertson =

Australian basketball player

Personal information
- Born: 3 January 1983 (age 43) Townsville, Queensland
- Listed height: 5 ft 11 in (1.80 m)
- Listed weight: 181 lb (82 kg)

Career information
- Playing career: 2001–2010
- Position: Point guard

Career history
- 2001–2010: Townsville Crocodiles

Career highlights
- QBL State Division All-League Team (2002); QBL Super 8 Division U/23 Youth Player of the Year (2003)

Kelvin Robertson (born 3 January 1983) is an Australian former professional basketball player who played his entire career with the Townsville Crocodiles of the National Basketball League. A local product, he suffered two knee injuries in 2009 that required reconstructions, forcing him into early retirement.
