= The Dean Case =

- Genre: Drama
- Written by: Brian Bell
- Directed by: Kevin Dobson
- Starring: Lewis Fitz-Gerald; Ivar Kants
- Country of origin: Australia
- Original language: English

Production
- Producer: Alan Burke
- Production company: ABC

Original release
- Release: February 26, 1983

The Dean Case is a 1983 Australian TV movie which was the first of four telemovies called Verdict produced by the ABC dramatising real cases (the others being The Amorous Dentist, Who Killed Hannah Jane?, and The Schippan Mystery).

== Plot ==
The movie tells the story of George Dean, a Sydney-based ferry boat master, arrested in 1895 for attempting to poison his wife.

== Cast ==
- Lewis Fitz-Gerald as George Dean
- Paul Mason as Paddy Crick
- Lola Brooks as Mrs. Seymour
- Celia De Burgh as Mary Dean
- Ivar Kants
