= Catherine Gaskin =

Irish-Australian romance novelist

- Born: 2 April 1929; Louth (County), Ireland
- Died: 6 September 2009 (aged 79–80); Sydney, New South Wales
- Occupation: novelist
- Writing career
- Language: English
- Years active: 1946–1988
- Notable work: Sara Dane

Catherine Gaskin (2 April 1929 – 6 September 2009) was an Irish–Australian romance novelist.

== Biography ==
Gaskin was born in Dundalk Bay, County Louth, Ireland in 1929. When she was only three months old, her parents moved to Australia, settling in Coogee, a suburb of Sydney, where she grew up. Her first novel This Other Eden, was written when she was 15 and published two years later. After her second novel, With Every Year, was published, she moved to London. Three best-sellers followed: Dust in Sunlight (1950), All Else is Folly (1951), and Daughter of the House (1952).

She completed her best-known work, Sara Dane, on her 25th birthday in 1954, and it was published in 1955. It sold more than 2 million copies, was translated into a number of other languages, and was made into a television mini-series in Australia in 1982. This novel is loosely based on the life of the Australian convict businesswoman Mary Reibey, whose image has appeared on the Australian $20 note since 1994. Other novels included A Falcon for a Queen (1972) and The Summer of the Spanish Woman (1977).

Gaskin moved to Manhattan with her newly-married husband, Sol Cornberg, who was a United States citizen. The couple lived there for 10 years; Gaskin became a naturalized US citizen during that period. She and Sol then moved to the Virgin Islands, then in 1967 to Ireland, where she became an Irish citizen. They also lived on the Isle of Man. Her last novel was The Charmed Circle (1988). After her husband died, she returned to Sydney, where she died in September 2009, aged 80, from ovarian cancer.

== Selected works ==
=== Novels ===
- This Other Eden (1947)
- With Every Year (1948)
- Dust in Sunlight (1950)
- All Else Is Folly (1951)
- Daughter of the House (1952)
- Sara Dane (1954)
- Blake's Reach (1958)
- Corporation Wife (1960)
- I Know My Love (1962)
- The Tilsit Inheritance (1963)
- The File on Devlin (1965)
- Edge of Glass (1967)
- Fiona (1970)
- A Falcon for a Queen (1972)
- The Property of a Gentleman (1974)
- The Lynmara Legacy (1975)
- The Summer of the Spanish Woman (1977)
- Family Affairs (1980)
- Promises (1982)
- The Ambassador's Women (1985)
- The Charmed Circle (1988)

=== Collections ===
- Selected Works (1978)

== References and sources ==
Sources

- Obituary, The Age, 24 September 2009, p. 25
