= Juliet Jordan =

Australian actress

- Occupation: Actress
- Notable work: Sara Dane

Juliet Jordan is an English born Australian actress. She played the title role in Sara Dane, and lead roles in the ABC telemovie The Amorous Dentist and the comedy film A Slice of Life. On stage she co starred in Talley's Folly at the Ensemble Theatre in 1983.

Jordan was born in England and moved to Australia as a teenager. She studied at Smith University in the United States and at the London Academy of Music and Dramatic Art. She returned to Australia to film her first role as Sara Dane.
