= Martin Lewis (Australian actor) =

Australian actor

Martin Lewis (born 1970) has appeared in various films and shows including Danny Deckchair, Fatty Finn and the series Five Mile Creek. In 1985 he won a Young Artist Award - 'Best Young Actor in a Foreign Film' for his role in Five Mile Creek. Lewis traveled and danced with the Australian Ballet Company after he quit acting.

Lewis was also a presenter of the Australian Broadcasting Corporation children's ecological program Earthwatch.

== Filmography ==
- 1980 Fatty Finn - Skeet
- 1981–82 A Country Practice - Luke/Peter
- 1983–85 Five Mile Creek - Sam Sawyer
- 1986 Platypus Cove - Peter Nelson
- 1988 Two Brothers Running - Silas Bornstein
- 2003 Danny Deckchair - Macadamia Ball Man
