= Ritter's Cove =

- Genre: Adventure
- Written by: Barbara Brown; Lyal Brown
- Starring: Hans Caninenberg; Susan Hogan; Dale Walters; Craig Kelly
- Countries of origin: Canada; Germany; United Kingdom
- Original language: English
- No. of seasons: 1

Production
- Executive producer: Peter Kelly
- Producer: David Pears
- Production location: British Columbia
- Running time: 30 minutes
- Production companies: CBC (Canada); Taurus Films (Germany); Global Television (UK)

Original release
- Network: CBC Television
- Release: 19 September 1980 – 20 March 1981

Ritter's Cove (German title Die Küstenpiloten, or "The Pilots on the Coast") is an adventure television series which aired on CBC Television from 1980 to 1981, co-produced by Canadian, West German and British companies.

== Premise ==
Karl Ritter (Hans Caninenberg) is an aging pilot whose licence was revoked after failing to complete a medical test. He employs Kate Ashcroft (Susan Hogan) to fly his aircraft, in order to continue his transport company. Episodes highlighted the gender and generation gaps between Ritter and Ashcroft. Other primary series characters included Robert (Dale Walters) and Arnie (Craig Kelly).

Ritter's Cove was cancelled after one season. It was once considered to be a potential replacement for The Beachcombers, a CBC Television adventure series which ran from 1972 to 1990.

== Scheduling ==
In Canada, this half-hour series was originally broadcast on CBC Fridays at 8:00 p.m. (Eastern time) from 19 September 1980 to 20 March 1981. Its only season was rebroadcast on CBC Wednesdays at 4:00 p.m. from 14 October 1981 to 31 March 1982.
