= Sara Dane =

- Based on: Sara Dane by Catherine Gaskin
- Written by: Alan Seymour
- Directed by: Gary Conway; Rod Hardy
- Starring: Juliet Jordan; Harold Hopkins; Brenton Whittle; Ron Parry
- Country of origin: Australia
- Original language: English
- No. of episodes: 8

Production
- Producers: Jock Blair; John Barningham
- Cinematography: Ernie Clark
- Editor: Philip Reid
- Running time: 248 mins
- Budget: $1.5 million

Original release
- Network: Network Ten
- Release: 31 May – 26 July 1982

Sara Dane is a 1982 Australian television miniseries about a woman transported from England to Australia for a crime she did not commit.

== Original novel ==
The mini-series was based on the best-selling 1954 novel of the same name by Catherine Gaskin. Gaskin had spent two years researching the book, which was inspired by the true story of Mary Reibey, a woman convict who married an officer while travelling to Australia, went on to become a successful businesswoman in her own right, and whose image has been featured since 1994 on the Australian $20 note.

The novel was Gaskin's most successful, selling over two million copies. Film rights were sold and Gaskin announced in 1955 that a movie version would be made at Elstree Studios the following year, but this did not occur. Neither did another proposed production starring Sylvia Syms.

=== 1956 radio adaptation ===
The novel was adapted for radio in 1956 by the ABC.

== Plot ==
Sara Dane, who was falsely accused and convicted of stealing, is among a group of women convicts aboard an English ship bound for Sydney Town. Australia in 1797. Halfway through the voyage, she is taken from the ship's prison hold to serve as a maid to a migrating settler, James Ryder and his family. Stripped of her convict rags, bathed and decently dressed, Sara is surprisingly attractive and proves to be well educated and intelligent.

This changed Sara catches the eye of one of the ship's officers, Andrew McClay, who soon falls in love with her and proposes. Against all advice, McClay marries Sara and buys her freedom, but she soon becomes the object of gossip and animosity - the local society refuses to accept her; even her own servants treat her with envy and suspicion, but they all underestimate Sara, who devotes all her energies to her husband's business interests. Very soon they are prospering and as their wealth grows, McClay is able to buy what Sara desperately needs and wants - respectability. For a brief time the former convict girl is warmly received at Government House and welcomed at glittering parties.

However, everything changes when McClay is killed in the Irish Convict Rebellion. There are no more party invitations for Sara, no more guests at her fashionable townhouse. Sara Dane is ostracized once again.

To regain her social status and standing in the community, Sara marries Louis de Bourget, a wealthy aristocrat who fled the French Revolution. This union allows Sara to become the wealthiest woman in colonial Australia. With this newfound power and social status, she can no longer be insulted or ignored.

Then, Louis de Bourget is killed in a riding accident and Sara becomes widowed for a second time. She decides to take her children and return to England, but once in London, Sara no longer feels England to be her 'home country'. She yearns for Australia and the freedom of her adopted land. So Sara once again sails halfway across the world to Australia again, but this time by choice: not as a convicted thief, but as a woman of wealth, power and status.

== Cast ==
Major characters

- Juliet Jordan as Sara Dane
- Harold Hopkins as Andrew McClay
- Brenton Whittle as Jeremy Hogan
- Barry Quin as Richard Barwell
- Sean Scully as Louis de Bourget

Secondary cast

- Ilona Rodgers as Julia Ryder
- Paul Sonkkila as James Ryder
- Robert Grubb as John Macarthur
- Judy Dick as Annie Stokes
- Peta Toppano as Alison Barwell
- Henry Salter as Ted O'Malley
- Wayne Bell as Mr. Clapmore
- Roger Oakley as Major Foveaux
- Roger Ward as Johnny Pigman
- Damon Herriman as David
- Michael Pope as David
- Cameron Scott as Duncan
- Graham Harvey as Duncan
- Amanda Muggleton as Nell Finnigan
- Edwin Hodgeman as Governor King

== Production ==
In 1980 it was announced that the South Australian Film Corporation would make a mini-series of the novel for Network Ten, possibly starring Judy Morris and Sam Neill. Eventually Juliet Jordan was cast. Gaskin later said that Juliet was "not at all what I expected in Sara ... but I'm more than delighted Juliet was cast ... My young Sara was supposed to be a very strong character. You would have had to have been, to have survived and succeeded in the early days of Australia. If anything, the television Sara is even stronger than the novel's leading character in the end."

== Reception ==
It was a ratings success.

== Soundtrack ==
A soundtrack was released in 1982 by Cherry Pie.

=== Charts ===
Chart (1982)	Peak position
Australia (Kent Music Report)	86
