= The Schippan Mystery =

- Written by: Kenneth G. Ross
- Directed by: Di Drew
- Starring: Joseph Fürst
- Music by: Warren Abeshouse
- Country of origin: Australia
- Original language: English

Production
- Producer: Alan Burke
- Editor: Trevor Miller
- Running time: 86 minutes
- Production company: ABC

Original release
- Release: 22 September 1984

The Schippan Mystery is a 1984 Australian television film about the murder of Bertha Schippan in 1902. Written by Kenneth G. Ross, and directed by Di Drew, it was last of four telemovies called Verdict produced by the ABC dramatising real cases (the others being The Dean Case, The Amorous Dentist and Who Killed Hannah Jane?). It is the only one of the four cases set outside of New South Wales.

== Background ==
On 1 January 1902, 13-year-old Bertha Schippan was murdered in Towitta, South Australia. Her sister, Mary, was initially arrested and tried for the crime, but was acquitted.

== Cast ==
- Sally McKenzie - Mary Schippan
- Brandon Burke - Gustave Nitschke
- Joseph Fürst - Mathias Schippan
- Dorothy Alison - Mrs. Schippan
- Desiree Smith - Bertha Schippan
- Michael Winchester - August Schippan
- Yves Stening - Willie Schippan
- Martin Vaughan - Detective Edward Priest
- Arthur Dignam - Sir Josiah Symon
- Matthew O'Sullivan - Mr. Stuart
- Julieanne Newbould
- Peter Dahlsen
