= Michael Winchester =

Australian actor

- Born: Malaysia
- Occupation: Actor
- Known for: Prisoner, Sons and Daughters

Michael Winchester is a Malaysian-born Australian actor, best known for being the third actor to play Marty Jackson in the television series Prisoner, after Ronald Korosy and Andrew McKaige had played the character in earlier episodes.

He had previously appeared in Sons and Daughters as Todd Fisher. Winchester also appeared in Brides of Christ as Martin Tierney. In 1984 he was in the TV-film The Schippan Mystery, and in 1988 the film The Everlasting Secret Family.

== Filmography ==
=== Film ===
Year	Title	Role	Notes
1984	The Schippan Mystery	August Schippan	Television film
1988	The Everlasting Secret Family	School Teacher	
1989	Minnamurra	Rupert Richards	
2011	New Profession	Jon	Short film
2012	Bathing Franky	Raven	

=== Television ===
Year	Title	Role	Notes
1980	Cop Shop	Singing Telegram Man	Episode: "Episode #1.204"
1983	A Country Practice	Clyde, Billy Tyler	4 episodes
1984	Sons and Daughters	Todd Fisher	19 episodes
1984	Bodyline	McCabe	Episode: "Episode #1.1"
1986	A Fortunate Life	Brindley	Episode: "Providence (1914-1916)"
1986	Prisoner	Marty Jackson	59 episodes
1991	Brides of Christ	Martin Tierney	Episode: "Paul"
