= Faces of Change =

Australian documentary series (1982-83)

Faces of Change was an Australian documentary series created by Anne Deveson and broadcast by the ABC in 1982 to 83. It was a six part series about ordinary women. Subjects covered were an Aboriginal woman who was separated from her family as an infant, a woman doctor running a woman's health centre, the effect on working women of insufficient child care, a lesbian couple, a young street-wise punk and a woman fighting for rights for women in heavy industry.
