= Lewis Fitz-Gerald =

Australian actor, screenwriter and television director

- Born: 15 November 1958 (age 67); Adelaide, South Australia, Australia
- Education: National Institute of Dramatic Art (1978); University of New England (2009; 2016)
- Occupations: Actor; writer; director; academic
- Years active: 1976–present
- Website: Lewis Fitz-Gerald

Lewis Fitz-Gerald (born 15 November 1958) is an Australian actor, screenwriter and television director.

== Early life and education ==
Fitz-Gerald studied acting at National Institute of Dramatic Art (NIDA), graduating in 1978 with a Bachelor of Dramatic Art.

He furthered his education in 2009, when he obtained a Master of Arts (Comms), and again in 2016, when he completed a Doctorate of Philosophy, both at University of New England (UNE).

== Career ==
Fitz-Gerald had an early recurring guest role in Skyways from 1979–1980, playing Leslie Foy. Guest roles in The Sullivans, Cop Shop and Young Ramsay followed, before scoring his first film role in Bruce Beresford's 1980 biographical war drama Breaker Morant, opposite Bryan Brown and Jack Thompson, in which he played Lt. George Witton, a junior officer, who'd quickly become disillusioned.

He appeared in several miniseries' including The Last Outlaw (1980), Outbreak of Love and I Can Jump Puddles (both 1981), followed by the 1982 drama film We of the Never Never (based on the 1908 autobiographical novel of the same name) alongside John Jarratt and Angela Punch McGregor. Other film credits of the 1980s included Fighting Back (1982), The Boy Who Had Everything (1985), The More Things Change (1986) and Warm Nights on a Slow Moving Train (1987), as well as TV films The Dean Case (1983), Time's Raging (1985), Ivanhoe (1986) and Police State (1989).

Fitz-Gerald secured a 26-episode role as pilot David Gibson in medical drama series The Flying Doctors in 1986. It was his first long-running series and he admitted to thinking "long and hard" before signing up. To aid his portrayal of David, Fitz-Gerald spent time with real-life pilots to learn about flying. He also starred as Tony in the acclaimed 1987 TV movie The Shiralee, opposite Bryan Brown.

In 1988, he appeared alongside Meryl Streep and Sam Neill in the Fred Schepisi biopic Evil Angels (aka A Cry in the Dark), which portrayed the true story of the disappearance of Azaria Chamberlain and the ensuing legal case and media storm. The same year, he starred in Rikky and Pete. Television guest credits in the late 1980s included western drama series Five Mile Creek, the American Mission: Impossible reboot (filmed in Australia), and the sports miniseries The Four Minute Mile.

The 1990s brought further guest roles in series' including EARTH Force, A Country Practice, G.P., Time Trax, The Damnation of Harvey McHugh, Snowy River: The Mcgregor Saga, Cody: Bad Love, Big Sky, Murder Call, Wildside, Good Guys, Bad Guys, Stingers.

Fitz-Gerald earned an AFI Award nomination for his 1993 directorial docudrama film The Last Man Hanged, in which he also starred as journalist, Keith Willey, who followed the events leading up to the hanging of Ronald Ryan in Pentridge Prison in 1967.

He played the recurring role of Dr. Sebert Blitho in medical drama series RFDS from 1993 to 1994, and had a part in 1994 buddy movie Spider and Rose opposite Ruth Cracknell. He next portrayed Les in 1996 mystery thriller film Dead Heart, and the same year, appeared in anthology series, Twisted Tales.

At the turn of the century, Fitz-Gerald starred in the Hollywood sci-fi film Pitch Black alongside Vin Diesel and Radha Mitchell. Television guest roles of the era included Ponderosa, Farscape, Out There and Blue Heelers and appearances in miniseries' and TV movies included The Three Stooges (2000), Border Patrol (2001), The Mystery of Natalie Wood (2004) and Dynasty: The Making of a Guilty Pleasure (2005). In 2009, he appeared in drama film The Boys are Back, alongside British actor Clive Owen, the TV movie A Model Daughter: The Killing of Caroline Byrne and crime series Underbelly: A Tale of Two Cities. The following year he scored a recurring guest role as Snr Detective Gordon Eaves in long-running soap opera Home and Away.

In 2011, Fitz-Gerald had a lead role in ABC legal drama series Crownies, as David Sinclair, King's boss and the director of public prosecutions. That same year, he appeared as racehorse owner Sir Michael Smurfit in The Cup, the true story of the 2002 Melbourne Cup, which he followed with romantic comedy Not Suitable for Children (2012) opposite Ryan Kwanten and Hollywood superhero blockbuster The Wolverine (2013) starring Hugh Jackman.

Fitz-Gerald played Alan Reid in 2013 political drama miniseries Power Games: The Packer–Murdoch War and resumed his role as David Sinclair in Crownies spin-off, Janet King. In 2016, he had an ongoing part in US drama series Hunters, as Truss Jackson.

Later guest roles have been in Miss Fisher's Murder Mysteries, Winter, Rake, Blue Murder: Killer Cop, Reef Break and The Wilds, while more recent film credits include Dance Academy: The Movie (2017) and Harmony (2018). In 2018, Fitz-Gerald was also named for six-part ABC / Netflix political thriller series Pine Gap, in which he played Rudi Fox, the Chief of Intelligence at Pine Gap, a Defence Facility in remote Central Australia.

Fitz-Gerald appeared in both seasons of psychological thriller series The Secrets She Keeps, beginning in 2020. In 2022, he played the recurring role of Henry in political comedy series The PM's Daughter. His most recent television role has been as Richard Rankin in NCIS: Sydney from 2023 to 2025.

Fitz-Gerald helped found Belvoir St Theatre Company and has also acted extensively for the stage, since the 1970s. He has lectured in Screen and Media Studies at Australia's University of New England School of the Arts since 2017.

== Awards ==
Year	Work	Award	Category	Result
1980	Breaker Morant	Australian Film Institute Awards	Best Supporting Actor	Nominated
1981	I Can Jump Puddles	Australian Film Institute Awards	Best Actor	Nominated
1993	The Last Man Hanged	Australian Film Institute Awards	Best Documentary	Nominated
1994	Race Against Prime Time	Australian Teachers of Media	Best Educational Documentary	Won
2012	Crownies	Equity Ensemble Awards	Outstanding Performance by an Ensemble in a Drama Series	Nominated

== Filmography ==
=== Television (as actor) ===
Year	Title	Role	Notes	Ref
1979–1980	Skyways	Leslie Foy	6 episodes	
1980	Young Ramsay	Maurice Morpeth	1 episode	
1980	Cop Shop	Daryn	2 episodes	
1980	The Sullivans	Dirk	2 episodes	
1980	The Last Outlaw	Tom Lloyd	Miniseries, 4 episodes	
1981	Outbreak of Love	Captain John Wickham	Miniseries	
1981	I Can Jump Puddles	Alan Marshall / Narrator	Miniseries, 9 episodes	
1983	The Dean Case	George Dean	TV movie	
1984	Five Mile Creek	Nigel	1 episode	
1985	Time's Raging	David	TV movie	
1986	Ivanhoe	Ivanhoe	Animated TV movie	
1986	The Flying Doctors	David 'Gibbo' Gibson	24 episodes	
1987	The Shiralee	Tony	Miniseries, 2 episodes	
1988	The Four Minute Mile	Denis Johansson	Miniseries	
1989	Mission: Impossible	Matthew Rhine	1 episode	
1989	Police State	Gary Crooke	TV movie	
1990	EARTH Force	Halloran	1 episode	
1991	A Country Practice	Tony Harvey	2 episodes	
1993	Time Trax	Charlie Burke	2 episodes	
1993	G.P.	Geoff Hardy	2 episodes	
1993–1994	RFDS	Dr. Sebert Blitho	13 episodes	
1994	The Damnation of Harvey McHugh	Trevor Martin	1 episode	
1994	Cody: Bad Love	Martin Campbell	TV movie	
1996	Snowy River: The Mcgregor Saga	Henry Faulkner	1 episode	
1996	Naked: Stories of Men	Stanky	Anthology series, episode: "Coral Island"	
1997	Big Sky	Tom	1 episode	
1997	The Adventures of Sam	Billy Branscombe	Animated series, 2 episodes	
1998	Good Guys, Bad Guys	Marshall Dobbs	1 episode	
1998	Wildside	Bryant	2 episodes	
1998	Murder Call	Lionel McKenzie	1 episode	
1999	Stingers	Det. Snr. Sgt. Vic Slater	1 episode	
2000	The Three Stooges	Jules White	TV movie	
2001	Ponderosa	Henry Stewart	1 episode	
2001	Border Patrol	Roderick Helms	TV movie	
2002	Farscape	Kor Toska	1 episode	
2004	The Mystery of Natalie Wood	Dr Thayer	Miniseries	
2004	Blue Heelers	Jim Morgan	1 episode	
2004	Out There		1 episode	
2005	Dynasty: The Making of a Guilty Pleasure	Winston Fletcher	TV movie	
2009	Underbelly: A Tale of Two Cities	John Aston	3 episodes	
2009	A Model Daughter: The Killing of Caroline Byrne	Gary Jubelin	TV movie	
2010	Home and Away	Snr. Det. Gordon Eaves	4 episodes	
2011	Crownies	David Sinclair QC	22 episodes	
2013	Power Games: The Packer–Murdoch War	Alan Reid	Miniseries, 2 episodes	
2013	Miss Fisher's Murder Mysteries	Professor Bradbury	1 episode	
2014	Janet King	David Sinclair QC	4 episodes	
2015	Winter	Bjorn Johannson	2 episodes	
2016	Rake	Mandel	1 episode	
2016	Hunters	Truss Jackson	13 episodes	
2017	Blue Murder: Killer Cop	Commissioner	Miniseries, 1 episode	
2018	Pine Gap	Rudi Fox	6 episodes	
2019	Reef Break	Sonny Turner/ Bob Clark	2 episodes	
2020	The Wilds	Ted Wolchak	1 episode	
2020; 2022	The Secrets She Keeps	Reg	9 episodes	
2022	The PM's Daughter	Henry	10 episodes	
2023	Queen of Oz	Peter Walsh	1 episode	
2023; 2025	NCIS: Sydney	Colonel Richard Rankin	6 episodes	

=== Film (as actor) ===
Year	Title	Role	Notes	Ref
1980	Breaker Morant	George		
1982	We of the Never Never	Jack		
1982	Fighting Back	John Embling		
1985	The Boy Who Had Everything	Vandervelt		
1986	The More Things Change	Barry		
1987	Warm Nights on a Slow Moving Train	Brian		
1988	Rikky and Pete	Adam		
1988	A Cry in the Dark (aka Evil Angels)	Tipple		
1989	Life in the Balance		Short film	
1993	The Last Man Hanged	Keith Willey		
1994	Spider and Rose	Robert Dougherty		
1994	Change	PT	Short film	
1996	Dead Heart	Les / Teacher		
1998	War Story	Father	Short film	
2000	Pitch Black	Paris P. Ogilvie		
2006	Loveproof		Short film	
2009	The Boys are Back	Tim Walker		
2011	Lachlan Macquarie: The Father of Australia	Commissioner Bigge		
2011	The Cup	Sir Michael Smurfit		
2011	Phone Call	Stanley	Short film	
2012	Not Suitable For Children	Dr McKenzie		
2013	The Wolverine	Attorney #1		
2015	Truth	Louis Boccardi		
2017	Dance Academy: The Movie	ICU Dr Kelly		
2018	Pimped	Michael Hanson		
2018	Harmony	Mr Lenox		
2022	Thirteen Lives	Vern Unsworth		
2023	What About Sal	Geoff		
2025	Spit	Ian Hamblin KC		

=== Writer / director ===
Year	Title	Role	Notes	Ref
1993	The Last Man Hanged	Writer / director	TV docudrama film	
1994	The Gadfly	Writer / director	TV documentary film	
1995	Race Against Prime Time	Director	Documentary	
1997	Big Sky	Storyliner		
1998	Twisted Tales	Director	1 episode	
1999–2000	Stingers	Director	4 episodes	
2000	Aria and Pasta	Director	Documentary series, 7 episodes	
2001	Water Rats	Director / Second Unit Director	2 episodes / 5 episodes	
2001–2002	Ponderosa	Director	4 episodes	
2002	McLeod's Daughters	Director	2 episodes	
2003	Sex and Drugs and Rock’N’Roll	Writer		
2003–2006	Home and Away	Director	59 episodes	
2008	Neighbours	Director	5 episodes	
2008	Out of the Blue	Director	15 episodes	
2016	39,000 Doors Create	Writer / Director / Producer	Feature documentary	

== Theatre ==
Year	Title	Role	Notes
1976	Carlotta and Maximillian	Napoleon	Adelaide Festival
1979	Jumpers		Nimrod Theatre Company
1982	The Maid's Tragedy	Lead	MTC
1982	Death of a Salesman	Howard	Seymour Centre, Sydney with Nimrod Theatre Company
1984	The Blind Giant is Dancing	Bruce Fitzgerald	Sydney Theatre Company
1985	The Margarine Conspiracy	Tom	Sydney Theatre Company
1985	Doctor in Spite of Himself	Rex Leandro	Sydney Theatre Company
1985	Playing with Fire	The Son	Sydney Theatre Company
1985	The Bourgeois Wedding	Groom	Sydney Theatre Company
1985	Perfect Mismatch	Stuart	Sydney Theatre Company
1985	Torquato Tasso	Antonio	Sydney Theatre Company
1988	Dreams in an Empty City	Chris	West End, London
1990	Top Silk	Tony Turner	Adelaide & Canberra tour with Kinselas Productions
1991	Master Builder	Ragnar Brovik	Belvoir Street Theatre, Sydney
1993	The Perfectionist	Stuart	Marian St Theatre, Sydney
1997	Black Mary	Captain King	Company B, Sydney
2023	Wild Thing	Geoff / Various characters	Arts on Tour

== See also ==
- List of University of New England (Australia) people
