= The Simon Gallaher Show =

The Simon Gallaher Show was an Australian television variety series which aired from 1982 to 1983 on the ABC. It starred singer and pianist Simon Gallaher and was produced by Ted Emery and Michael Shrimpton.
