= 1983 Australian Film Institute Awards =

Australian film awards ceremony in 1983

25th Australian Film Institute Awards
- Date: 24 September 1983
- Site: Sydney Entertainment Centre, New South Wales

Highlights
- Best Film: Careful, He Might Hear You
- Most awards: Careful, He Might Hear You (8)
- Most nominations: Careful, He Might Hear You (13)

Television coverage
- Network: ABC TV

The 25th Australian Film Institute Awards (generally known as the AFI Awards) were held at the Sydney Entertainment Centre on 24 September 1983. Presented by the Australian Film Institute (AFI), the awards celebrated the best in Australian feature film, documentary and short film productions of 1983.

Twenty feature films were entered. Careful, He Might Hear You received eight awards including Best Film. Phar Lap received three awards. Film technician Bill Gooley received the Raymond Longford Award for lifetime achievement.

== Winners and nominees ==
Winners are listed first and highlighted in boldface.

=== Feature film ===
Best Film	Best Achievement in Direction
**Careful, He Might Hear You – Jill Robb**; Man of Flowers – Jane Ballantyne; Phar Lap – John Sexton; The Year of Living Dangerously – Jim McElroy	**Carl Schultz – Careful, He Might Hear You**; Paul Cox – Man of Flowers; Simon Wincer – Phar Lap; Peter Weir – The Year of Living Dangerously
Best Performance by an Actor in a Leading Role	Best Performance by an Actress in a Leading Role
**Norman Kaye – Man of Flowers**; Nicholas Gledhill – Careful, He Might Hear You; Martin Vaughan – Phar Lap; Mel Gibson – The Year of Living Dangerously	**Wendy Hughes – Careful, He Might Hear You**; Kris McQuade – Buddies; Lorna Lesley – The Settlement; Genevieve Picot – Undercover
Best Performance by an Actor in a Supporting Role	Best Performance by an Actress in a Supporting Role
**John Hargreaves – Careful, He Might Hear You**; Simon Chilvers – Buddies; John Meillon – The Wild Duck; Martin Vaughan – The Winds of Jarrah	**Linda Hunt – The Year of Living Dangerously**; Robyn Nevin – Careful, He Might Hear You; Pat Evison – The Clinic; Sandy Gore – Undercover
Best Original Screenplay	Best Screenplay Adapted from Another Source
**John Dingwall – Buddies**; Paul Cox, Bob Ellis – Man of Flowers; David Williamson – Phar Lap; Greg Millin – The Clinic	**Michael Jenkins – Careful, He Might Hear You**; Richard Cassidy – Now and Forever; Tutte Lemkow, Dido Merwin, Henri Safran, Peter Smalley – The Wild Duck; Christopher Koch, Peter Weir, David Williamson – The Year of Living Dangerously
Best Achievement in Cinematography	Best Achievement in Editing
**John Seale – Careful, He Might Hear You**; Yuri Sokol – Man of Flowers; Russell Boyd – The Year of Living Dangerously; Dean Semler – Undercover	**Tony Paterson – Phar Lap**; Richard Francis-Bruce – Careful, He Might Hear You; William Anderson – The Year of Living Dangerously; Tim Wellburn – Undercover
Best Achievement in Sound	Best Original Music Score
**Peter Burgess, Peter Fenton, Phil Heywood, Ron Purvis, Terry Rodman, Gary Wilkins – Phar Lap**; Peter Barker, Julian Ellingworth, Marc van Buuren – Buddies; Syd Butterworth, Julian Ellingworth, Roger Savage, Andrew Steuart – Careful, He Might Hear You; Jeanine Chialvo, Peter Fenton, Lee Smith, Andrew Steuart – The Year of Living Dangerously	**Bruce Rowland – Phar Lap**; Chris Neal – Buddies; Ray Cook – Careful, He Might Hear You; Maurice Jarre – The Year of Living Dangerously
Best Achievement in Production Design	Best Achievement in Costume Design
**John Stoddart – Careful, He Might Hear You**; Darrell Lass – The Wild Duck; Wendy Weir, Herbert Pinter – The Year of Living Dangerously; Herbert Pinter – Undercover	**Bruce Finlayson – Careful, He Might Hear You**; Anna Senior – Phar Lap; Terry Ryan – The Year of Living Dangerously; Kristian Fredrikson – Undercover

=== Non-feature film ===
Best Documentary Film	Best Sponsored Documentary
**First Contact – Robin Anderson, Bob Connolly (producer)**; Birdmen Of Kilimanjaro – Anne Folland (producer); Double Concerto – Angela Catterns (producer); Peppimenarti – Ron Iddon (producer)	**Street Kids – Kent Chadwick (producer)**; Ageing In The New Age – Suzanne Baker (producer); Homefront – Australian Film and Television School (production company), Julie Money (director); Tandberg On Page One – Ivan Gaal (producer)
Best Short Fiction Film	Best Animated Film
**A Town Like This – John Prescott (producer)**; Genius In Lying – Swinburne Film and Television School (production company), Anne Harding (director); On Guard – Digby Duncan (producer); PEEL – Australian Film and Television School (production company), Jane Campion (director)	**Dance Of Death – Dennis Tupicoff (producer)**; Foxbat And The Demon – John Skibinski (producer)
Best Experimental Film	Best Achievement in Direction
**Serious Undertakings – Erika Addis (producer)**; The Lion in the Doorway – Christina Ferguson (producer); This Woman Is Not A Car – Margaret Dodd, Saran Bennett (producer); Traces – Paul Winkler (producer)	**Esben Storm – With Prejudice**; Helen Grace – Serious Undertakings; Anne Harding – Genius In Lying; Hugh Piper – Double Concerto
Best Screenplay	Best Achievement in Cinematography
**Wendy Thompson – Marbles**; Joan Bean, Richard Dennison – A Voice in the Wilderness; Helen Grace – Serious Undertakings; David Muir – The Rough and the Smooth	**Paul Elliott – The Lion in the Doorway**; Brian Probyn – 18 Foot People; Michael Dillon, Paul Tait – Birdmen Of Kilimanjaro; Andrew Lesnie – Stations
Best Achievement in Editing	Best Achievement in Sound
**Suresh Ayyar – Double Concerto**; Martyn Down, Stewart Young – First Contact; Jane Campion – PEEL; Roger Scholes – The Sealer	**Max Hensser – Birdmen Of Kilimanjaro**; David Hughes – A Zoo in the Trees; Pat Fiske – On Guard; Peter Hammond – The Lion in the Doorway

=== Additional awards ===
Jury Prize
- **Peter Weir, Linda Hunt – The Year of Living Dangerously**
Raymond Longford Award
- **Bill Gooley**
