= Debra Byrne discography =

- Studio albums: 5
- Soundtrack albums: 1
- Singles: 11

The discography of Australian contemporary R&B, pop music and stage and screen recording artist Debra Byrne consists of five studio albums, one soundtrack album and eleven singles.

== Studio albums ==
List of albums, with selected chart positions and certifications
Title	Album details	Peak chart positions	Certifications
Title	Album details	AUS	Certifications
She's a Rebel	Released: November 1974; Format: LP; Label: L&Y Records (L 35362)	63	
The Persuader	Released: 1985; Format: LP, cassette; Label: EMI Music (EMX 430032)	-	
Caught in the Act	Released: April 1991; Format: LP, Cassette, CD; Label: Mushroom Records (53342)	2	AUS: Gold
Sleeping Child	Released: March 1994; Format: CD; Label: Mushroom Records (D31053)	81	
New Ways to Dream	Released: May 1997; Format: CD, Cassette; Label: Polydor Records	41	
"—" denotes releases that did not chart, or have no reliable sources of charting information.

== Soundtrack albums ==
List of Soundtracks, with selected chart positions and certifications
Title	Album details	Peak chart positions
Title	Album details	AUS
Rebel: Original Motion Picture Soundtrack (with Matt Dillon)	Released: December 1985; Format: LP, Cassette; Label: EMI Music (240439)	75

== Singles ==
List of singles, with selected chart positions
Year	Title	Peak chart positions	Album
Year	Title	AUS	Album
1974	He's a Rebel / I Am Woman	25	She’s a Rebel
1974	Boogie Man / Da Doo Ron Ron	29	She’s a Rebel
1975	How Can I Tell You / Byrning	75	She’s a Rebel
1975	Tell Sonny Not to Come / If You Say It's So	—	single only
1976	Dirty Ol' Man / Ain't no Sunshine	—	She’s a Rebel
1976	You Promised Me the Love / There'll Never be a Way	63	single only
1981	Tears / Something to Remember	—	single only
1985	Memory (from 'Cats')	—	Cats Original Australian Cast Recording
1985	The Persuader / So Sad the Song	—	The Persuader
1985	Heroes / Memory	37	Rebel: Original Motion Picture Soundtrack / The Persuader
1989	Nature's Lament (credited to Debbie Byrne and Company)	52	single only
1994	Diamond in the Rough / Say Goodbye to the Broken Hearted	—	Sleeping Child
1994	In my Heart / Stay Just a Little	—	Sleeping Child
1995	Heaven Down Here / Send A Little Light / Close Your Eyes / Softly & Tenderly / Hard Times	—	Heaven Down Here EP
1996	As If We Never Said Goodbye	—	promotional single 'Sunset Boulevarde' Australian Cast Recording

== Cast Recordings ==
List cast recordings
Year	Album	Character
1985	Cats (original Australian cast)	Grizabella
1988	Les Misérables: The Complete Symphonic Recording	Fantine
2010	Mary Poppins (original Australian cast)	The Bird Woman

== Other appearances ==
List of other non-single song appearances
Title	Year	Album
"I Could Be Happy With You"	1972	We've Only Just Begun (Ronnie Burns album)
"It's Too Late"	1973	Young Talent Time
"I Don't Know How to Love Him"	1973	Young Talent Time
"You Need a Friend"	1973	Young Talent Time - Volume 2
"He's a Rebel"	1981	Young Talent Time 10th Anniversary Album
"Da Doo Ron Ron"	1981	Young Talent Time 10th Anniversary Album
"He's a Rebel"	1985	Young Talent Time - Now and Then 15th Anniversary Album
"Memory"	1993	Great Moments in Australian Theatre
"I Dreamed a Dream"	1993	Great Moments in Australian Theatre
"You’ve Always Got the Blues"	1994	Kate Ceberano and Friends
"Mary's Little Boy"	1996	The Best of Carols by Candlelight
"Angels We Have Heard on High"	1997	The Best of Carols by Candlelight – Volume 2

== See also ==
- Young Talent Time
