= AACTA Award for Best Original Music Score =

Australian film award

The Australian Film Institute Award for Best Original Music Score, formerly AFI Award for Best Original Music Score, is an award in the annual Australian Film Institute Awards.

== Winners and nominees ==
Year	Film	Composer(s)
1970s
1975	The Cars That Ate Paris / The Great Macarthy	Bruce Smeaton
1977	The Picture Show Man	Peter Best
1977	Mad Dog Morgan	Patrick Flynn
1977	Oz	Ross Wilson
1977	Storm Boy	Michael Carlos
1978	The Chant of Jimmie Blacksmith	Bruce Smeaton
1978	The Last Wave	Charles Wain
1978	The Mango Tree	Marc Wilkinson
1978	Newsfront	William Motzing
1979	Mad Max	Brian May
1979	In Search of Anna	John Martyn
1979	The Last of the Knucklemen	Bruce Smeaton
1979	The Night the Prowler	Cameron Allan
1980s
1980	Manganinnie	Peter Sculthorpe
1980	The Chain Reaction	Andrew Thomas Wilson
1980	...Maybe This Time	Bruce Smeaton
1980	Stir	Cameron Allan
1981	Fatty Finn	Grahame Bond and Rory O'Donoghue
1981	Grendel Grendel Grendel	Bruce Smeaton
1981	Roadgames	Brian May
1981	Wrong Side of the Road	Jordy Butler
1982	The Man from Snowy River	Bruce Rowland
1982	Mad Max 2	Brian May
1982	Starstruck	Dennis James, Phil Judd, Bill Miller and Mark Moffatt
1982	We of the Never Never	Peter Best
1983	Phar Lap	Bruce Rowland
1983	Buddies	Chris Neal
1983	Careful, He Might Hear You	Ray Cook
1983	The Year of Living Dangerously	Maurice Jarre
1984	Street Hero	Garth Porter and Bruce Rowland
1984	Annie's Coming Out	Simon Walker
1984	Razorback	Iva Davies
1984	Silver City	William Motzing
1985	Rebel	Peter Best, Billy Byers, Ray Cook, Chris Neal and Bruce Rowland
1985	Bliss	Peter Best
1985	The Coca-Cola Kid	Tim Finn and William Motzing
1985	Frog Dreaming	Brian May
1986	Young Einstein	Martin Armiger and William Motzing
1986	Burke & Wills	Peter Sculthorpe
1986	For Love Alone	Nathan Waks
1986	The More Things Change...	Peter Best
1987	The Tale of Ruby Rose	Paul Schutze
1987	Echoes of Paradise	William Motzing
1987	Those Dear Departed	Phillip Scott
1987	The Umbrella Woman	Cameron Allan
1988	The Lighthorsemen	Mario Millo
1988	Daisy and Simon	Andrew Hagen and Morton Wilson
1988	Fever	Frank Strangio
1988	Incident at Raven's Gate	Roman Kronen and Graham Tardif
1989	Dead Calm	Graeme Revell
1989	Evil Angels	Bruce Smeaton
1989	Georgia	Paul Grabowsky
1989	Ghosts... of the Civil Dead	Blixa Bargeld, Nick Cave and Mick Harvey
1990s
1990	The Big Steal	Phil Judd
1990	Sher Mountain Killings Mystery	Art Phillips
1990	Struck by Lightning	Paul Smyth
1990	Wendy Cracked a Walnut	Bruce Smeaton
1991	Dingo	Miles Davis and Michel Legrand
1991	Aya	Roger Mason
1991	Stan and George's New Life	Michael Atkinson
1991	A Woman's Tale	Paul Grabowsky
1992	Romper Stomper	John Clifford White
1992	Black Robe	Georges Delerue
1992	The Last Days of Chez Nous	Paul Grabowsky
1992	Redheads	Felicity Foxx
1993	The Piano	Michael Nyman
1993	Flynn	Billy Childs and Anthony Marinelli
1993	Map of the Human Heart	Gabriel Yared
1993	On My Own	Franco Piersanti
1994	Traps	Stephen Rae
1994	The Adventures of Priscilla, Queen of the Desert	Guy Gross
1994	Exile	Paul Grabowsky
1994	Sirens	Rachel Portman
1995	Dad and Dave: On Our Selection	Peter Best
1995	Hotel Sorrento	Nerida Tyson-Chew
1995	Mushrooms	Paul Grabowsky
1995	Sanctuary	Christopher Gordon
1996	Shine	David Hirschfelder
1996	Children of the Revolution	Nigel Westlake
1996	Dead Heart	Stephen Rae
1996	Lilian's Story	Cezary Skubiszewski
1997	Doing Time for Patsy Cline	Peter Best
1997	Idiot Box	Nick Launay and Tim Rogers
1997	Road to Nhill	Elizabeth Drake
1997	The Well	Stephen Rae
1998	Oscar and Lucinda	Thomas Newman
1998	The Boys	The Necks
1998	Head On	Ollie Olsen
1998	The Interview	David Hirschfelder
1999	In a Savage Land	David Bridie
1999	Praise	Dirty Three
1999	Soft Fruit	Antony Partos
1999	Two Hands	Cezary Skubiszewski
2000s
2000	Bootmen	Cezary Skubiszewski
2000	15 Amore	Carlo Giacco
2000	Better Than Sex	David Hirschfelder
2000	Chopper	Mick Harvey
2001	La Spagnola	Cezary Skubiszewski
2001	The Bank	Alan John
2001	The Dish	Edmund Choi
2001	Lantana	Paul Kelly
2002	Rabbit-Proof Fence	Peter Gabriel
2002	Australian Rules	Mick Harvey
2002	Beneath Clouds	Ivan Sen and Alister Spence
2002	Walking on Water	Antony Partos
2003	Japanese Story	Elizabeth Drake
2003	Alexandra's Project	Graham Tardif
2003	Gettin' Square	3KShort
2003	Travelling Light	Richard Vella
2004	Somersault	Decoder Ring
2004	The Old Man Who Read Love Stories	Graham Tardif
2004	One Perfect Day	David Hobson
2004	Thunderstruck	Frank Tetaz and David Thrussell
2005	The Proposition	Nick Cave and Warren Ellis
2005	Little Fish	Nathan Larson
2005	Three Dollars	Alan John
2005	Wolf Creek	Frank Tetaz
2006	Suburban Mayhem	Mick Harvey
2006	The Book of Revelation	Cezary Skubiszewski
2006	Jindabyne	Paul Kelly and Dan Luscombe
2006	Macbeth	John Clifford White
2007	The Home Song Stories	Antony Partos
2007	Noise	Bryony Marks
2007	Razzle Dazzle	Roger Mason
2007	Romulus, My Father	Basil Hogios
2008	Unfinished Sky	Antony Partos
2008	The Black Balloon	Michael Yezerski
2008	The Square	Ben Lee and Frank Tetaz
2008	The Tender Hook	Chris Abrahams
2009	Mao's Last Dancer	Christopher Gordon
2009	Australia	David Hirschfelder
2009	Balibo	Lisa Gerrard
2009	Samson and Delilah	Warwick Thornton
2010s
2010	Animal Kingdom	Antony Partos
2010	Beneath Hill 60	Cezary Skubiszewski
2010	Bran Nue Dae	Cezary Skubiszewski
2010	Bright Star	Mark Bradshaw
AACTA Awards
2011 (1st)	The Hunter	Andrew Lancaster, Michael Lira and Matteo Zingales
2011 (1st)	Legend of the Guardians: The Owls of Ga'Hoole	David Hirschfelder
2011 (1st)	Red Dog	Cezary Skubiszewski
2011 (1st)	Snowtown	Jed Kurzel
2012 (2nd)	Not Suitable for Children	Jono Ma and Matteo Zingales
2012 (2nd)	33 Postcards	Antony Partos
2012 (2nd)	A Few Best Men	Guy Gross
2012 (2nd)	Mental	Michael Yezerski
2013 (3rd)	The Great Gatsby	Craig Armstrong
2013 (3rd)	Dead Europe	Jed Kurzel
2013 (3rd)	Drift	Michael Yezerski
2013 (3rd)	The Rocket	Caitlin Yeo
2014 (4th)	The Railway Man	David Hirschfelder
2014 (4th)	Healing	David Hirschfelder
2014 (4th)	Predestination	Peter Spierig
2014 (4th)	The Rover	Antony Partos and Sam Petty
2015 (5th)	Mad Max: Fury Road	Junkie XL
2015 (5th)	The Dressmaker	David Hirschfelder
2015 (5th)	Paper Planes	Nigel Westlake
2015 (5th)	Partisan	Oneohtrix Point Never
2016 (6th)	Tanna	Antony Partos
2016 (6th)	Boys in the Trees	Darrin Verhagen
2016 (6th)	Gods of Egypt	Marco Beltrami
2016 (6th)	Teenage Kicks	David Barber
2017 (7th)	Lion	Volker Bertelmann and Dustin O’Halloran
2017 (7th)	Ali's Wedding	Nigel Westlake & Sydney Symphony Orchestra
2017 (7th)	Berlin Syndrome	Bryony Marks
2017 (7th)	The Butterfly Tree	Caitlin Yeo
2018 (8th)	Ladies in Black	Christopher Gordon
2018 (8th)	Mary Magdalene	Hildur Guðnadóttir and Jóhann Jóhannsson
2018 (8th)	Peter Rabbit	Dominic Lewis
2018 (8th)	Upgrade	Jed Palmer
2019 (9th)	Judy and Punch	François Tétaz
2019 (9th)	Danger Close: The Battle of Long Tan	Caitlin Yeo
2019 (9th)	Hotel Mumbai	Volker Bertelmann
2019 (9th)	Ride Like a Girl	David Hirschfelder
2020s
2020 (10th)	Babyteeth	Amanda Brown
2020 (10th)	Dirt Music	Craig Armstrong
2020 (10th)	H is for Happiness	Nerida Tyson-Chew
2020 (10th)	I Am Woman	Rafael May
2020 (10th)	True History of the Kelly Gang	Jed Kurzel
2021 (11th)	June Again	Christopher Gordon
2021 (11th)	The Dry	Peter Raeburn
2021 (11th)	Nitram	Jed Kurzel
2021 (11th)	Penguin Bloom	Marcelo Zarvos
2021 (11th)	Rams	Antony Partos
2022 (12th)	Falling for Figaro	Cezary Skubiszewski
2022 (12th)	The Drover's Wife	Salliana Seven Campbell
2022 (12th)	Elvis	Elliott Wheeler
2022 (12th)	A Stitch in Time	Angela Little
2022 (12th)	Three Thousand Years of Longing	Tom Holkenborg
2023 (13th)	Talk to Me	Cornel Wilczek
2023 (13th)	The Big Dog	Sam Weiss
2023 (13th)	Blueback	Nigel Westlake
2023 (13th)	Godless: The Eastfield Exorcism	Dmitri Golovko
2023 (13th)	Suka	Me-Lee Hay
2024 (14th)	Better Man	Batu Sener
2024 (14th)	Furiosa: A Mad Max Saga	Tom Holkenborg
2024 (14th)	How to Make Gravy	Sam Dixon
2024 (14th)	Late Night with the Devil	Roscoe James Irwin and Glenn Richards
2024 (14th)	Memoir of a Snail	Elena Kats-Chernin

== See also ==
- List of film music awards § Best score
