= Persuader =

Persuader may refer to:

- Persuader (band), a Swedish power metal band
- Persuader (comics), three DC Comics supervillains
- Persuader (novel), a 2003 thriller novel
- Persuader (Reacher), a 2025 TV episode
- Persuader, another name for a priest (tool)
- Persuader rule, a defunct U.S. requirement for law firms to disclose their provision of anti-union legal advice
- The Persuader (album), a 1985 album by Debbie Byrne
- The Persuader (film), a 1957 American Western film
- Mossberg 500 (Mossberg Persuader), a line of shotguns produced by O.F. Mossberg & Sons

== See also ==
- The Persuaders (disambiguation)
- Persuasion (disambiguation)
  - Persuasion
  - Modes of persuasion
- Influencer
