= Clytie (disambiguation) =

Clytie is the name of various figures in Greek mythology.

Clytie may also refer to:

- Clytie Hine (1887–1983), Australian-born operatic soprano and voice teacher
- Clytie Jessop (1929–2017), British-based Australian actress, gallerist, painter, screenwriter and film director
- Clytie (moth), a moth genus
- USS Clytie, a World War II US Navy submarine tender
