= Rebel (soundtrack) =

Rebel: Original Motion Picture Soundtrack

Soundtrack album by Matt Dillon and Debbie Byrne
- Released: December 1985
- Recorded: 1985
- Studio: Studios 301, Sydney Australia
- Length: 36:24
- Label: EMI Music
- Producer: Bruce Rowland

Debbie Byrne albums chronology
The Persuader (1985)	Rebel: Original Motion Picture Soundtrack (1985)	Caught in the Act (1992)

Rebel: Original Motion Picture Soundtrack is a soundtrack to the 1985 Australian film of the same name which is based on the play No Names, No Packdrill by Bob Herbert.

The album is credited to Matt Dillon and Debbie Byrne and features the vocals of Byrne, Shauna Jensen, Kim Deacon and Galapagos Duck.

Rebel: Original Motion Picture Soundtrack peaked at number 75 on the Australian Kent Music Report.

At the 1985 AFI Awards, the film was nominated for 9 awards, winning 5 including Best Original Music Award and Best Sound Award.

== Track listing ==
Side A
No.	Title	Writer(s)	Length
1.	"Uncle Sam" (by Debbie Byrne, Shauna Jensen, Kim Deacon)	Peter Best	3:38
2.	"We'll Live The Rest Of Our Lives Tonight" (by Debbie Byrne, Shauna Jensen, Kim Deacon)	Best	2:10
3.	"Air-Raid" (by Debbie Byrne, Shauna Jensen, Kim Deacon)	Best	3:42
4.	"Please Don't Ask Me" (by Debbie Byrne)	Graham Goble	3:48
5.	"Don't Sweetheart Me" (by Debbie Byrne, Shauna Jensen, Kim Deacon)	Charles Tobias; Cliff Friend	2:46

Side B
No.	Title	Writer(s)	Length
1.	"Emu Dance" (by Galapagos Duck)	Tom Hare; John Conley; Greg Foster	4:24
2.	"Lest I Forget" (by Debbie Byrne)	Ray Cook; David Mitchell; Melvyn Morrow	4:16
3.	"Victory Street" (by Debbie Byrne, Shauna Jensen, Kim Deacon)	Best	3:08
4.	"Lethal As Love" (by Debbie Byrne, Shauna Jensen, Kim Deacon)	Best	3:47
5.	"Heroes" (by Debbie Byrne, Shauna Jensen, Kim Deacon)	Best	4:47

== Charts ==
Chart (1986)	Peak position
Australia (Kent Music Report)	75
