= The More Things Change... (film) =

- Directed by: Robyn Nevin
- Written by: Michael Brindley; Moya Wood
- Produced by: Jill Robb
- Starring: Judy Morris; Victoria Longley; Barry Otto
- Release date: 1986
- Country: Australia
- Language: English
- Budget: A$2,320,000
- Box office: A$121,924 (Australia)

The More Things Change... is a 1986 film directed by Robyn Nevin.

== Cast ==
- Judy Morris as Connie
- Victoria Longley as Geraldine
- Barry Otto as Lex
- Lewis Fitz-Gerald as Barry
- Alex Menglet as Telecom Man
- Peter Carroll as Roley

== Plot ==
Connie is a successful publisher in Melbourne and Alex (or "Lex") is her stay-at-home husband, caring for their four-year-old son Nicholas. They have fulfilled his dream of owning a farm: Connie's business is in capable hands, and she claims to enjoy the two-hour commute. Regular farmwork and entertaining Nicholas occupy so much of Alex's time that Connie hires attractive teenager Geraldine as a live-in babysitter. Geraldine has her own problems: she is pregnant and her fiancé was broken off the engagement; she is reluctant to tell her parents – they are still planning for a white wedding.

After the initial enthusiasm, Connie becomes resentful of Alex's situation: he is living the dream at her expense; Alex counters with the fact that she enjoys her air-conditioned career and the attendant social life. She is also jealous of the growing rapport between Alex and Geraldine, but cannot broach the subject. (There had been a tender moment but was broken off by Alex before any compromising contact.) After a heated argument they reconcile and make love. Geraldine's ex-fiancé turns up and re-starts the relationship: he wants to be a responsible father. The baby is born and the white wedding eventuates.

Alex decides to purchase more cattle, but Connie will not commit to the expense. The agent offers an interest-free loan, which Alex accepts, but after the cattle are delivered the agent reneges and demands immediate payment. This is the last straw for Connie, who demands a divorce. She reminds Alex of all his other failed schemes and storms off, taking Nicholas with her.

== Production ==
Jill Robb initiated the project in 1984 and approached Moya Wood to write the script. Robb had worked with Robyn Nevin making Careful He Might Hear You and hired her as a director. Nevin, who had never directed a film before, made sure she was surrounded by an experienced crew.

Money was raised from 70 investors including the New South Wales Film Corporation. Filming started in late April 1985 in Neerim near Warragul in Victoria.
