= Jennifer Flowers =

American ice hockey administrator

- Born: Manson, Iowa, USA
- Education: BEd., 2003, Winona State University; MA, sports management, University of Minnesota
- Employer(s): Northern Sun Intercollegiate Conference; Winona State University; Simpson College; University of Minnesota
- Spouse: Jonte Flowers
- Children: 2

Jennifer Flowers (nee Jepson) is an American ice hockey administrator. In June 2019, Flowers was named the vice-president and women's commissioner of the Western Collegiate Hockey Association (WCHA).

== Early life ==
Flowers was born to parents Mike and Jacque Jepson in Manson, Iowa, and graduated from Manson Northwest Webster High School in 1999. During high school, she earned all state honors in softball, basketball, volleyball and was a member of the shuttle hurdle relay team while maintaining a GPA of 4.00. As such, she was the recipient of the 1999 E. Wayne Cooley Scholarship Award.

Following high school, Flowers was recruited to join Winona State University's (WSU) volleyball team under head coach Amy Fisher. Her freshman season with the team was short due to a season-ending foot injury suffered during an early season game against the Minnesota State University Moorhead. She returned for her sophomore, junior and senior seasons where she earned three consecutive NSIC All-Academic honors. In her final season, Flowers ranked fifth in the NSIC in service aces and seventh in the league in total assists, en route to earning 2002 NSIC All-Conference status.

== Career ==
Following her undergraduate degree, Flowers spent the 2004–05 academic year at the University of Minnesota where she was the assistant to the associate athletic director. While serving in this role, she was the assistant championship manager for four NCAA Championships and one WCHA Championship. She also was the assistant game director for the 2004 Music City Bowl. Flowers eventually left the University of Minnesota to become the associate athletic director and senior woman administrator at WSU and an assistant women’s basketball and volleyball coach at Simpson College. In 2016, she joined the Northern Sun Intercollegiate Conference (NSIC) as an Assistant Commissioner for Membership Services.

In June 2019, Flowers was named the vice-president and women's commissioner of the Western Collegiate Hockey Association (WCHA) despite having never worked in that sport before.

== Personal life ==
Flowers and her husband Jonte Flowers have two children together.
