= Love-Lies-Bleeding (play) =

2005 play by Don DeLillo

Love-Lies-Bleeding is the title of a three-act play by Don DeLillo. It is his third play and had a world-premiere reading May 2, 2005, at Boise Contemporary Theater in Boise, Idaho, directed by DeLillo himself. Subsequently the play has been produced at the Steppenwolf Theater in Chicago, the Kennedy Center in Washington, D.C., and again in Boise at Boise Contemporary Theater. The international premiere was July 7, 2007 in Sydney, Australia with Lee Lewis directing acclaimed Australian actress Robyn Nevin in the Sydney Theatre Company production.

== Plot ==
The play concerns an artist named Alex Macklin in the last years of his life, and the effect his condition has on his son, Sean, and his second and fourth wives, Toinette and Lia, respectively. After a major second stroke, Alex is left in a persistent vegetative state and the other characters convene to reach a consensus about his fate. Sean pleads for mercy killing, arguing that his father is no longer alive except in a narrow technical sense. Toinette is sympathetic to this idea but later in the play evinces doubt and uncertainty about the metaphysical nature of their undertaking. Lia is initially opposed to the idea, arguing for a natural death without intervention, though later she agrees to Sean's plan to sedate and ultimately end Alex's life with the aid of morphine. The play also contains three scenes portraying earlier episodes in Alex's life with Lia and with Toinette.

Though written before the national debate concerning Terri Schiavo, the play predicts many of the questions central to that debate and is a powerful meditation on themes of mercy and mortality in the age of advanced medical technology. DeLillo has stated "I suppose this is a play about the modern meaning of life's end. When does it end? How does it end, how should it end? What is the value of life? How do we measure it?"

== Critical reception ==
The play was received to favorable reviews. John Leonard of Harper's called the play "brilliant".
