= Emma's War (film) =

- Directed by: Clytie Jessop
- Written by: Peter Smalley; Clytie Jessop
- Produced by: Robin Dalton; Clytie Jessop; Andrena Finlay
- Starring: Miranda Otto; Lee Remick
- Narrated by: Helen McDonald
- Cinematography: Tom Cowan
- Edited by: Sonia Hoffman
- Distributed by: Curzon Film Distributors; Belinon Productions
- Release date: 19 June 1987 (United Kingdom)
- Running time: 94 minutes
- Country: Australia
- Language: English

Emma's War is a 1987 Australian drama film starring Miranda Otto and Lee Remick. Clytie Jessop made her debut directing, producing and writing this film. It was completed in 1986, and released there in 1988. This was the last feature film for Remick and David Cahill.

== Cast ==
- Lee Remick as Anne Grange
- Miranda Otto as Emma Grange
- Mark Lee as John Davidson
- Terence Donovan as Frank Grange
- Donal Gibson as Hank
- Bridey Lee as Laurel Grange
- Pat Evison as Miss Arnott
- Grigor Taylor as Dr. Friedlander
- Noeline Brown as Mrs. Mortimer
- Rebel Russell as Miss Gunz
- Mervyn Drake as Iceman
- Ashley Grenville as Brian
- Kay Eklund as Miss Clewes
- Jean Calver as Old Woman, Grog Shop
- David Cahill as Headmaster, Country School

== Production ==
Lee Remick arrived in Sydney, Australia for filming on January 15th, 1985.
