= Shauna Jensen =

Australian singer

- Origin: Australian
- Genres: Singer; backing singer; theatre performer; television judge
- Formerly of: Purple Vision, Flake

Shauna Jensen is an Australian singer, theatre performer and television judge.

== Career ==
Jensen has been a member of multiple bands including Flake, Purple Vision and McPhee where she among others did the lead vocals on a cover-version of the Neil Young song Southern Man. She was a cast member of Australia's Jesus Christ Superstar and appeared on the Original Australian Cast Recording album in 1972 and she toured nationally with the Long Way to the Top concert tour. She has performed backup vocals for many acts such as INXS, Jimmy Barnes, Billy Thorpe, Powderfinger and Hugh Jackman and she provides the vocals for many advertising campaigns. She sings on a number of tracks on the 1985 Rebel: Original Motion Picture Soundtrack. In 2004 she became a judge for the fourth season of Australia's Popstars, titled Popstars Live. She is now known as a Sydney gay icon.

== Discography ==
=== Album ===
- Something Real (1997)

=== Single ===
- "Out of the Hat" (1979) – Big Time
- "Take me to Heaven" (2001) (Paul Goodyear feat Shauna Jensen)

=== With Flake (lead vocals) ===
- "Teach Me How To Fly". b-side of "Reflections of My Life" (1970) Aus Top 30
