= Persuasion (disambiguation) =

Persuasion is a social influence.

Persuasion may also refer to:

== The Jane Austen novel and its adaptations ==
- Persuasion (novel), an 1818 novel by Jane Austen
  - Persuasion (1960 TV series), a British television miniseries based on the novel
  - Persuasion (1971 TV series), a British television miniseries based on the novel
  - Persuasion (1995 film), a television film based on the novel
  - Persuasion (2007 film), a television film based on the novel
  - Persuasion (2022 film), an American film adaptation of the novel

== Music ==
- The Persuasions, an American a cappella group
- Persuasion (Adam Ant album), an unreleased album by Adam Ant
- "Persuasion", a song from Santana, album by Santana, 1969
- Persuasion (EP), an EP by Billie Ray Martin and Spooky
- "Persuasion" (song), a song by Tim Finn from Before & After
- "Persuasion", a song by Patti Smith from Gung Ho
- "Persuasion", a song by Throbbing Gristle from 20 Jazz Funk Greats
- "Crystal Blue Persuasion", a song originally recorded by Tommy James and the Shondells, 1968

== Other uses ==
- Persuasion (comics), a Marvel Comics superhero
- Adobe Persuasion, a discontinued presentation software
- Persuasion (magazine), a nonprofit digital magazine

== See also ==
- Peitho (English translation: Persuasion), the personification of persuasion in Greek mythology
- Persuader (disambiguation)
