= TV Follies =

Australian television series

- Starring: Gus Mercurio; Max Cullen; Noni Hazlehurst
- Country of origin: Australia
- Original language: English
- No. of seasons: 1
- No. of episodes: 4

Production
- Executive producer: Ric Birch
- Running time: 60 minutes

Original release
- Network: ABC
- Release: 2 June – 23 June 1979

TV Follies is an Australian television series that aired on ABC in 1979. It was a series of four separate musicals. The musicals were set in a speakeasy in Chicago, a troop ship, a film set in Hollywood, and in New Orleans. It debuted on Saturday 2 June and finished on 23 June. The Hollywood episode won a Sammy Award for best variety program.

== Episodes ==
- Chicago

Gus Mercurio as Maxy Missouri, Max Cullen as Cheesy Parmesi, Noni Hazlehurst as Silver Le Bow, David Atkins as Bernie Goldman, Robyn Moase as Slats Molloy, Ron Blanchard as Police chief O'Flannery

- Troopship (aka SS Kalgoorlie)

Debbie Byrne, Julie McGregor, Ian Turpie, Peter Brandon, David Atkins

- Hollywood

Normie Rowe as Bruce Baxter, Debbie Byrne as Laura, Kathy Lloyd, Jane Harders as Linda Zimmerman, Arthur Dignam, David Atkins, Terry Bader, Virginia Portingale

- New Orleans

Freddie Paris as Ace Dupree, Delilah, Norman Erskine, Max Cullen as Cyrus P Sanders, Linda Nagel as Hannah, Ian Turpie, Brenda Kristen, David Atkins
