= Jonte Flowers =

American professional basketball player

Personal information
- Born: April 12, 1985 (age 41) Chicago, Illinois
- Listed height: 6 ft 5 in (1.96 m)
- Listed weight: 198 lb (90 kg)

Career information
- High school: La Follette (Madison, Wisconsin)
- College: Winona State (2004–2008)
- NBA draft: 2008: undrafted
- Playing career: 2008–2019
- Position: Small forward

Career history
- 2008–2009: Solna Vikings
- 2009–2010: JA Vichy
- 2010–2011: Hyères-Toulon
- 2011–2012: JA Vichy
- 2012: Solna Vikings
- 2012–2013: Kataja
- 2013–2015: CSU Asesoft Ploiești
- 2015–2016: Fortitudo Bologna
- 2016–2017: Timișoara
- 2017–2018: Juventus Utena
- 2018: CSA Steaua Bucuresti
- 2018–2019: Trefl Sopot

Career highlights
- 2× NCAA Division II champion (2006, 2008); 4× NSIC Defensive Player of the Year (2005–2008); 2× First-team All-NSIC (2007, 2008)

Jermaine "Jonte" Flowers (born April 12, 1985) is an American former professional basketball player.

== Career ==
Flowers signed with the Romanian team CSU Asesoft Ploiești for the 2013–14 season. After 6 games, 4 in the Romanian league and 2 in the EuroCup, Flowers tore his achilles tendon. In July 2014, he extended his contract with Asesoft for one more season. In July 2015, he signed with Italian team Fortitudo Bologna.

== Honours ==
(Finland) Joensuun Kataja

- Korisliiga Bronze medal (1): 2012–13

== Statistics ==
Legend
GP	Games played	MPG	Minutes per game	FG%	Field goal percentage
3P%	3-point field goal percentage	FT%	Free throw percentage	RPG	Rebounds per game
APG	Assists per game	SPG	Steals per game	BPG	Blocks per game
PPG	Points per game	**Bold**	Career high		Led the league

Year	Team	League	GP	MPG	FG%	3P%	FT%	RPG	APG	SPG	BPG	PPG	
2012–13	(Finland) Joensuun Kataja	Korisliiga	45 (Note: Including Playoff games.)		30.8	.538	.385	.772	6.1	2.4	2.5	0.6	16.8

== Personal life ==
Flowers is married to Jennifer Flowers, a former athlete at Winona State and current vice-president and women's commissioner of the Western Collegiate Hockey Association.
