= Nicholas Gledhill =

Australian actor

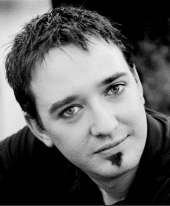
- Born: Nicholas Martin Gledhill; 7 March 1975 (age 51); Sydney, Australia
- Education: Birmingham School of Speech and Drama
- Occupations: Actor and voice actor
- Years active: 1984–present

Nicholas Martin Gledhill (born 7 March 1975) is an Australian film and stage actor, voice artist, writer and choreographer.

== Biography ==
Gledhill was born in Sydney, New South Wales to parents Bobbie Gledhill and actor Arthur Dignam. He grew up in Glebe, New South Wales and attended St Andrew's Cathedral School. At the age of 19 he moved to England, to try out for drama school and attended Birmingham School of Speech and Drama from which he graduated in 1998.

He is possibly best known for one of his early roles, that of PS in Careful, He Might Hear You (1983), the story of a young boy in the middle of a custody battle between his two aunts based on the novel by Sumner Locke Elliott. Gledhill was nominated for a Best Actor award by the Australian Film Institute for this role in 1984.

Gledhill has worked mainly in film and television, and as a Stage Combat Master and choreographer, an acting teacher and is a prize-winning writer (ICI/STC Young Writers Competition).

Some of his stage roles include Edgar and Sebastian in the Shakespeare Globe Centre Australia's production of King Lear and The Tempest. He was featured in a Sunday Life article on child stars and performed various roles at the Edinburgh Festival, in a collection of 12 short plays called Light Bites and Tasty Treats.

In 2010 he played Demetrius, in the Acting Factory production of A Midsummer Night's Dream, and in the same year played the role of Watch in the SpaceCraft Productions production of the official Sydney Fringe Festival selection, Closing Time.

Nicholas, along with PJ Collins, founded the Arts Party in October 2013 and registered by the Australian Electoral Commission in August 2014. Creation of the Party was inspired by the importance of the arts and of creative action.

Money for the party's registration was raised through a crowdfunding campaign on indiegogo to gather the funds and the list of signed-up members required to register the party. Although the Party garnered a large amount of support at the time of its creation, it was voluntarily deregistered with the Australian Electoral Commission on 25 June 2019, but remains registered for local elections with the New South Wales Electoral Commission.

== Personal life ==
He lives in Sydney with his wife, Amelia, and their two children, Tigerlily and Wolfgang.

== Filmography ==
Production	Type	Company	Role	Also featuring	Year
Dead Down Under	Film	Terror Australis	Carlisle		2012
Wild Boys	TV	Seven Network	Cobb & Co Passenger	Daniel MacPherson, Michael Dorman	2011
Panasonic TV / Olympics	Commercial	Panasonic	Man on couch		2008
Guardian Angel	Film	International Film School Sydney	James		2008
Lucky Restaurant	Commercial	Lucky Lotteries	Waiter		2006
ESL Training	Voice		Various		2004
The Chaser – CNNNN	TV	Crackerjack	Larry	Charles Firth, Andrew Hansen, Julian Morrow, Chas Licciardello, Dominic Knight, Anna Skellern	2002
The Man Who Sued God	Feature	Dir: Mark Joffe	Various V/O	Billy Connolly, Peter Whitford	2001
Speaking of Angela	Radio Play	University of Technology, Sydney Student Production	David	Raelee Hill	2000
Così	Feature	Smiley Films			1995
G.P.	TV	RCC	Jack		1993
Hard Copy	TV	Network Ten	Disabled Boy		1991
Dead to the World	Feature	Huzzah Productions			1991
The Way to Ward Five	Feature	Honky Tonk Angel Productions	Julian Ross		1989
The Dirtwater Dynasty	TV	Honky Tonk Angel Productions	Julian Ross		1988
Black Beauty	Animated Feature	Burbank Animation Studios	Bertie Gordon (V/O)		1987
Jo Wilson	TV	Bilgola Beach Prods	Young Wilson		1986
Blinky Bill	TV	Australian Broadcasting Corporation	Ranger Ken		1985
A Country Practice	TV	JNP Films	Matthew Brookes	Shane Porteous, Georgie Parker, Lorrae Desmond, Anne Tenney, Brian Wenzel	1984
Bodyline	TV	Kennedy Miller	Young Jardine	Arthur Dignam, Carl Schultz, Hugo Weaving	1984
Careful, He Might Hear You	Feature	Syme Entertainment	P.S.	Robyn Nevin, Wendy Hughes, John Hargreaves, Colleen Clifford, Peter Whitford	1983

== Stage ==
Production	Company	Role	Also featuring	Year
Women, Power and Culture	The New Theatre	Mr Rossi		2011
Closing Time	SpaceCraft Productions	Watch		2010
A Midsummer Night's Dream	Acting Factory	Demetrius		2010
Light Bites and Tasty Treats	Straylight Australia	Various		2009
Fallen Angels	Factory Space Theatre	Fred		2008
Hamlet	Shakespeare Globe Centre Australia	Rosencrantz	Arianwen Parkes-Lockwood	2005
The Tempest	Shakespeare Globe Centre Australia	Sebastian		2004
King Lear (return Season)	Shakespeare Globe Centre Australia	Edgar		2004
Real Estate	Company of Players	Simon		2004
King Lear	Shakespeare Globe Centre Australia	Edgar		2003
Camelot	Blue Mountains Musical Society	Arthur		2002
Moving In	Company of Players	Simon		2001
Peter Pan	MEAG / Henson's Creature Shop	John Darling	Jim Henson's Creature Shop, Philip Quast	2000
A Midsummer Night's Dream	New Theatre (Newtown)	Starvling		1999
The Venetian Twins	Zenith Theatre	Arleccino		1999
Having it All	ANT HILL Productions	Mark		1996
Life of Galileo	Sydney University Dramatic Society	Various		1994
Time to Remember...	Cellar Theatre	Writer		1994
The Crucible		John Procter		1991
