= Sleeping Child (album) =

Studio album by Debra Byrne
- Released: April 1994
- Studio: Sing Sing Studios, The Vault, Studios 301
- Genre: Pop rock
- Label: Mushroom Records
- Producer: Debra Byrne, Mark Moffatt

Debra Byrne albums chronology
| Caught in the Act (1991) | Sleeping Child (1994) | New Ways to Dream (1997) |

Sleeping Child is the fourth studio album by Australian recording artist Debra Byrne. The album was released in April 1994 and includes songs about her children, relationships, sexual abuse, substance dependence, loss and grief. Sleeping Child peaked at number 81 on the ARIA Charts.

== Reception ==
Mike Daly of The Canberra Times described the album as a "strong adult contemporary recording in a country-flavored rock style, and the songs bear the imprint of experience and hard-won maturity." Byrne told Daly that "If I'd written it all myself, I probably wouldn't have made the album. The songs are all co-written and, although the majority of the sources have been my own concepts, I don't hear them as autobiographical." Daly's fellow journalist, Naomi Mapstone felt her "well-trained voice, and obvious grasp of the technical aspects of her craft are evident throughout... You keep expecting something more powerful and spontaneous."

== Track listing ==
| No. | Title | Writer(s) | Length |
|---|---|---|---|
| 1. | "Diamond in the Rough" | Shawn Colvin, John Leventhal | 4:08 |
| 2. | "Firing Line" | | 4:28 |
| 3. | "Stay Just a Little" | | 4:29 |
| 4. | "Naw Snap" | | 5:13 |
| 5. | "Hearts Filled with Anger" | | 3:50 |
| 6. | "If It's Not What You Say" | | 3:40 |
| 7. | "Sleeping Child" | | 4:43 |
| 8. | "These Old Lies" | | 2:52 |
| 9. | "Warm Blanket of Love" | | 4:03 |
| 10. | "Nearly Home" | | 3:22 |
| 11. | "So Soon" | | 4:10 |
| 12. | "Don't Take This Love Away" | | 3:49 |

== Charts ==
| Chart (1994) | Peak position |
|---|---|
| Australia (ARIA) | 81 |
