= Caught in the Act (Debra Byrne album) =

Studio album by Debbie Byrne
- Released: April 1991
- Genre: Stage and Screen
- Label: Mushroom Records
- Producer: Graeme Lyall

Debbie Byrne albums chronology
Rebel: Original Motion Picture Soundtrack (1985)	Caught in the Act (1991)	Sleeping Child (1994)

Caught in the Act is the third studio album by Australian recording artist Debbie Byrne. The album was released in April 1991 and peaked at number 2 on the ARIA Charts.

At the ARIA Music Awards of 1992, the album was nominated for Best Adult Contemporary Album.

== Track listing ==
No.	Title	Writer(s)	Length
1.	"Oh, What a Beautiful Mornin'"	Oscar Hammerstein II, Richard Rodgers	3:20
2.	"Wouldn't It Be Loverly"	Frederick Loewe, Alan Jay Lerner	2:43
3.	"Every Day a Little Death"	Stephen Sondheim	2:51
4.	"I Dreamed a Dream"	Claude-Michel Schönberg, Herbert Kretzmer	4:38
5.	"What's the Use of Wond'rin'"	Hammerstein II, Rodgers	3:50
6.	"Younger Than Springtime"	Hammerstein II, Rodgers	3:57
7.	"Edelweiss"	Hammerstein II, Rodgers	1:50
8.	"Memory"	Andrew Lloyd Webber, Trevor Nunn	5:00
9.	"Tell Me on a Sunday"	Lloyd Webber, Don Black	3:37
10.	"I'd Do Anything"	Lionel Bart	2:35
11.	"Medley from The King and I"	Hammerstein II, Rodgers	11:10

The track "I'd Do Anything" features her two daughters Arja and Lauren.

== Charts ==
=== Weekly charts ===
Chart (1991)	Peak position
Australian Albums (ARIA)	2

=== Year-end charts ===
Chart (1991)	Peak position
Australia (ARIA)	65

== Certifications ==
Region	Certification	Certified units/sales
Australia (ARIA)	Gold	35,000^{^}
^{^} Shipments figures based on certification alone.
