= New Ways to Dream =

Studio album by Debra Byrne
- Released: May 1997
- Label: Polydor Records
- Producer: Graeme Lyall

Debra Byrne albums chronology
Sleeping Child (1994)	New Ways to Dream (1997)

New Ways to Dream is the fifth studio album by Australian recording artist Debra Byrne. The album was released in May 1997 and peaked at number 41 on the ARIA Charts.

== Track listing ==
No.	Title	Writer(s)	Length
1.	"Easy Terms"	Willy Russell	3:46
2.	"Surrender"	Andrew Lloyd Webber, Don Black, Christopher Hampton	2:03
3.	"With One Look"	Lloyd Webber, Black, Hampton	3:16
4.	"Another Suitcase in Another Hall"	Tim Rice, Lloyd Webber	3:03
5.	"Nothing Like You've Ever Known"	Lloyd Webber, Black, Richard Maltby, Jr.	3:45
6.	"No One is Alone / Children Will Listen" (with Hugh Jackman)	Stephen Sondheim	7:27
7.	"The Millworker"	James Taylor	3:39
8.	"If I Loved You"	Oscar Hammerstein II, Richard Rodgers	4:37
9.	"On the Street Where You Live"	Frederick Loewe, Alan Jay Lerner	3:38
10.	"Long Ago and Far Away"	David Atkins	3:53
11.	"Being Alive"	Stephen Sondheim	4:33
12.	"Always"	William May, Jason Sprague	4:09
13.	"As If We Never Said Goodbye"	Black, Lloyd Webber, Hampton	4:56
14.	"As Long as He Needs Me"	Lionel Bart	5:04

== Charts ==
Chart (1997)	Peak position
Australian Albums (ARIA)	41
