= The Wild Duck (film) =

- Directed by: Henri Safran
- Written by: Tutte Lemkow; John Lind; Dido Merwin; Henri Safran; Peter Smalley (additional material)
- Based on: play The Wild Duck by Henrik Ibsen
- Produced by: Phillip Emmanuel
- Starring: Jeremy Irons; Liv Ullmann
- Cinematography: Peter James
- Edited by: Don Saunders
- Music by: Simon Walker
- Release date: 1984
- Running time: 95 minutes
- Country: Australia
- Language: English
- Box office: A$115,664 (Australia)

The Wild Duck is a 1984 Australian film directed by Henri Safran and starring Jeremy Irons and Liv Ullmann. It was adapted from the 1884 play by Henrik Ibsen, with the drama relocated to Tasmania in 1913.

== Cast ==
- Liv Ullmann as Gina
- Jeremy Irons as Harold
- Lucinda Jones as Henrietta
- John Meillon as Major Ackland
- Arthur Dignam as Gregory
- Michael Pate as George
- Colin Croft as Mollison
- Rhys McConnochie as Dr. Roland
- Marion Edward as Bertha
- Peter Desalis as Peters
- Jeff Truman as Johnson
- Marion Edward as Mrs Summers

== Soundtrack albums ==
The music score for this movie by Simon Walker was released as soundtrack albums in 1988 by Southern Cross Records (SCCD 1019) and in 2019 by Dragon's Domain Records (DDR661).

== See also ==
- The Daughter, another adaptation of the play
