= Robyn Nevin =

Australian actress (born 1942)

Robyn Nevin AO
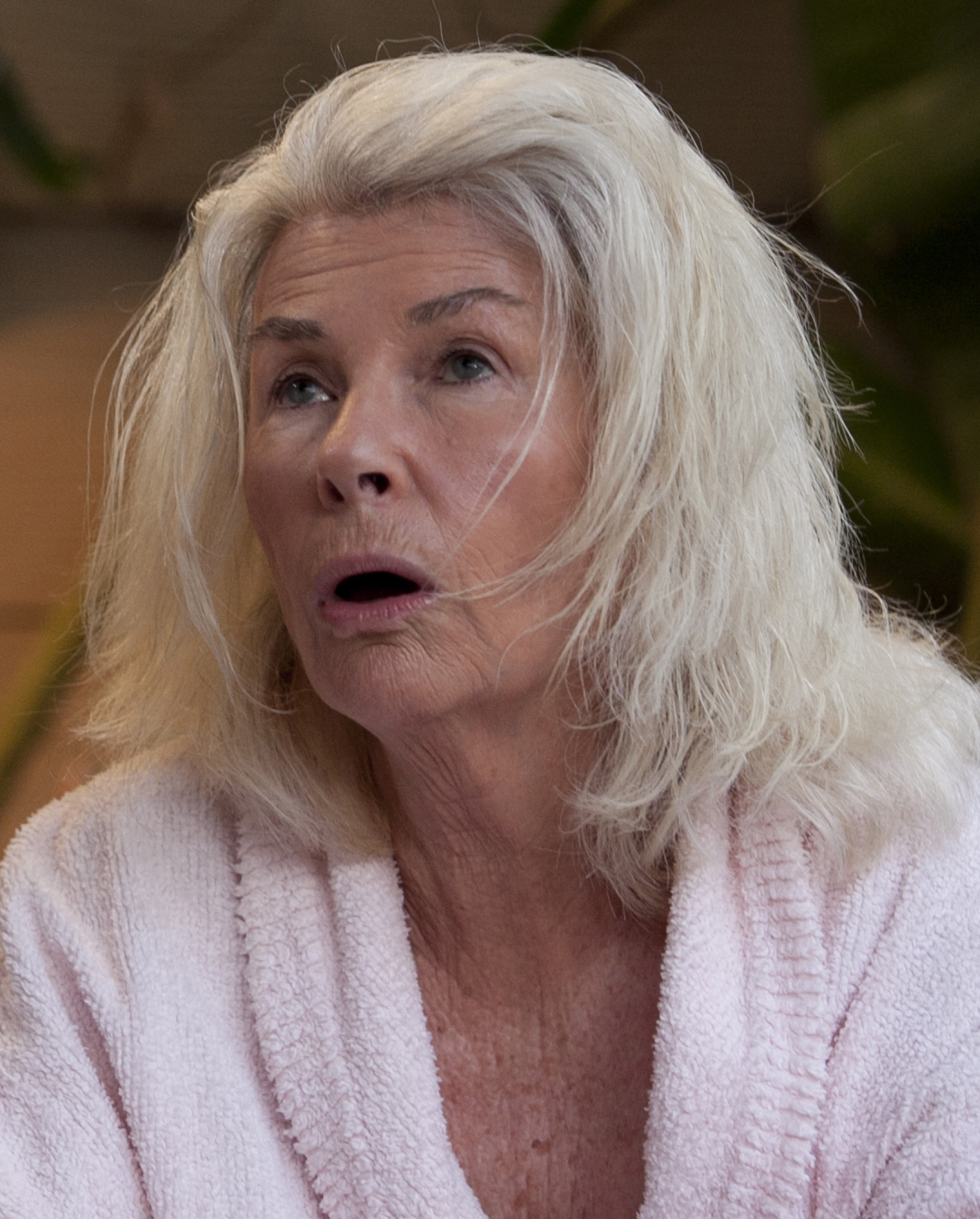
- Nevin in 2013
- Born: 25 September 1942 (age 84); Melbourne, Australia
- Education: National Institute of Dramatic Art (BFA)
- Occupation: Actress
- Years active: 1962–present
- Spouse: Barry Crook (divorced) Jim McNeil (m. 1975; div. 1977)
- Partner: Nicholas Hammond (1987–present)
- Children: 1

Robyn Anne Nevin AO (25 September 1942) is an Australian actress recognised with the Sidney Myer Performing Arts Awards and the JC Williamson Award at the Helpmann Awards for her outstanding contributions to Australian theatre performance art. Former head of both the Queensland Theatre Company and the Sydney Theatre Company, she has directed more than 30 productions and acted in more than 80 plays, collaborating with internationally renowned artists, including Richard Wherrett, Simon Phillips, Geoffrey Rush, Julie Andrews, Aubrey Mellor, Jennifer Flowers, Cate Blanchett and Lee Lewis.

Nevin is also known for her roles in films and televisions series, including Water Under the Bridge (1980) as Shasta, role that earned her a Logie Awards and a Penguin Award, Upper Middle Bogan (2014) and Top of the Lake (2014), and international film acting as Councillor Dillard in The Matrix Reloaded and The Matrix Revolutions (both 2003), and as Edna in the horror film Relic (2020).

== Early life ==
Nevin was born on 25 September 1942 in Melbourne, to Josephine Pauline Casey and William George Nevin. She was educated at Genazzano Convent until the age of 11, when she moved with her family to Hobart, Tasmania, and was enrolled at the Fahan School, a non-denominational school for girls. While there, she played the lead in the school's production of Snow White at the Theatre Royal. Her parents were conservative and conventional, her father the managing director of Dunlop Australia, her mother a housewife, so to enter the National Institute of Dramatic Art (NIDA) at the age of 16 in the very first intake in 1959 was a brave step, in which she was fully supported by her parents.

== Career ==
At the outset of her career, she had a variety of roles in radio and television, working mainly at the Australian Broadcasting Commission, including current affairs, music, chat shows and children's shows throughout the early 1960s. With the Old Tote Theatre Company she acted in The Legend of King O'Malley by Bob Ellis and Michael Boddy in 1970. She gravitated back to theatre, where she has been a constant presence for the last 40 years.

Although theatre has been her home ground she has also starred in numerous Australian films and mini-series, landing many credits for strong supporting roles. She made one foray into directing in The More Things Change... (1986).

In 1996 she became artistic director of the Queensland Theatre Company, a position which she held with great success, rescuing the company from bankruptcy and leaving it flourishing in 1999, when she took over the position of artistic director of the Sydney Theatre Company, where she was artistic director until the end of 2007, having created such memorable additions as The Actor's Company, the only professional repertory company in the nation, and the hugely successful Wharf Revue.

In 2006 she established The STC Actors Company and directed its debut production of Brecht's Mother Courage and Her Children. Her other extensive directing credits for Sydney Theatre Company include: Boy Gets Girl (2005), Summer Rain (2005), Scenes from a Separation (2004), Hedda Gabler (2004), Harbour (2004), The Real Thing (2003), A Doll's House (2002) and Hanging Man (2002).

Other directing credits include After the Ball, Honour, Summer Rain and A Month in the Country (Queensland Theatre Company); Kid Stakes, Scenes from a Separation, Summer of the Seventeenth Doll and On Top of the World (Melbourne Theatre Company); The Removalists (State Theatre of South Australia) and The Marriage of Figaro (State Opera of South Australia).

Nevin has performed in a range of roles at the Sydney Theatre Company, beginning in 1979 as Miss Docker in A Cheery Soul by Patrick White (reprised in 2001); and also including as Roxane in Cyrano de Bergerac in 1981; as Ranyevskaya in The Cherry Orchard by Anton Chekhov in 2005; and as Mrs Venable in Suddenly Last Summer by Tennessee Williams in 2015.

== Filmography ==
=== Film ===
Year	Title	Role	Type
1973	Libido	Sister Caroline (segment ‘The Priest’)	Feature film
1973	Reflections		Film short
1975	Something Other		Film short
1976	Caddie	Black Eye	Feature film
1976	Dr. K		Film short
1976	The Fourth Wish	Connie	Feature film
1978	The Irishman	Jenny Doolan	Feature film
1978	Marx		Film short
1978	The Clown and the Mind Reader		Film short
1979	Temperament Unsuited	Anne	Film short
1980	Tread Softly	Claire	Film short
1981	Letting Go		Film short
1982	Fighting Back	Mary	Feature film
1983	Goodbye Paradise	Kate	Feature film
1983	Careful, He Might Hear You	Lila	Feature film
1984	The Coolangatta Gold	Robyn Lukas	Feature film
1988	Emerald City	Kate Rogers	Feature film
1992	Resistance	Wiley	Feature film
1992	Greenkeeping	Mum	Feature film
1994	Lucky Break	Anne-Marie LePine	Feature film
1995	Angel Baby	Dr. Norberg	Feature film
1997	The Castle	Supreme Court Judge	Feature film
2003	The Matrix Reloaded	Councillor Dillard	Feature film
2003	Bad Eggs	Eleanor Poulgrain	Feature film
2003	The Matrix Revolutions	Councillor Dillard	Feature film
2011	The Eye of the Storm	Lal	Feature film
2013	The Turning	Carol Lang	Feature film (segment ‘Reunion’)
2015	Ruben Guthrie	Susan Guthrie	Feature film
2016	Gods of Egypt	Sharifa	Feature film
2018	Death in Bloom	Mrs. Patterson	Film short
2020	Groundhog Night	Rose	Film short
2020	Relic	Edna	Feature film
2022	Lacerate	Jeanne	Film short
2023	The Appleton Ladies' Potato Race	Joan Bunyan	Feature film
2024	Sting	Gunter	
2026	Fing!	Chief Librarian	

=== Television ===
Year	Title	Role	Notes
1961	The Outcasts		TV series
1962	Consider Your Verdict	Judith Harper	TV series, 1 episode: "Queen Versus Glandon"
1967	Bellbird		TV series
1971	The Comedy Game	Kate Sullivan	TV series, 1 episode: "Our Man in Canberra"
1973	Our Man in the Company	Miss Healey	TV series, 1 episode: "Let Women Go Free"
1973	The Taming of the Shrew	Barmaid	TV film
1973	How Could You Believe Me When I Said I'd Be Your Valet When You Know I've Been a Liar All My Life?		Teleplay
1973	President Wilson in Paris	Mrs. Wilson	Teleplay
1974	Matlock Police	Sue Palmer	TV series, 1 episode: "Dancing Class"
1974	Ryan	Susan Davis	TV series, 1 episode: "Negative Proof"
1974; 1975	Behind the Legend	Guest roles	TV series, 1 episode: "William Bligh" (1974)
1975	Ben Hall		TV series, 1 episode
1975	Behind the Legend	Guest role	TV series, 1 episode: "ST Gill"
1976	God Knows Why, But It Works	Nurse	Film documentary
1977	Say You Want Me	Interviewing Officer	TV film
1978	Father, Dear Father	Mrs. Webster	TV series, episode 4: "Novel Exercise"
1979	The Oracle		TV series, 1 episode
1980	Notes on a Landscape	Herself	Film documentary
1980	Water Under the Bridge	Shasta	TV miniseries, 8 episodes
1980	The Sullivans	Rachael Dawson	TV series, 2 episodes
1980	A Toast to Melba	Nellie Melba	TV film
1980	Spring & Fall	Mary	TV series, Series 1, episode 2: "The Last Card"
1981	Oz '81	Various characters	TV series
1981	Degrees of Change		Teleplay
1982	The Naked Breast	Narrator	Film documentary
1982	Spring & Fall	Anne	TV series, Season 2, episode 2:"Perfect Company"
1983	The Dismissal	Lady Kerr	TV miniseries, 3 episodes
1983	For Love or Money	Herself	Film documentary
1984	Conferenceville	Dr Cindy Broughton	TV film
1984	Making 'The Coolangatta Gold'	Herself (uncredited)	Film special
1985	Hanlon	Minnie Dean	TV series, episode: "In Defence of Minnie Dean"
1990	The Ham Funeral	Mrs. Goosgog	Teleplay
1990	Shadows of the Heart	Mrs. Hanlon	TV miniseries, 2 episodes
1993	Seven Deadly Sins	Margot	TV series, episode 3: 'Sloth'
1993	The Burning Piano: A Portrait of Patrick White	Herself	TV film
1995–99	Halifax f.p.	Angela Halifax	TV film series, 3 episodes: "The Feeding", "Cradle and All", "A Murder of Crows"
2003	Enter the Matrix	Councillor Dillard (voice)	Video game
2013-16	Upper Middle Bogan	Margaret Denyar	TV series, 24 episodes
2013-16	Top of the Lake	Jude Griffin	TV series, 4 episodes: "1.1", "1.3", "1.4", "1.5"
2013-16	The Broken Shore	Cecily Addison	TV film "3.5", "3.7"
2014	Rake	Banking Counsel Assisting	TV series, 2 episodes
2015	Stories I Wanted to Tell You in Person	Anna	TV film
2016	Cleverman	Jane O'Grady	TV series, episode: "Containment"
2018	Back in Very Small Business	Celeste Di Nonno	TV series, 8 episodes
2019	Doctor Doctor	Dinah	TV series, Season 4, 3 episodes
2020	In Creative Company	Herself	Podcast series, 1 episode
2020	The End	Dawn	TV series, 8 episodes
2021	The Moth Effect	Voice of M	TV series, 1 episode
2022	Wolf Like Me	Gwen	TV series, 1 episode
2022	God's Favorite Idiot	Helen	TV series, 1 episode
2025	Apple Cider Vinegar	Alma Hirsch	TV series, 2 episodes

=== Other appearances ===
Year	Title	Role	Notes
2015	The Making of 'Ruben Guthrie'	Herself / Susan Guthrie	Video
2012	Raising the Curtain	Interviewee	TV series
2007	In the Company of Actors	Herself	TV special
2003	Over Easy: On Location With 'Bad Eggs'	Herself	Video
2001	Burke's Backyard	Guest Celebrity Gardener	TV series, 1 episode
2001	Australian Story	Herself	TV series, 1 episode
1998	The Edge of the Possible	Narrator (voice)	TV documentary
1998	Witness	Herself	TV series, 1 episode
1998	Australian Story	Herself	TV series, 1 episode
1998	Denise	Guest	TV series, 1 episode
1994	Ernie and Denise	Guest	TV series, 1 episode
1994	Rites of Passage	Narrator	TV documentary

== Theatre and musical ==
=== Sydney Theatre Company and other ===
Sydney Theatre Company is an Australian theatre company based in Sydney, New South Wales, which performs at The Wharf Theatre, the Roslyn Packer Theatre and the Sydney Opera House. Nevin was associate artistic director from 1984 to 1987, and first artistic director from 1999 to 2007, producing twenty plays. She has also acted in twenty-seven productions of the company.

Artistic Director

=== Theatre ===
Title	Years	Role	Location	Notes
Macbeth	1980		Nimrod Theatre Company	
Close of Play	1980	Margaret	Sydney Opera House	Stage musical; directed by Rodney Fisher
The Precious Woman	1980	Su-Ling	Sydney Opera House	Stage musical; directed by Richard Wherrett
Cyrano de Bergerac	1981	Roxanne	Sydney Opera House	Stage musical; directed by Richard Wherrett
Macbeth	1982	Lady Macbeth	Sydney Opera House	Stage musical; directed by Richard Wherrett
The Perfectionist	1982	Barbara	Sydney Opera House	Stage musical; written by David Williamson, directed by Rodney Fisher
The Way of the World	1983	Millamant	Sydney Opera House	Stage musical; directed by Richard Wherrett
Present Laughter	1983	Gussie	Theatre Royal	Stage musical; written by Noël Coward, directed by Richard Wherrett
The Perfectionist	1984	Barbara	Sydney Opera House	Stage musical written by David Williamson, directed by Rodney Fisher
The Perfect Mismatch	1984	–	Wharf Theatre	Stage musical; writer and director
Heartbreak House	1985	–	Wharf Theatre	Stage musical; writer and director
Family Favourites	1985	–	Wharf Theatre	Stage musical; writer and director
Mixed Doubles	1986	Queen Dollallola	Wharf Theatre	Stage musical; directed by Michael Scott-Mitchell
The Seagull	1986	Arkadina	Wharf Theatre	Stage musical; directed by Jean-Pierre Mignon
Siesta in a Pink Hotel	1987	–	Wharf Theatre	Stage musical; writer and director
The Philadelphia Story	1987	–	Sydney Opera House	Stage musical; writer and director
Emerald City	1987	Kate	Sydney Opera House	Stage musical; written by David Williamson, directed by Richard Wherrett
Tom & Viv	1987	Viv	Sydney Opera House	Stage musical; directed by Aubrey Mellor
Woman in Mind	1987	Susan	Sydney Opera House	Stage musical; written by Alan Ayckbourn, directed by Richard Wherrett
Big and Little	1988	Lotte	Wharf Theatre	Stage musical; directed by Harald Clemen
The Ham Funeral	1989	First Lady	Wharf Theatre	Stage musical; directed by Neil Armfield
The Removalists	1991	–	Wharf Theatre	Stage musical; director
The Girl who saw Everything	1992	–	Wharf Theatre	Stage musical; director
The Recruit	1999	–	Wharf Theatre	Stage musical; director
Corporate Vibes	1999	–	Wharf Theatre	Stage musical; writer and director
The Great Man	2000	–	Sydney Opera House	Stage musical; director
Life After George	2000	Various characters	Sydney Opera House	Play; written by Hannie Rayson, directed by Marion Potts
A Cheery Soul	2000	Miss Docker	Wharf Theatre	Stage musical; directed by Jim Sharman
Old Masters	2001	Lillian Fromm	Wharf Theatre	Stage musical; directed by Benedict Andrews
The Glass Menagerie	2002	Amanda Wingfield	Wharf Theatre	Stage musical; directed by Jennifer Flowers
A Doll's House	2002	–	Wharf Theatre	Stage musical; written by Henrik Ibsen
Hanging Man	2002	–	Wharf Theatre	Stage musical
Major Barbara	2003	–	Wharf Theatre	Stage musical
The Real Thing	2003	–	Wharf Theatre	Stage musical
The Breath of Life	2003	Madeleine	Sydney Opera House	Stage musical; written by Sir David Hare, directed by Max Stafford-Clark
Hedda Gabler	2004	–	Wharf Theatre	Stage musical
Scenes from Separation	2004	–	Wharf Theatre	Stage musical
Summer Rain	2005	–	Wharf Theatre	Stage musical
Boy Gets Girl	2005	–	Wharf Theatre	Stage musical
The Cherry Orchard	2005	Ranyevskaya	Wharf Theatre	Stage musical; directed by Howard Davies
Hedda Gabler	2006	–	Wharf Theatre	Stage musical;
Mother Courage and Her Children	2006	–	Wharf Theatre	Stage musical
Love Lies Bleeding	2007	Toinette	Wharf Theatre	Stage musical; written by Don DeLillo, directed by Lee Lewis
The Women of Troy	2008	Joan	Wharf Theatre	Stage musical; directed by Barrie Kosky
The Year of Magical Thinking	2008-2009	Joan Didion	Wharf Theatre	Stage musical; written by Joan Didion, directed by Cate Blanchett
Long Day's Journey into Night	2010	Mary Tyrone	Sydney Opera House	Stage musical; directed by Andrew Upton
Suddenly Last Summer	2015	Mrs Venable	Wharf Theatre	Stage musical; directed by Kip Williams
King Lear	2015	Fool	Wharf Theatre	Stage musical; directed by Neil Armfield
A German Life	2021	Brunhilde Pomsel|	Adelaide Festival	Stage musical; directed by Neil Armfield

=== Melbourne Theatre Company ===
Melbourne Theatre Company is an Australian theatre company based in Melbourne, Victoria, which performs at the Southbank Theatre, the Arts Centre Melbourne and the Malthouse. Nevin directed four plays in the 90s and she was the artistic director of the company with Pamela Rabe, Aidan Fennessy in 2012. She has also acted in fourteen productions of the company.

Artistic Director

Title	Years	Role	Location	Notes
Who's Afraid of Virginia Woolf?	1984	Martha	Arts Centre Melbourne	Stage musical; directed by Roger Hodgman
The Cherry Orchard	1989	Madam Ranevskaya	Arts Centre Melbourne	Stage musical; directed by Roger Hodgman
The House of Blue Leaves	1990	Bunny	Arts Centre Melbourne	Stage musical; directed by Roger Hodgman
On Top of the World	1990	–	Arts Centre Melbourne	Stage musical; director
Lady Windermere's Fan - 2	1995	Lady Windemere	Arts Centre Melbourne	Stage musical; directed by Roger Hodgman
Summer of the Seventeenth Doll	1995	–	Arts Centre Melbourne	Stage musical; director
Scenes from a Separation	1995	–	Arts Centre Melbourne	Stage musical; director
Kid Stakes	1996	–	Arts Centre Melbourne	Stage musical; director
A Cheery Soul	1996	Miss Docker	Arts Centre Melbourne	Stage musical; directed by Neil Armfield
Julius Caesar	1996	Mark Antony	Arts Centre Melbourne	Stage musical; directed by Simon Phillips
Master Class	1997	Maria Callas	Arts Centre Melbourne	Stage musical; directed by Rodney Fisher
Amy's View - 2	1998	Esme Allen	Arts Centre Melbourne	Stage musical; directed by Simon Phillips
August: Osage County	2009	Violet Weston	Arts Centre Melbourne	Stage musical; directed by Simon Phillips
The Drowsy Chaperone	2010	Mrs Tottendale	Arts Centre Melbourne	Stage musical; directed by Simon Phillips
Apologia	2011	Kristin Miller	Arts Centre Melbourne	Stage musical; directed by Simon Phillips
Queen Lear	2012	Lear	Arts Centre Melbourne	Stage musical; directed by Rachel McDonald
Other Desert Cities	2013	Polly Wyeth	Arts Centre Melbourne	Stage musical; directed by Sam Strong
Neighbourhood Watch	2014	Ana	Arts Centre Melbourne	Stage musical; directed by Simon Stone

== Awards & honours ==
Nevin has won multiple Helpmann, Green Room and Sydney Theatre Awards for her theatre work. Her Helpmann Awards include Best Female Actor in a Play for Women of Troy, Best Female Actor in a Supporting Role in a Play for Summer of the Seventeenth Doll and Angels in America, and Best Female Actor in a Supporting Role in a Musical for My Fair Lady.

In 1981, she won the TV Logie award in the 'Best Lead Actress in a Miniseries or Telemovie' category for her role as Shasta in Water Under The Bridge on the Ten Network. She had already won Logies as 'Most Popular Female' in Tasmania in 1965 and 1967 during her stint at the ABC.

On 8 June 1981, she was made a Member of the Order of Australia for services to the performing arts. She was promoted to Officer in the 2020 Queen's Birthday Honours for " distinguished service to the performing arts as an acclaimed actor and artistic director, and as a mentor and role model ".

In 1999 she was awarded an honorary doctorate from the University of Tasmania.

On 21 January 2004 she gave the Australia Day Address.

=== Film & television awards ===
Association	Year	Work	Category	Result	Ref.
AACTA Awards	1977	The Fourth Wish	Best Actress in a Lead Role	Nominated	
AACTA Awards	1983	Careful, He Might Hear You	Best Actress in a Supporting Role	Nominated	
AACTA Awards	2014	Upper Middle Bogan	Best Performance in a Television Comedy	Nominated	
AACTA Awards	2014	Top of the Lake	Best Guest or Supporting Actress in a Television Drama	Nominated	
AACTA Awards	2018	Back in Very Small Business	Best Performance in a Television Comedy	Nominated	
Fangoria Chainsaw Awards	2021	Relic	Best Supporting Performance	Nominated	
Equity Ensemble Awards	2014	Upper Middle Bogan	Outstanding Performance by an Ensemble in a Comedy Series	Won	
Equity Ensemble Awards	2014	Top of the Lake	Outstanding Performance by an Ensemble in a Telemovie/Mini-Serie	Won	
Film Critics Circle of Australia	1987	The More Things Change	Best Director	Won	
Fright Meter Awards	2020	Relic	Best Supporting Actress	Nominated	
Logie Awards	1965	Herself	Tasmania: Most Popular Female	Won	
Logie Awards	1967	Herself	Tasmania: Most Popular Female	Won	
Logie Awards	1981	Water Under the Bridge	Best Lead Actress in a Single Drama or Mini Series	Won	
Penguin Award	1981	Water Under the Bridge	Best Actress	Won	
Sammy Awards	1981	Water Under the Bridge	Best Actress in a Television Movie	Won	
Sammy Awards	1981	Water Under the Bridge	Best Actress in a Television Series/Miniseries	Won	

=== Theatre awards ===
Association	Year	Work	Category	Result	Ref.
Australian National Theatre Award	1976	Herself	Best Actress New South Wales	Won	
Green Room Award	1995	Scenes from A Separation	Best Director	Nominated	
Green Room Award	1996	Julius Caesar	Best Actress in a Leading Role	Nominated	
Green Room Award	1999	Long Day's Journey into Night	Best Actress in a Leading Role	Nominated	
Green Room Award	2008	The Women of Troy	Best Female Performer	Nominated	
Green Room Award	2009	August: Osage Country	Best Female Performer	Won	
Helpmann Award	2005	Hedda Gabler	Best Direction of a Play	Nominated	
Helpmann Award	2009	The Women of Troy	Best Female Actor in a Play	Won	
Helpmann Award	2010	August: Osage Country	Best Female Actor in a Play	Nominated	
Helpmann Award	2012	Summer of the Seventeenth Doll	Best Female Actor in a Play	Won	
Helpmann Award	2014	Angels in America	Best Female Actor in a Supporting Role in a Play	Won	
Helpmann Award	2015	Suddenly Last Summer	Best Female Actor in a Play	Nominated	
Helpmann Award	2017	My Fair Lady	Best Female Actor in a Supporting Role in a Musical	Won	
Helpmann Award	2017	Herself	JC Williamson Lifetime Achievement	Won	
Queensland Matilda Award	1997	Herself	Outstanding Contribution to Queensland Theatre	Won	
Sydney Critics Circle Award	1987	Herself	Outstanding Achievement in Theatre	Won	
Sydney Critics Circle Award	1991	Diving for Pearls	Best Actress in a Leading Role	Won	
Sydney Critics Circle Award	1992	Aristophanes Frog	Best Actress in a Supporting Role	Won	
Sidney Myer Performing Arts Awards	1998	Herself	Outstanding Individual Award	Won	
Sydney Theatre Awards	2006	Summer Rain	Best Direction in a Musical	Won	
Sydney Theatre Awards	2011	Neighbourhood watch	Best Leading Actress of a Mainstage Production	Nominated	
Variety Club Heart Award	1998	Herself	Stage Award	Won	

== Personal life ==
Nevin has been married twice, most notably in her second marriage to "prison playwright" Jim McNeil (1975–1977). She currently lives with her partner, US-born actor and screenwriter Nicholas Hammond. They met when they starred in Alan Ayckbourn's Woman in Mind at the STC in 1987. From her first marriage to Barry Crook, she has a daughter Emily Russell (born 1968) who is also an actress.
