= Arthur Dignam =

Australian actor (1939–2020)

- Born: 9 September 1939; Lord Howe Island, New South Wales, Australia
- Died: 9 May 2020 (aged 80); Sydney, Australia
- Education: Newington College; University of Sydney
- Occupation: Actor
- Children: Nicholas Gledhill

Arthur Dignam (9 September 1939 – 9 May 2020) was an Australian actor.

== Early life ==
Dignam was born on Lord Howe Island. He attended Newington College in Sydney as a boarder in 1955 and 1956 and then the University of Sydney.

== Career ==
He was best known for one of his early roles, that of Brother Francine in Fred Schepisi's The Devil's Playground (1976). While he worked mainly in film and television, he also worked in theatre, including musical theatre. He played Pontius Pilate in the Australian production of Jesus Christ Superstar in 1972–73, and appears on the original Australian cast recording.

During 1980, Dignam was part of A Shakespeare Company, funded by a one-off grant from the Australia Council, and worked with actors Ruth Cracknell, Ron Haddrick and others on two texts for six months and then presented them at the Seymour Centre.

== Personal life ==
His son together with Bobbie Gledhill – actor Nicholas Gledhill was born in Sydney in 1975.

== Death ==
Dignam died of a heart attack on 9 May 2020, in Sydney at the age of 80.

== Theatre ==
=== As actor ===
Year	Title	Role	Venue / Company
1961	'Tis Pity She's a Whore		University of Sydney
1962	The Dumb Waiter and A Slight Ache	Gus / Edward	Old Dolphin Theatre, Perth & University of Sydney
1962	Coriolanus		University of Sydney
1963	Romeo and Juliet	Romeo	University of Sydney
1966	The Royal Hunt of the Sun		University of Adelaide
1968	War and Peace		New Theatre, Sydney with Melbourne Theatre Company
1969	Rosencrantz and Guildenstern Are Dead	Guildenstern	Octagon Theatre, Perth
1969	The Man of Mode		Octagon Theatre, Perth
1970	The Pope's Wedding		Old Dolphin Theatre, Perth
1970	You Can't Take It with You		Hole in the Wall Theatre, Perth
1970	The Haunted House / Black Comedy	Callidamates / Brindsley Miller	Octagon Theatre, Perth
1970	Twelfth Night, or What You Will	Orsino	Octagon Theatre, Perth
1970	Othello	Cassio	Octagon Theatre, Perth
1970	Brecht on Brecht		Old Dolphin Theatre, Perth
1970	The Seagull		Octagon Theatre, Perth
1970	Hadrian the Seventh		Octagon Theatre, Perth
1970	Narrow Road to the Deep North		Old Dolphin Theatre, Perth
1970	What the Butler Saw		Playhouse Theatre, Perth
1971	The Recruiting Officer		Southern Highlands Festival Theatre
1971	Doctor Faustus		Southern Highlands Festival Theatre
1971	Macbeth		Nimrod Street Theatre
1971	An Evening of Victorian Music Hall		Paddington Town Hall with Nimrod Theatre Company
1972	Trelawny of the 'Wells'		UNSW with Old Tote Theatre
1972	The Good Man of Setzuan		UNSW with Old Tote Theatre
1972	Jesus Christ Superstar	Pontius Pilate	Capitol Theatre, Sydney
1972	Julius Caesar		UNSW with Old Tote Theatre
1973	Hamlet		Nimrod Street Theatre & Playhouse, Canberra
1973	Kabul		UNSW with Old Tote Theatre
1973	The Threepenny Opera		Sydney Opera House with Old Tote Theatre
1974	Antony and Cleopatra	Antony	New Fortune Theatre for Perth Festival
1974	The Rocky Horror Show	Narrator	New Art Cinema, Sydney
1975	Berenice		Sydney Opera House with Old Tote Theatre
1975	Scapin		Sydney Opera House with Old Tote Theatre
1975	Waiting for Godot		Octagon Theatre, Perth
1975	Joseph and the Amazing Technicolor Dreamcoat	Potiphar / Simeon	Seymour Centre
1976	T.Zee	The Beast	Royal Court Theatre, London
1977	Big Toys	Ritchie Bousanquet	UNSW, Comedy Theatre, Melbourne & Canberra Theatre with Old Tote Theatre
1977–78	Ned Kelly	Superintendent Hare	Adelaide Festival Centre & Her Majesty's Theatre, Sydney
1978	Pandora's Cross	The Goose	Paris Theatre, Sydney
1979	The Lady of the Camellias	Baron de Varville	Sydney Opera House with Sydney Theatre Company
1979	Hedda Gabler	Judge Brack	SGIO Theatre with QTC (left before opening night)
1979	Life of Galileo	Cardinal Barberini	Nimrod Upstairs
1980	The Two Gentlemen of Verona	Launce / Lucetta / Host / Outlaw	Seymour Centre
1980	Measure for Measure	Duke of Vienna	Seymour Centre
1986	Hedda Gabler		Wharf Theatre with Sydney Theatre Company
1993	Mesmerized		Stables Theatre
1993–94	The Temple	Sir Thomas Burchett / Henry / Freddie Arrow	Wharf Theatre with Sydney Theatre Company
1994	The Crucible	Judge Hathorn	His Majesty's Theatre, Perth, Riverside Theatres Parramatta, Monash University
1994	Sixteen Words for Water		Subiaco Theatre Centre
1997	The Governor's Family		Belvoir St Theatre
2005	Julius Caesar	Julius Caesar	Wharf Theatre, Sydney with Sydney Theatre Company
2008	The Women of Troy	Menelaus	Wharf Theatre, Sydney with Sydney Theatre Company & Merlyn Theatre

=== As producer ===
Year	Title	Role	Venue / Company
1964	Victimes du Devoir	Producer	University of Melbourne

== Filmography ==
=== Film ===
Year	Title	Role	Type
1962	Lend Me Your Stable		
1973	Libido	Father Burn	Feature film, segment: The Priest
1974	Petersen	Prof. Charles Kent	Feature film
1974	Between Wars	Peter Avante	Feature film Oz Movies
1976	The Devil's Playground	Brother Francine	Feature film
1976	Summer of Secrets	Doctor Beverley Adams	Feature film
1977	The Duellists	Captain with Eyepatch	Feature film
1978	The Chant of Jimmie Blacksmith	Man in Butcher Shop	Feature film
1979	Cathy's Child	Minister	Feature film
1981	Grendel Grendel Grendel	The Dragon / Beowulf (voice)	Animated film
1981	Strange Behavior	Dr. Le Sange / Nagel	Feature film
1982	Duet for Four	Doug Quincey	Feature film
1982	We of the Never Never	Aeneas Gunn	Feature film
1983	The Return of Captain Invincible	Lawyer	Feature film
1983	The Wild Duck	Gregory	Feature film
1984	The Schippan Mystery	Sir Josiah Symon	TV film
1985	Burke & Wills	Sir William Stawell	Feature film
1986	Comrades	Fop	Feature film
1987	The Right Hand Man	Dr. Redbridge	Feature film
1987	Those Dear Departed (aka Ghosts Can Do It!)	Producer	Feature film
1988	The Everlasting Secret Family	The Senator	Feature film
1988	The Dreaming	Professor Bernard Thornton	Feature film
1991	Isabelle Eberhardt	Cauvet	Feature film
1993	The Nostradamus Kid	Pastor Anderson	Feature film
1996	Dating the Enemy	Dr. Kamins	Feature film
1997	Paradise Road	Mr. Pike	Feature film
1997	Oscar and Lucinda		Feature film
1998	Gods and Monsters	Ernest Thesiger (uncredited)	Feature film
2001	Moulin Rouge!	Christian's Father	Feature film
2002	Beneath Clouds	Old Man in pub / Mercedes driver	Feature film
2006	The Libertine	Man	Short film
2008	Australia	Father Benedict	Feature film
2010	The Tree	Uncle Jack	Feature film
2013	The Great Gatsby	Uncredited	Feature film
2017	7 from Etheria	Old Kurt Gödel	Anthology film (segment: "Gödel Incomplete")

=== Television ===
Year	Title	Role	Type
1976	The New Avengers	Dr Graham	TV series, 1 episode
1979	Water Under the Bridge	Maynard Dickens	TV miniseries, 2 episodes
1981	Tickled Pink		TV series
1983	The Dismissal	Eric Robinson	TV miniseries, 2 episodes
1984	Five Mile Creek	Arthur Archer	TV series
1984	Special Squad	Grayson	TV series, 1 episode
1984	Bodyline	Mr Jardine (Douglas Jardine's father)	TV miniseries
1987	The Storyteller: Greek Myths	King Acrisius	TV series, episode: Perseus and the Gorgon
1989	Shadow of the Cobra	Gupta	TV miniseries, 2 episodes
1989	Edens Lost	Heath	TV miniseries
1992	The Flying Doctors	Royce Phelan DC	TV series, 1 episode
1993	Minder	Geoffrey Evans	TV series, 1 episode
1994–95	Escape from Jupiter	Professor Ingosol	TV series, 13 episodes
1996	Pacific Drive	Marcus (theatrical agent)	TV series
1996	Heartbreak High	Athol Pike	TV series, 1 episode
2001	All Saints	Father Francis Tyler	TV series, 1 episode
2023	Faraway Downs	Father Benedict	TV miniseries, 1 episode
