= Clytie Jessop =

Actor, film director, artist and gallerist (1929–2017)

Clytie Jessop (born Clytie Erica Lloyd-Jones; 1929 – 9 April 2017) was a British-based Australian actress, gallerist, painter, screenwriter and film director, notable mainly for her association with cinematographer and film director Freddie Francis.

== Biography ==
Born to Herman Jonah and Erica Lily (née Small) Lloyd-Jones in Sydney, New South Wales, Jessop's younger sister, Hermia Sappho Lloyd-Jones (1931–2000), married artist David Boyd. She married her first husband, antiques dealer Peter Jessop, in London in 1952, and together they adopted a daughter, Pandora, Clytie's only child.

Living in New York in the late 1950s, she worked as an actor in off-Broadway productions. Her first screen role was as the ghost of Miss Jessel in The Innocents (1961), based on Henry James's The Turn of the Screw and starring Deborah Kerr. She appeared only in long shot. Freddie Francis was the cinematographer for The Innocents; he later directed Jessop in two minor horror roles for Hammer and Amicus, respectively: Nightmare (1964) and Torture Garden (1967).

Jessop later owned and ran the eponymous Clytie Jessop Gallery on Kings Road, Chelsea, London, during the 1960s. Following the arrest on obscenity charges of OZ magazine's Richard Neville and Jim Anderson in 1971, she held a benefit exhibition called Ozjects D'Art featuring works by David Hockney among others. In 1969, she married Australian writer Peter Smalley, author of a series of historic naval novels about HMS Expedient. In 1986, she wrote, directed and produced the film Emma's War, starring Lee Remick.

== Filmography ==
Year	Title	Role	Notes
1961	The Innocents	Miss Jessel	
1964	Nightmare	Woman in White	
1967	Torture Garden	Atropos – Goddess of Destiny	(final film role)
