= Manson, Iowa =

City in Calhoun County, Iowa, United States

- City
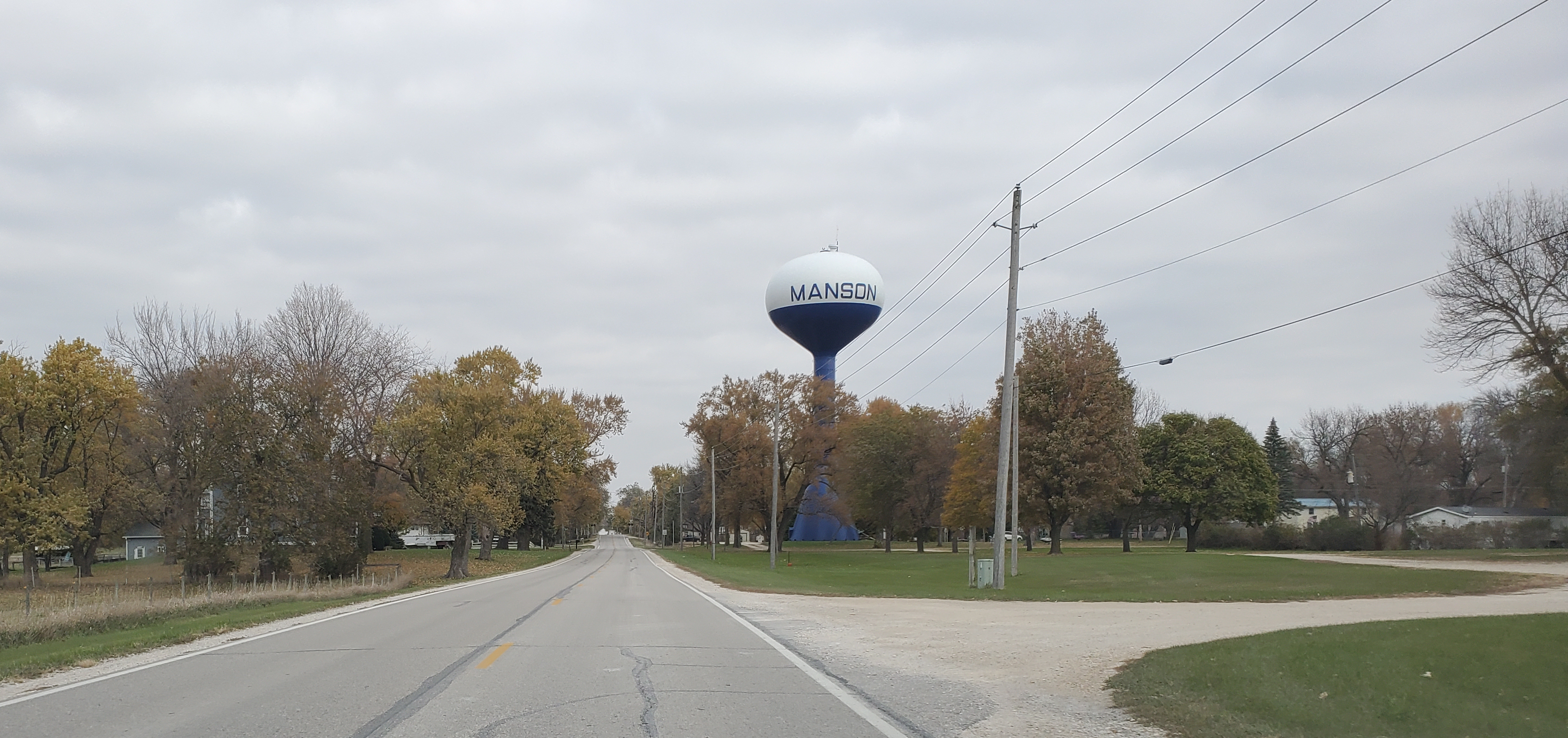
- The water tower in Watertower Park

- Location of Manson, Iowa
- Coordinates: 42°31′43″N 94°32′24″W
- Country: US
- State: Iowa
- County: Calhoun

Area
  - Total: 3.24 sq mi (8.40 km^{2})
  - Land: 3.24 sq mi (8.40 km^{2})
  - Water: 0 sq mi (0.00 km^{2})
- Elevation: 1,227 ft (374 m)

Population (2020)
  - Total: 1,709
  - Density: 527.2/sq mi (203.56/km^{2})
- Time zone: UTC-6 (Central (CST))
  - Summer (DST): UTC-5 (CDT)
- ZIP code: 50563
- Area code: 712
- FIPS code: 19-48990
- GNIS feature ID: 2395835
- Website: mansoniowa.com

Manson is a city in Calhoun County, Iowa, United States. The population was 1,709 at the time of the 2020 census.

== History ==
Manson was platted in 1872 on the Dubuque and Sioux City Railroad line.

=== Tornado of June 28, 1979 ===
A destructive F4 tornado killed three people and destroyed a large part of Manson on June 28, 1979, at about 7:45 PM. The tornado slowly chewed its way from northwest to southeast through Manson. The tornado was on the southwest side of a large southeast-moving thunderstorm complex; thus, it was surrounded on three sides by clear skies (in fact, the sun was shining) and was highly visible. The business district was hit hard, with 25 out of 35 businesses either destroyed or severely damaged. The middle school was also destroyed, along with approximately 110 homes. An additional 139 homes were damaged General Telephone Company exchange building for Manson was completely destroyed - the first time this had ever happened in Iowa. It was reported that the storm was like a lawn mower going through the city, and afterwards one could see from one end of the city to the other when looking up the damage track.

There was about 30 minutes warning and the tornado sirens were sounded well before the arrival of the tornado. The fact that it was still daylight also contributed to the relatively low death count from this destructive storm.

== Geography ==
According to the United States Census Bureau, the city has a total area of 3.18 square miles (8.24 km^{2}), all land.

=== Manson impact crater ===
Manson is located near the site of the Manson crater, formed by a meteorite collision that happened 74 million years ago. The crater's existence was first discovered during an oil-drilling wildcatting expedition in the 1930s. At one time, it was thought to be the biggest impact by an object from outer space in North America, until subsequent studies revealed larger examples. The impact event was also once theorized to have led to the extinction of the dinosaurs, or contributed to it as a fragment of the Chicxulub meteor, until tests by the U.S. Geological Survey in 1991 and 1992 proved that it was too old by 9 million years.

Not much remains due to glacial till which has filled in the crater and has made it undetectable at ground level. However, due to this infilling it is one of the best preserved impact sites on Earth.

The impact crater measures approximately 24 miles (39 km) in diameter and the city of Manson is located near the center of the impact site.

== Demographics ==
Historical populations
Year	Pop.	±%
1880	377	—
1890	822	+118.0%
1900	1,424	+73.2%
1910	1,236	−13.2%
1920	1,409	+14.0%
1930	1,382	−1.9%
1940	1,429	+3.4%
1950	1,622	+13.5%
1960	1,789	+10.3%
1970	1,993	+11.4%
1980	1,924	−3.5%
1990	1,844	−4.2%
2000	1,893	+2.7%
2010	1,690	−10.7%
2020	1,709	+1.1%
Source:"U.S. Census website". United States Census Bureau. and Iowa Data Center; Source: U.S. Decennial Census

=== 2020 census ===
As of the 2020 census, Manson had a population of 1,709, with 773 households and 454 families. The median age was 43.1 years. 23.4% of residents were under the age of 18 and 22.7% were 65 years of age or older. For every 100 females, there were 98.5 males, and for every 100 females age 18 and over, there were 93.6 males.

The population density was 527.2 inhabitants per square mile (203.6/km^{2}). There were 857 housing units at an average density of 264.4 per square mile (102.1/km^{2}). Of all housing units, 9.8% were vacant. The homeowner vacancy rate was 1.4% and the rental vacancy rate was 15.1%.

There were 773 households, of which 27.3% had children under the age of 18 living in them. Of all households, 45.5% were married-couple households, 6.5% were cohabiting couple households, 19.9% were households with a male householder and no spouse or partner present, and 28.1% were households with a female householder and no spouse or partner present. About 41.3% were non-family households, 36.8% of all households were made up of individuals, and 18.2% had someone living alone who was 65 years of age or older.

0.0% of residents lived in urban areas, while 100.0% lived in rural areas.

Racial composition as of the 2020 census
Race	Number	Percent
White	1,656	96.9%
Black or African American	8	0.5%
American Indian and Alaska Native	3	0.2%
Asian	6	0.4%
Native Hawaiian and Other Pacific Islander	0	0.0%
Some other race	8	0.5%
Two or more races	28	1.6%
Hispanic or Latino (of any race)	39	2.3%

=== 2010 census ===
At the 2010 census there were 1,690 people, 771 households, and 483 families living in the city. The population density was 531.4 inhabitants per square mile (205.2/km^{2}). There were 860 housing units at an average density of 270.4 per square mile (104.4/km^{2}). The racial makup of the city was 99.2% White, 0.2% Native American, 0.2% from other races, and 0.4% from two or more races. Hispanic or Latino of any race were 0.8%.

Of the 771 households 25.6% had children under the age of 18 living with them, 50.2% were married couples living together, 9.3% had a female householder with no husband present, 3.1% had a male householder with no wife present, and 37.4% were non-families. 34.6% of households were one person and 19.7% were one person aged 65 or older. The average household size was 2.14 and the average family size was 2.73.

The median age was 47.2 years. 20.5% of residents were under the age of 18; 6.8% were between the ages of 18 and 24; 19.8% were from 25 to 44; 27.1% were from 45 to 64; and 25.9% were 65 or older. The gender makeup of the city was 47.0% male and 53.0% female.

=== 2000 census ===
At the 2000 census there were 1,893 people, 814 households, and 529 families living in the city. The population density was 592.8 inhabitants per square mile (228.9/km^{2}). There were 863 housing units at an average density of 270.2 per square mile (104.3/km^{2}). The racial makup of the city was 98.68% White, 0.16% African American, 0.21% Native American, 0.32% Asian, 0.32% from other races, and 0.32% from two or more races. Hispanic or Latino of any race were 0.37%.

Of the 814 households 27.4% had children under the age of 18 living with them, 53.8% were married couples living together, 8.7% had a female householder with no husband present, and 34.9% were non-families. 32.7% of households were one person and 21.0% were one person aged 65 or older. The average household size was about 2.27 and the average family size was approximately 2.87.

The age distribution was 23.7% under the age of 18, 6.9% from 18 to 24, 22.5% from 25 to 44, 21.4% from 45 to 64, and 25.4% 65 or older. The median age was 44 years. For every 100 females, there were 86.0 males. For every 100 females age 18 and over, there were 79.8 males.

The median household income was $31,331 and the median family income was $41,500. Males had a median income of $31,006 versus $20,491 for females. The per capita income for the city was $16,687. About 6.7% of families and 8.9% of the population were below the poverty line, including 11.9% of those under age 18 and 7.7% of those age 65 or over.

== Education ==
The Manson–Northwest Webster Community School District also known as the "Manson Coy's" serves the community. It was established on July 1, 1993, with the merger of the Manson and Northwest Webster districts. The schools are:

- Manson–Northwest Webster Elementary School, Barnum
- Manson–Northwest Webster High School, Manson
