= The Persuaders =

The Persuaders can refer to:

- The Persuaders!, a 1970s TV series starring Roger Moore and Tony Curtis
- The Persuaders (R&B group), a 1970s soul music band
- The Persuaders, a 1990s garage rock band fronted by King Louie Bankston
- The Persuaders: At the Front Lines of the Fight for Hearts, Minds, and Democracy, 2022 book by Anand Giridharadas
