= Peter Smalley =

Australian-born author (born 1943)

Peter Smalley (born 1943 in Melbourne, Victoria) is an Australian-born author, screenwriter and broadcaster who lives in the United Kingdom, who has written a series of naval thrillers featuring Captain William Rennie. His first Rennie adventure HMS Expedient was published by Century, an imprint of Random House in 2005. His screenwriting credits include Dead-End Drive In (1986), The Return of Captain Invincible (1984) and Chopper Squad (1978–1979). Following a career in advertising he became a screenwriter, broadcaster, and novelist. Smalley is from a seafaring family, and lives in London. His wife, Clytie Jessop, died in 2017.

== Bibliography ==
- A WARM GUN (1972)
- HMS Expedient (2005)
- Port Royal (2006)
- Barbary Coast (2007)
- The Hawk (2008)
- The Gathering Storm (2009)
- The Pursuit (2010)

== Screenwriting ==
- Dead-End Drive In (1986)
- Emma's War (1986)
- The Wild Duck (1984)
- The Return of Captain Invincible (1984)
- Chopper Squad (1978–1979)
- Centre Play (1976)
