= Ray Cook =

Australian composer

- Born: Raymond Frank Cook; December 30, 1936; Adelaide, Australia
- Died: March 20, 1989 (aged 52) London, United Kingdom
- Genres: Film score, Musical theatre
- Occupations: Composer, conductor, arranger, musical director

Ray Cook (December 30, 1936 – March 20, 1989) was an Australian composer, conductor and arranger. Born in Adelaide, he moved to the United Kingdom in 1960, where he died in London.

His first employment was as a pianist for the Phillip Street Revue in Sydney, working with major artists. In the United Kingdom his talents as a musical director came to the fore, and he had a notable career in musical theatre in London's West End.

He composed scores for Australian film and television including Silent Reach (1983), Careful, He Might Hear You (1983), and Rebel (1985). Careful, He Might Hear You won Best Film at the 1983 Australian Film Institute (AFI) Awards (now known as AACTA Awards).

== Awards and nominations ==
=== AFI Awards ===
The Australian Film Institute (AFI) Awards (now known as AACTA Awards) are presented annually by the Australian Academy of Cinema and Television Arts.

Year	Film	Category	Result	Ref.
1983	Careful, He Might Hear You	Best Original Music Score	Nominated	
1985	Rebel	Best Original Music Score	Won	
