= She's a Rebel =

Studio album by Debra Byrne
- Released: November 1974
- Studios: Festival's Studio 24, Sydney, Australia
- Genre: Pop music
- Length: 37:33
- Labels: L&Y Records, Festival Records
- Producer: John Young

Debbie Byrne albums chronology
She's a Rebel (1974)	The Persuader (1985)

Singles from She's a Rebel
- 1. "He's a Rebel / I am Woman" Released: March 1974; 2. "Boogie Man / Da Doo Ron Ron" Released: October 1974; 3. "How Can I Tell You / Byrning" Released: April 1975; 4. "Dirty Ol' Man / Ain't No Sunshine" Released: June 1976

She's a Rebel is the debut studio album by Australian recording artist Debbie Byrne. The album was released in November 1974 and peaked at number 63 on the Kent Music Report.

== Track listing ==
LP/Cassette

Side A
No.	Title	Writer(s)	Length
1.	"Boogie Man"	Deke Richards	3:13
2.	"Space Captain"	Matthew Moore	3:12
3.	"Dirty Ol' Man"	Gamble and Huff	3:03
4.	"How Can I Tell You"	Cat Stevens	3:03
5.	"Take Me to the Pilot"	Elton John, Bernie Taupin	3:50
6.	"He's a Rebel"	Gene Pitney	2:28

Side B
No.	Title	Writer(s)	Length
1.	"Da Doo Ron Ron"	Jeff Barry, Ellie Greenwich, Phil Spector	2:41
2.	"Byrning"	Johnny Young	2:58
3.	"Ain't No Sunshine"	Bill Withers	2:47
4.	"Super Cool"	Elton John, Bernie Taupin	3:18
5.	"She's Leaving Home"	Lennon–McCartney	4:42
6.	"I Am Woman"	Helen Reddy, Ray Burton	3:18

== Charts ==
Chart (1975)	Peak position
Australian Kent Music Report Albums Chart	63
