= Careful, He Might Hear You (film) =

- DVD artwork.
- Directed by: Carl Schultz
- Screenplay by: Michael Jenkins
- Based on: Careful, He Might Hear You (novel) by Sumner Locke Elliott
- Produced by: Jill Robb
- Starring: Wendy Hughes; Robyn Nevin; Nicholas Gledhill
- Cinematography: John Seale
- Edited by: Richard Francis-Bruce
- Music by: Ray Cook
- Production company: Syme International
- Distributed by: 20th Century Fox (US)
- Release date: 1983
- Running time: 110 minutes
- Country: Australia
- Language: English
- Budget: A$2.2 million
- Box office: $2,431,126 (Australia)

Careful, He Might Hear You is a 1983 Australian drama film. It is based on the 1963 novel of the same name by Australian-American author Sumner Locke Elliott. It won eight awards, including Best Film and Best Direction, at the 1983 Australian Film Institute (AFI) Awards (now known as AACTA Awards).

== Plot ==
The film stars Wendy Hughes and Robyn Nevin as two sisters who are locked in a custody battle over their young nephew, PS, played by Nicholas Gledhill. PS has been raised by his aunt Lila (Nevin) and her husband George since his mother died soon after his birth. When Lila's richer sister Vanessa (Hughes) returns from overseas, she seeks custody of PS, citing the opportunities she can give him.

== Cast ==
- Wendy Hughes as Vanessa
- Robyn Nevin as Lila
- Nicholas Gledhill as PS
- Michael Long as Mr Hood
- John Hargreaves as Logan
- Geraldine Turner as Vere
- Julie Nihill as Diana
- Peter Whitford as George

== Production ==
There had long been interest in making a film out of the novel. In the 1960s it was announced that Joshua Logan would direct a movie version starring Elizabeth Taylor but this did not come to pass. Film rights to the novel were bought by Jill Robb who hired Mike Jenkins to adapt the screenplay and Carl Schultz to direct. Funding was obtained from the New South Wales Film Corporation among others.

After an extensive search, Nicholas Gledhill, son of actor Arthur Dignam was cast as PS.

The film was shot in and around Sydney, mostly in Neutral Bay and Darling Point. The Hordern Family garden and mansion, Babworth House, in Darling Point was used in filming.

== Box office ==
Careful, He Might Hear You grossed $2,431,126 at the box office in Australia. The movie also enjoyed a successful release in North America.

== Home media ==
A Collector's Edition of Careful, He Might Hear You was released on DVD with a new print by Umbrella Entertainment in June 2008. The DVD is compatible with all regional codes and includes special features such as the film trailer, bonus trailers, a still photo gallery, an interview with Sumner Locke Elliot and interviews with stars Wendy Hughes, Nicholas Gledhill and Jill Robb.

A regular edition of the film with reduced special features was released on DVD by Umbrella Entertainment in October 2008.

== Accolades ==
| Award | Category | Subject | Result |
|---|---|---|---|
| AACTA Awards (1983 AFI Awards) | Best Film | Jill Robb | Won |
| AACTA Awards (1983 AFI Awards) | Best Direction | Carl Schultz | Won |
| AACTA Awards (1983 AFI Awards) | Best Adapted Screenplay | Michael Jenkins | Won |
| AACTA Awards (1983 AFI Awards) | Best Actor | Nicholas Gledhill | Nominated |
| AACTA Awards (1983 AFI Awards) | Best Actress | Wendy Hughes | Won |
| AACTA Awards (1983 AFI Awards) | Best Supporting Actor | John Hargreaves | Won |
| AACTA Awards (1983 AFI Awards) | Best Supporting Actress | Robyn Nevin | Nominated |
| AACTA Awards (1983 AFI Awards) | Best Cinematography | John Seale | Won |
| AACTA Awards (1983 AFI Awards) | Best Editing | Richard Francis-Bruce | Nominated |
| AACTA Awards (1983 AFI Awards) | Best Original Music Score | Ray Cook | Nominated |
| AACTA Awards (1983 AFI Awards) | Best Sound | Syd Butterfield | Nominated |
| AACTA Awards (1983 AFI Awards) | Best Sound | Julian Ellingworth | Nominated |
| AACTA Awards (1983 AFI Awards) | Best Sound | Roger Savage | Nominated |
| AACTA Awards (1983 AFI Awards) | Best Sound | Andrew Steuart | Nominated |
| AACTA Awards (1983 AFI Awards) | Best Production Design | John Stoddart | Won |
| AACTA Awards (1983 AFI Awards) | Best Costume Design | Bruce Finlayson | Won |
| AWGIE Award | Best Writing in a Feature Film – Adapted | Michael Jenkins | Won |
| National Board of Review, USA | Top Ten Films | | Won |
| Venice Film Festival | Golden Lion | Carl Schultz | Nominated |

== See also ==
- Cinema of Australia
