= Debra Byrne =

Australian entertainer

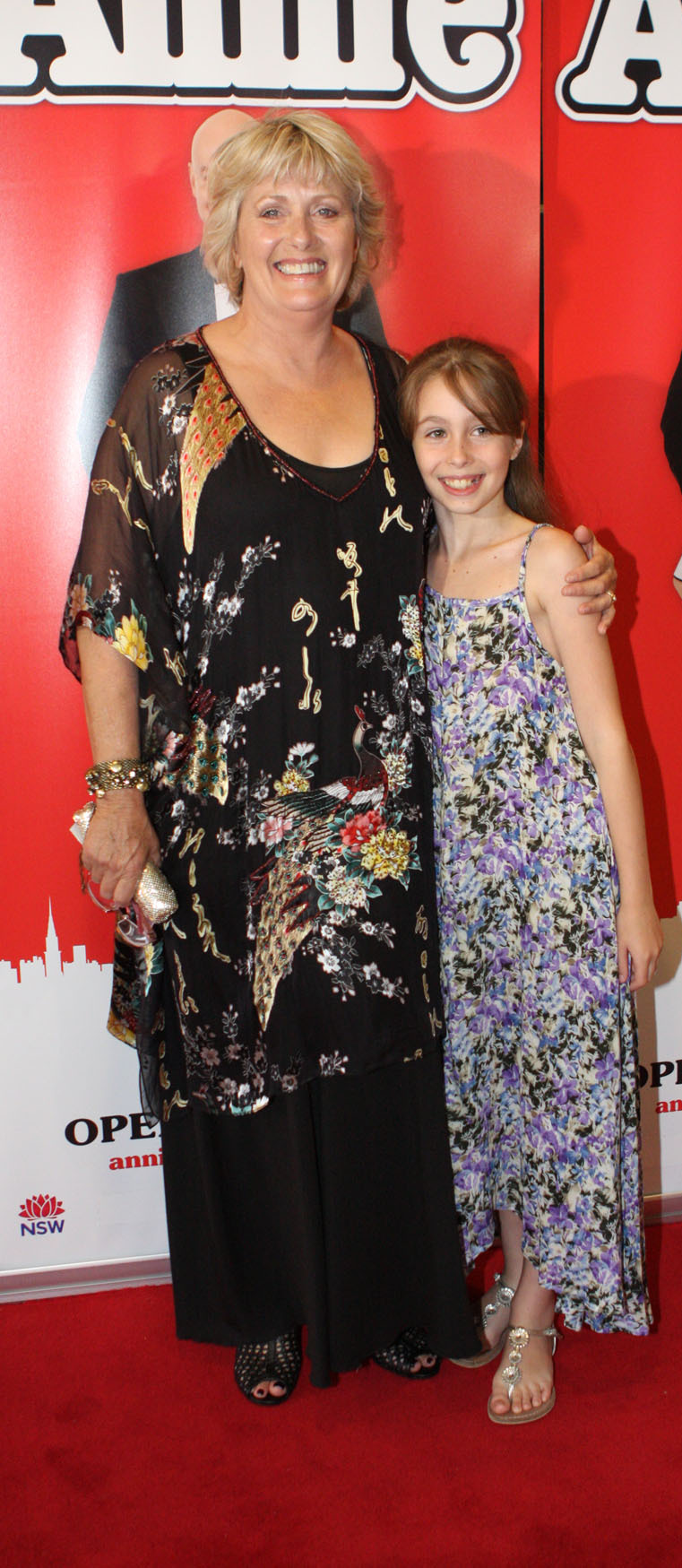
- Debra with her daughter Lucille in 2012
- Born: Debra Anne Byrne; 30 March 1957 (age 69); Melbourne, Victoria, Australia
- Occupations: actress; singer; producer; variety entertainer; writer; choreographer
- Years active: 1969-present
- Spouses: David Dudley (m. 1977 – d. 1980); Neil Melville (m. 1989 – d. 1997)
- Partner: Ced Le Meledo (c. 1999–2006)
- Children: 3 (including Lucille Le Meledo)

Debra Anne Byrne (born 30 March 1957), formerly billed as Debbie Byrne, is an Australian pop singer, variety entertainer, theatre and TV actress and writer, director and choreographer of cabaret. From April 1971 to March 1975 she was a founding cast member of Young Talent Time. She started her solo singing career with a cover version of "He's a Rebel" (March 1974), which peaked at number 25 on the Go-Set Australian Singles chart. At the Logie Awards of 1974 she won Best Teenage Personality and followed with the Queen of Pop Award in October – both ceremonies were sponsored by TV Week. She repeated both wins in the following year.

As a stage actress Byrne appeared in the Australian musical theatre versions of Cats (July 1985 to mid-1987), Les Misérables (November 1987 to May 1988, December 1989 to June 1990) and Sunset Boulevard (October 1996 to June 1997). Her solo album, Caught in the Act (April 1991), peaked at number 2 on the ARIA Albums Chart and was certified gold. In 2006 Byrne published her autobiography, Not Quite Ripe: A Memoir.

== Career ==
=== Early career as pop singer ===
In 1969 Debra 'Debbie' Byrne made her television debut on Brian and the Juniors, a children's variety and talent show, hosted by newsreader Brian Naylor. She stayed with the show for 12 months until it finished in late 1970. In April 1971, she became an original cast member on Young Talent Time, another children's talent show, hosted by Johnny Young. Byrne proved to be a popular cast member: in March 1974 she won the Logie Award for Best Teenage Personality and the TV Week Queen of Pop Award in October.

In March 1974, before leaving the Young Talent Time regular cast, Byrne released her first solo single, "He's a Rebel", a cover version of the Phil Spector-produced 1962 hit by the Crystals. It peaked at number 25 on the Go-Set Top 40 Australian Singles chart, and reached number 1 on the Melbourne charts. Her debut album, She's a Rebel (1974), was produced by Young, with session musicians including Russell Dunlop on drums (ex-Aesops Fables, SCRA, Renée Geyer and Mother Earth, Johnny Rocco Band), Tim Partridge on bass guitar (Company Caine, Mighty Kong, Kevin Borich Express), Mark Punch on guitar (Johnny Rocco Band, Renée Geyer Band) and Terry Walker on guitar and backing vocals (the Strangers, Pastoral Symphony).

Byrne's follow-up single was a second Crystals cover, "Da Doo Ron Ron" (January 1975), backed by the track, "Boogie Man". In that year she won both the Logie Award for Best Teenage Personality and the TV Week Queen of Pop Award for a second time. In September 1975 Byrne travelled to London to record at Abbey Road Studios with Cliff Richard producing. While in London, she made public and TV appearances, including on The Cliff Richard Show.

Byrne's first Australian television guest appearance as a featured solo artist was on The Graham Kennedy Show at the age of fifteen. Since then she has made a guest appearance on every major Australian Tonight show and was a regular performer on the Australian Broadcasting Corporation (ABC) series, The Saturday Show. In 1979 she merged singing with acting for the first time on the ABC's TV Follies series. From August 1980 Byrne co-starred alongside John Farnham in their own series, Farnham and Byrne. Craig Walsh of The Australian Women's Weekly previewed a segment for a rock 'n' roll themed episode, "[its] staging promises to make the series the smash hit of 1980, say the producers" with Byrne declaring "I've just discovered I can dance better than I thought."

Byrne's career stalled between 1980 and 1985 due to her heroin addiction, for which she undertook rehab at Odyssey House. A further stumbling block occurred when a sex tape of her and a former partner was stolen and leaked to the media.

In mid-1985, Byrne recorded her second solo album, The Persuader, which was produced by Peter Dawkins. She issued the single "The Persuader" in August, but neither single or album charted. She made a successful and highly publicised career comeback in 1985 with the starring role as Kathy McLeod, opposite Matt Dillon, in the feature film, Rebel. She was nominated for an AFI Award for Best Actress in a Lead Role for the performance. Byrne sang lead vocals on nine of ten tracks on Rebel: Original Motion Picture Soundtrack (1985).

=== Cabaret and concert performances ===
Byrne's live cabaret, Caught in the Act Again, commenced during mid-1999, it included both show tunes and some original material. The first half was "a little too low-key, mostly because the songs all have a similar, slow, acid-jazzy tempo" according to Fiona Scott-Norman of The Age. She was backed by John McAll on piano and Don Hirini as backing vocalist; she also co-wrote some material, including "I Don't Make the Rules", with Hirini. Caught in the Act Again earned a Green Room Award nomination for Best Cabaret Performance and Best Musical Arrangement.

Her cabaret work includes writing, directing, choreographing and starring in Girls, Girls, Girls from May to June 2002. The show also starred Wendy Stapleton and Lisa Edwards (replaced by Nikki Nicholls) as a tribute to the Supremes, Cilla Black, Dusty Springfield, Patsy Cline and Lulu. In 2002 it won the Herald Sun Best Cabaret Award. The shows had sold out before they opened. In subsequent years Byrne, Stapleton and Nicholls periodically resumed Girls, Girls, Girls.

Since 1972 Byrne has been a regular performer at the Christmas Eve Carols by Candlelight concert at Melbourne's Sidney Myer Music Bowl. At the 2005 concert she performed a duet of Silent Night with her five-year-old daughter, Lucille, who was making her professional stage and television debut. In late 2006 her autobiography, Not Quite Ripe: A Memoir, was published on Pan Macmillan. She described how the book took her four years to write, "On and off. I wrote and I didn't write." Byrne reprised her role of Grizabella in the ExitLeft production of Cats, which was staged at the Derwent Entertainment Centre in Hobart in late October 2007.

=== 2009–present: stage and television roles ===
In April 2009 Byrne played the role of Sue Barnes in Metro Street at its world premiere in Adelaide and its subsequent tour to South Korea, with an appearance at the Daegu International Musical Festival (see Daegu) in June.

From 29 July 2010 to April 2011 she played the role of the Bird Woman in the original Australian production of the stage musical, Mary Poppins at Melbourne's Her Majesty's Theatre. She reprised the role in its Sydney run at the Capitol Theatre. From May to June 2012 Byrne played the role of Claire Christie in the Nine Network's Tricky Business.

From February to March 2014 she appeared on a dramatised crime biography, Fat Tony & Co., portraying Judy Moran, wife of Lewis Moran who was part of the Carlton Crew which were involved in the Melbourne gangland killings. Fat Tony & Co. focused on the rise and fall of convicted drug mastermind, Tony Mokbel, and is an offshoot of the first series of Underbelly (2008). Byrne described her portrayal of Moran: "You'd be surprised what I wear as Judy that's from my own wardrobe [...] There's a definite air of the theatrical about her and a lot of what I saw Judy wearing ... I thought she wore some really nice clothes. Everything she wore was so over the top."

In 2016 she took the role of Carlotta Campion in a concert version of Follies at the Melbourne Recital Hall for a limited run of three performances in May. In August she worked with Vika Bull in their Carole King tribute show, Tapestry. In late 2016, Byrne appeared on the third series of ABC comedy, Upper Middle Bogan.

From 2017 through to 2019, Byrne toured with Vika Bull in their Carole King tribute show 'Tapestry'.

In mid 2019, Byrne played the Beggar Woman in a production of Sweeney Todd: The Demon Barber of Fleet Street, opposite Anthony Warlow and Gina Riley.

== Filmography ==
=== Film ===
Year	Title	Role	Note
1971	Caravan Holiday	Herself	as Debbie Byrne
1985	Rebel	Kathy McLeod	as Debbie Byrne

=== Television ===
Year	Title	Role	Note
1979	TV Follies	Jill Johnson / Laura Summers	TV series
1978	Cop Shop	Kerry Clements	TV series, 3 episodes
1987; 1989	Rafferty's Rules	Sally Edwards / Tricia Rogan	TV series, 2 episodes
1991; 1992	Police Rescue	Maria Mellick / Tricia Mellick	TV series, 2 episodes
1992	G.P.	Helen Cartwright	TV series, 1 episode
1992	Home and Away	Julia Bowman	TV series, 44 episodes
1992	The Flying Doctors	Andrea Griffin	TV series, season 9, episode 19: "Yesterday's News"
1993	Law of the Land	Jean Jardine (regular)	TV series
1995	Naked: Stories of Men	Sharon	TV special, 1 episode
1998	State Coroner	Tracy Dabovich	TV series, 1 episode
2002	The Secret Life of Us	Peta	TV series, season 2, 4 episodes
2007	City Homicide	Marijke Sharman	TV series, 1 episode
2011	Mary Poppins: Behind the Scenes	Bird Lady	TV special
2012	Tricky Business	Claire Christie	TV series, 13 episodes
2014	Fat Tony & Co.	Judy Moran	TV miniseries, 6 episodes
2016	Upper Middle Bogan	Susan	TV series, 1 episode
2017	Underbelly Files: Chopper	Judy Moran	TV miniseries, 2 episodes

=== Television (as self) ===
Year	Title	Role	Note
1969	Brian and the Juniors	Regular member	
1971–1975	Young Talent Time	Regular team member	
1978	The Saturday Show	Herself	27 episodes
1980	Farnham and Byrne	Host & performer	9 episodes
1997	Oz Encounters: UFO's in Australia	Voice & writer	TV special
2003	Love is in the Air	Guest	Episode: "She's Leaving Home"

== Stage ==
=== Theatre ===
Year	Title	Role	Notes
1985–1987	Cats	Grizabella	Australian tour
1986	Jerry's Girls	Herself	Australian tour
1987–1990	Les Misérables	Fantine	Australian tour
1995	Hot Shoe Shuffle	April	Australian tour
1996–1997	Sunset Boulevard	Norma Desmond	Australian tour
2003	Minefields and Miniskirts	The Nurse	Malthouse Theatre, Melbourne
2006	Thoroughly Modern Millie	Muzzie	Arts Centre Melbourne
2007	Little Me	Belle Portine	Arts Centre Melbourne
2007	Cats	Grizabella	Derwent Entertainment Centre, Hobart
2008	High School Musical	Mrs. Darbus	Derwent Entertainment Centre, Hobart
2008	Follies	Sally Durant Plummer	Arts Centre Melbourne
2009	Metro Street	Sue Barnes	Australian & Asian tour
2010–2012	Mary Poppins	Bird Woman	Australian tour
2016	Follies	Carlotta Campion	Concert version
2019	Sweeney Todd: The Demon Barber of Fleet Street	The Beggar Woman	Australian tour
2023	La Cage Aux Folles	Jacqueline	Australian tour

=== Cabaret ===
Year	Title	Notes	Ref.
2002	Girls, Girls, Girls	With Wendy Stapleton and Nikki Nichols	
2013	Last Man Standing	Arts Centre Melbourne	
2017	Tapestry	With Vika Bull	

== Personal life ==
Debra Anne Byrne was born on 30 March 1957 in Fitzroy to Norman Owen Byrne (born ca. 1928 – 2014) and Verna Alice née Reid (ca. 1930 – 1980). She was the fifth of six children – Lynda (died 2002), Cheryl, Sandra (died 1970), Peter and Robyn. She also has a younger half sister, Rebecca. Her father Norman worked as an engineering foreman; he became violent when drunk. According to Byrne she was sexually abused by her maternal grandfather, Ken Reid, from a young age until 13. In 1993 Byrne dropped the usage of 'Debbie' as her first name.

During her stint in Young Talent Time Byrne had a sexual relationship with 'Michael', an on-set boom-camera operator: she was under-age and he was more than ten years older. She later recalled, "I didn't feel protected at all. The attitude was, 'It's over now, it's finished', but this was personal and embarrassing and humiliating and distressing ... Parents need to be aware that even now, with the best protections in place, there's going to be someone who cares more for the product than the child. No law can change that."

In February 1975, Byrne was hospitalised due to "a nervous collapse brought on by a strenuous touring campaign." Her support slot on a tour for United States singer Gene Pitney was taken up by Samantha Sang. Byrne described how "I was drinking, smoking, barely eating, and spending a lot of time in hotel rooms fighting anxiety and depression."

By October 1978, Byrne was married to David John Dudley (born ca. 1956) and the couple lived in Elwood. In that month, the pair were cleared of drugs charges; Byrne declared that "she knew of some entertainers who had 'come to grief' by being associated with drugs. She had been to one or two parties where drugs were being used but she did not mix with that section of the entertainment industry." Later she recalled meeting Dudley at a party where her "latest boyfriend was an everyday dope smoker and I loved the freedom the drug gave me." They had a daughter together, Arja. Her marriage to Dudley broke up in 1980 and her mother died that same year.

Debra gave birth to her second daughter, Lauren, who was fathered by director Chris Webb.

During 1987 while rehearsing for her role of Fantine in the Australian theatre production of Les Misérables, Byrne met fellow actor, Neil Melville. By June 1989 the couple were planning their wedding. Byrne and Melville separated in November 1996 and later divorced.

Byrne's performances as Norma Desmond on Sunset Boulevard from October 1996 to June 1997 were interrupted by "her frequent and sudden absences from the show [which] were partially blamed for the show's lack of success" despite "great critical notices." She attempted suicide late in 1997 and was being treated by a psychiatrist to feel "more focused and driven than ever before." She was subsequently diagnosed with clinical depression and undertook a course of prescription medication. In March 1998, she told Peter Ford of Playbill that "Nobody ever bothered to investigate if that was my major problem, when finally I had a label for my troubles it was a great relief."

Byrne was the domestic partner of French musician, Ced Le Meledo, with whom she collaborated on the live show, Paris-Melbourne. They had one daughter together, Lucille Le Meledo (b. 12 July 2000). The couple separated in 2006. Her daughter eventually made her theatrical debut in 2011 as the title role in Annie. In that same year, Byrne's autobiography, Not Quite Ripe: A Memoir, was released and described by her publisher as "the real story of her gritty, sometimes perilous existence as she chased her career, became addicted to heroin and finally rehabilitated herself".

As of 2019, Byrne lives in Melbourne with her daughter Lucille and two of her grandsons, of whom she has custody.

== Discography ==
=== Studio albums ===
- She's a Rebel (1974)
- The Persuader (1985)
- Caught in the Act (1991)
- Sleeping Child (1994)
- New Ways to Dream (1997)

=== Cast Recording and Soundtrack Appearances ===
- Cats – Original Australian Cast Recording (1985)
- Rebel – Original Motion Picture Soundtrack (1985)
- Les Miserables – The World Symphonic Recording (1988)
- Mary Poppins – Original Australian Cast Recording (2010)

== Awards and nominations ==
Year	Work	Award	Category	Result	Ref.
1974	Debbie Byrne	Logie Awards	Best Teenage Personality	Won	
1974	Debbie Byrne	The King of Pop Awards	Queen of Pop	Won	
1975	Debbie Byrne	Logie Awards	Best Teenage Personality	Won	
1975	Debbie Byrne	The King of Pop Awards	Queen of Pop	Won	
1985	Rebel	Australian Film Institute Awards	Best Actress in a Lead Role	Won	
1985	Debbie Byrne	Mo Awards	Female Vocal Entertainer of the Year	Won	
1988	Debbie Byrne	Mo Awards	Female Musical Theatre Performer of the Year	Won	
1989	Debbie Byrne	Mo Awards	Female Musical Theatre Performer of the Year	Won	
1991	The World Symphonic Recording of Les Misérables	Grammy Awards	Best Theatre Musical Soundtrack (shared with cast)	Won	
1992	Caught in the Act	ARIA Awards	Best Adult Contemporary Album	Won	
2002	Girls, Girls, Girls	Herald Sun	Best Cabaret Award	Won	
2009	Metro Street	Daegu Musical Awards	Best Actress	Won	
2017	Debra Byrne	Adelaide Cabaret Festival	Cabaret Icon Awards	Won	
	Caught in the Act Again	Green Room Awards	Best Cabaret Performance	Nominated	
	Caught in the Act Again	Green Room Awards	Best Musical Arrangement	Nominated	

== Bibliography ==
- Byrne, Debra (2006), Not Quite Ripe: A Memoir, Macmillan, ISBN 978-1-4050-3765-5
