= The Persuader (album) =

Studio album by Debra Byrne
- Released: 1985
- Recorded: May–June 1985
- Studio: Studios 301, Sydney
- Genre: Pop music
- Length: 41:53
- Label: EMI Music
- Producer: Peter Dawkins

Debbie Byrne albums chronology
She's a Rebel (1974)	The Persuader (1985)	Rebel: Original Motion Picture Soundtrack (1985)

Singles from The Persuader
- 1. "The Persuader" Released: August 1985

The Persuader is the second studio album by Australian recording artist Debbie Byrne. The album was released in 1985 via EMI Music.

== Track listing ==
LP/Cassette

Side A
No.	Title	Writer(s)	Length
1.	"Boulevard Boy"	Carol Parks, Dean Parks	3:37
2.	"That's Entertainment"	Paul Weller	4:27
3.	"Fools Rush in" (featuring Roger Taylor on drums)	Johnny Mercer, Rube Bloom	3:32
4.	"So Sad the Song"	Gerry Goffin, Michael Masser	3:53
5.	"Count Me in"	Herbie Flowers, Sandra Banks	5:14

Side B
No.	Title	Writer(s)	Length
1.	"Memory"	Andrew Lloyd Webber	4:45
2.	"Ain't No Love In The Heart Of The City"	Dan Walsh, Michael Price	3:47
3.	"Haunt You"	Parks, Parks	4:09
4.	"I'm In Love Once Again"	Dexter Wansel	4:49
5.	"The Persuader"	Parks, Parks	3:38
