= Jill Robb =

British Australian film producer (1934–2022)

Jill Robb AM (1934 – 16 January 2022) was an English-born Australian film producer and executive who worked mostly in Australia.

== Early life and education ==
Jill Robb was born in England, United Kingdom in 1934.

== Career ==
Robb began in the film industry as a stand in for Jill Adams on Dust in the Sun (1958).

She was a founding board member of the Australian Film Commission, inaugural CEO of the Victorian Film Corporation (later Film Victoria, then VicScreen) and a member of the Film Victoria board from 1983 to 1989.

Robb served for many years on the board of the Playbox Theatre Company during the difficult years following the 1984 fire. She left at the end of 1989.

== Recognition and honours ==
Robb was made a Member of the Order of Australia in the 2011 Australia Day Honours for "service to the Australian film and television industries as a producer, through executive roles with industry organisations, and as a mentor to emerging filmmakers".

In 2012, Film Victoria established the Screen Leader Awards, "to recognise screen professionals who've shown leadership through their achievements and a commitment to further developing the industry and nurturing talent". These comprised two awards, one of which was the Jill Robb Award for Outstanding Leadership, Achievement and Service to the Victorian Screen Industry. In 2013, the Jill Robb Award was awarded to film editor Jill Bilcock.

== Death ==
Robb died on 16 January 2022, at the age of 87.

== Select credits ==
- The Fourth Wish (1976) – associate producer
- Dawn! (1979) – executive producer
- Careful, He Might Hear You (1983) – producer
- Phoenix (1992–93) (TV series) – executive producer
- Stark (1993) (mini series) – executive producer
- Secrets (1993–94) (TV series) – executive producer
