= Rebel (1985 film) =

- Directed by: Michael Jenkins
- Based on: play No Names, No Pack Drill by Bob Herbert
- Produced by: Phillip Emanuel
- Starring: Matt Dillon; Debra Byrne; Bryan Brown
- Music by: Chris Neal
- Production company: Phillip Emanuel Productions
- Distributed by: Roadshow Entertainment (Australia); Vestron Pictures (United States)
- Release date: 5 December 1985
- Country: Australia
- Language: English
- Budget: A$5 million
- Box office: A$886,769 (Australia)

Rebel is a 1985 Australian musical drama directed by Michael Jenkins and starring Matt Dillon, Debra Byrne, and Bryan Brown. It is set in World War Two.

== Cast ==
- Matt Dillon as Sergeant Harry Rebel
- Debra Byrne as Kathy McLeod
- Bryan Brown as Tiger
- Bill Hunter as Browning
- Ray Barrett as Bubbles
- Julie Nihill as Joycie
- John O'May as Benie
- Kim Deacon as Hazel
- Sheree da Costa as Barbara
- Ned Manning as Private Jones
- Cassandra Delaney as All Girl Band
- Joy Smithers as All Girl Band
- Antoinette Byron as All Girl Band
- Nikki Coghill as All Girl Band
- Richard Carter as Harry De Wheels
- Todd Boyce as Mary's GI

== No Names No Pack Drill ==
The movie was based on the play No Names, No Packdrill, by Bob Herbert, uncle of Louis Nowra.

The play had its premiere in 1979 at the University of New England.

The play was performed by the Sydney Theatre Company in 1980 starring Mel Gibson and Noni Hazlehurst, directed by George Ogilvie. The production was so popular the season was extended at the Theatre Royal. An ABC radio production with the established Sydney cast was broadcast nationally then.

It has been revived several times, notably in 2006.

== Production ==
Considerable changes were made from the play, including turning the female lead from a postal worker into a singer in a female band. It was originally hoped to cast Olivia Newton-John in this role but Debra Byrne was cast instead and made a great personal success in it.

Director Mike Jenkins decided to push the musical aspect, and went for a stylised approach in collaboration with designer Brian Thomson. The manager of Matt Dillon, who was imported to play the lead, did not like the approach, saying it was too much like a Francis Ford Coppola movie - which Thomson took as a compliment. He wanted his client to appear in a straight period film closer to Breaker Morant. However Jenkins and Thomson's vision prevailed.

== Reception ==
The film was not a success. Director Mike Jenkins later said that:

It's funny, Rebel has attracted some fierce critiques from intellectuals who subsequently liked other things that I've done. But it also won five AFI awards and was the most nominated film of its year. It was a curious piece; it didn't altogether work. I was interested in it because of the basic story about the American boy who wants to desert. It said something about Australia and Sydney in World War II.

== Soundtrack ==
A Soundtrack was released in December 1985 and credited to Matt Dillon and Debbie Byrne. The album peaked at number 75 on the Kent Music Report.
