= List of Australian films of 1985 =

== 1985 ==
Title	Director	Cast	Genre	Notes
20,000 Leagues Under the Sea	Tim Brooke-Hunt	Tom Burlinson	Animation / Adventure	IMDb
After Marcuse	Ted Robinson	Diane Craig, Penne Hackforth-Jones, Grigor Taylor, David Whitney, Paul Mason, Jim Kemp, Muriel Hopkins, Carmen Warrington, Anna Phillips, Margaret Maddock	Drama TV film	First aired during 1988
An Indecent Obsession	Lex Marinos	Wendy Hughes, Gary Sweet, Richard Moir, Jonathan Hyde, Bruno Lawrence, Mark Little, Tony Sheldon, Bill Hunter, Julia Blake, Caroline Gillmer, Marina Finlay, John Sheerin, Andrew Martin, Mark Davis	Drama / War Feature film	IMDb
Archer	Denny Lawrence	Brett Climo, Nicole Kidman, Robert Coleby, Anna-Maria Monticelli, Tony Barry, Paul Bertram, Ernie Gray, John Flaus, Ernie Dingo	Adventure / Drama / Family TV film	aka Archer's Adventure
Banduk	Di Drew	Bayulma Marika, Garry McDonald, Joan Winchester, Yalumul Marika, Roy Marika, Gurumin Marika, Marika Munyurran, Tommy Munyurran	Drama / Family TV film	
The Big Hurt	Barry Peak	David Bradshaw, Lian Lunson, Simon Chilvers, John Ewart, Alan Cassell, Abbe Holmes, Alethea McGrath, Nick Waters	Thriller Feature film	IMDb
Bliss	Ray Lawrence	Barry Otto, Lynette Curran, Helen Jones, Miles Buchanan, Tim Robertson, Gia Carides, Bryan Marshall, Jon Ewing, Jeff Truman, Kerry Walker, Paul Chubb, Robert Menzies, Saskia Post, Les Foxcroft, Nique Needles	Comedy / Fantasy Feature film	IMDb, Entered into the 1985 Cannes Film Festival
Bootleg	John Prescott	Ray Meagher, Carmen Duncan, John Gregg, John Flaus, Ian Nimmo, Shelley Friend, Louise Siversen, Max Meldrum	Crime / Drama Feature film	IMDb
Breaking Up	Kathy Mueller	Candy Raymond, Nick Enright, Matt Stevenson, Bradley Kilpatrick	Drama ABC TV film	
Burke & Wills	Graeme Clifford	Jack Thompson, Nigel Havers, Greta Scacchi, Matthew Fargher, Chris Haywood, Ralph Cotterill, Drew Forsythe, Hugh Keays-Byrne, Les Foxcroft, Arthur Dignam	Adventure / Drama Feature film	IMDb, screened at the 1986 Cannes Film Festival
The Coca-Cola Kid	Dusan Makavejev	Eric Roberts, Greta Scacchi, Bill Kerr, Chris Haywood, Kris McQuade, Tony Barry, Max Gillies, Paul Chubb, Tim Finn, Rebecca Smart, Ian Gilmour, David Argue, Colleen Clifford, Esben Storm	Comedy / Romance Feature film	IMDb, Entered into the 1985 Cannes Film Festival
Cool Change	George Miller	Jon Blake, Lisa Armytage, Deborra-Lee Furness, Alec Wilson, James Wright, Robert Bruning, David Bradshaw, Mark Hembrow	Action / Adventure / Romance Feature film	IMDb
Don't Call Me Girlie	Andree Wright, Stewart Young	Aileen Britton, Charlotte Francis, Nancy Gurr	Documentary	IMDb
Dot and the Koala	Yoram Gross	Robyn Moore, Keith Scott	Animation / Family	IMDb
Double Sculls	Ian Gilmour	John Hargreaves, Chris Haywood, Angela Punch-McGregor, Bill Kerr, Judi Farr, Mercia Deane-Johns, Cecily Polson, Colleen Clifford, Jenny Vuletic, Vincent Ball, Vanessa Downing	Drama TV film	
Emerging	Kathy Mueller	Shane Connor, Sue Jones, Robyn Gibbes, Tibor Gyapjas, Monica Maughan, Alan Hopgood	Drama / Romance ABC TV film	
Emma's War	Clytie Jessop	Lee Remick, Miranda Otto, Mark Lee, Terence Donovan, Donal Gibson, Pat Evison, Grigor Taylor, Bridey Lee, Noeline Brown	Drama Feature film	IMDb
Emoh Ruo	Denny Lawrence	Joy Smithers, Martin Sacks, Philip Quast, Genevieve Mooy, Max Phipps Bill Young, Louise Le Nay, Jack Ellis, Mervyn Drake, Helen McDonald, Richard Carter, Di Smith	Comedy Feature film	IMDb
The Empty Beach	Chris Thomson	Bryan Brown, Anna Maria Monticelli, Nick Tate, Ray Barrett, Belinda Giblin, Peter Collingwood, Kerry Mack, Joss McWilliam, John Wood, Sally Cooper, Rebecca Smart	Drama / Mystery / Thriller Feature film	IMDb
Epic	Yoram Gross	Voices: Benita Collings, John Huston, Ross Higgins	Animation / Family Feature film	IMDb
Fair Game	Mario Andreacchio	Cassandra Delaney, Peter Ford, David Sandford, Don Barker, Carmel Young, Adrian Shirley, Wayne Anthony, Garry Who	Action / Drama / Horror / Thriller Feature film	
Flight into Hell	Gordon Flemyng	Helmut Zierl, Werner Stocker, Anne Tenney, Vincent Ball	ABC TV Mini Series	IMDb
Fortress	Arch Nicholson	Rachel Ward, Terence Donovan, David Bradshaw, Peter Hehir, Vernon Welles, Roger Stephen, Nick Waters, Sean Garlick, Marc Gray, Rebecca Rigg, Beth Buchanan, Asher Keddie, Anna Crawford, Wendy Playfair, Paul Chubb, Elaine Cusick, Laurie Moran	Drama / Thriller TV film	
Fran	Glenda Hambly	Noni Hazlehurst, Annie Byron, Alan Fletcher, Narelle Simpson, Travis Ward, Rosie Logie, Danny Adcock, Colin McEwan	Drama Feature film	IMDb
Frog Dreaming	Brian Trenchard-Smith	Henry Thomas, Tony Barry, Rachel Friend, Tamsin West, John Ewart, Dennis Miller, Katy Manning, Dempsey Knight, Peter Cummins	Drama / Family / Mystery Feature film	IMDb
Half Life: A Parable for the Nuclear Age	Dennis O'Rourke		Documentary	IMDb
Handle With Care	Paul Cox	Anna-Maria Monticelli, Monica Maughan, Nina Landis, Lucinda Cowden, Alex Taifer, Norman Kaye, Tony Llewellyn-Jones, Peter Adams, Sheila Florance, Bettina Arndt, Charles Tingwell	Drama / Documentary TV film	
I Can't Get Started	Rodney Fisher	Wendy Hughes, John Waters, Ben Gabriel, Donald MacDonald, Heather Mitchell, Sandy Gore, Lyndel Rowe, Jenny Lovell, Todd Boyce, Andrew McFarlane, Deborah Kennedy, Noel Ferrier, Margo Lee, Maureen Green, Mark Owen-Taylor, Victoria Longley, John Hannan, Helmut Bakaitis, Barry Quin, Les Dayman, Craig Pearce, Vanessa Downing, Andrew Tighe, Marilyn Allen, Milorad Mihajlovic	Drama / Romance TV film	IMDb
I Live with Me Dad	Paul Moloney	Peter Hehir, Haydon Samuels, Dennis Miller, Rebecca Gibney, Robyn Gibbes, Anthony Hawkins, Esben Storm, Val Lehman, Edward Hepple, Peter Cummins, Anne Charleston, Gus Mercurio	Comedy / Drama TV film	IMDb
I Own the Racecourse	Stephen Ramsey	Gully Coote, Tony Barry, Norman Kaye, Rodney Burke, Gillian Jones, Paul Bertram, Brett Climo, Safier Redzepaski, Anthony Mangan, Tim Elston, Bob Ellis	Drama / Family Feature film	
Jenny Kissed Me	Brian Trenchard-Smith	Ivar Kants, Deborra-Lee Furness, Tamsin West, Paula Duncan, Mary Ward, Tim Robertson, Nicholas Eadie, Steven Grives	Drama Feature film	IMDb
The Long Way Home	Catherine Millar	Richard Moir, Genevieve Picot, Peter Kowitz, Alan David Lee, Joanne Samuel	Drama / Thriller / War ABC TV film	
Mad Max Beyond Thunderdome	George Miller, George Ogilvie	Mel Gibson, Tina Turner, Bruce Spence, Frank Thring, Angry Anderson, Robert Grubb, George Spartels, Helen Buday, Justine Clarke, Adam Cockburn, Rebekah Elmaloglou	Action / Sci-Fi / Adventure Feature film	IMDb
The More Things Change...	Robyn Nevin	Judy Morris, Barry Otto, Victoria Longley, Lewis Fitz-Gerald, Peter Carroll, Louise Le Nay, Bill Bennett	Drama Feature film	IMDb
Natural Causes	Michael Carson	Geraldine Turner, Robyn Gurney, Gary Day, Bill Young	Drama ABC TV Film	
Niel Lynne	David Baker	Sigrid Thornton, Paul Williams, Judy Morris, Brandon Burke, David Argue, Tony Rickards, Nicki Paull, Alan Cinis, George Mallaby, Tim Robertson, John Howard	Drama Feature film	IMDb aka: "Best Enemies" in the UK
No Dance	Philip Brophy	Kim Beissel, Jillian Burt, Lino Caputo	Short	IMDb
The Occult Experience	Frank Heimans	Margot Adler, Michael Aquino, Lilith Sinclair	Documentary	IMDb
The Perfectionist	Chris Thomson	John Waters, Jacki Weaver, Steven Vidler, Kate Fitzpatrick, Noel Ferrier, Jennifer Claire, Vic Hawkins, Maggie Dence, Linda Cropper, Adam Willits, Steve Jacobs	Comedy / Drama / Romance TV film	
Rebel	Michael Jenkins	Matt Dillon, Debbie Byrne, Bryan Brown, Ray Barrett, Bill Hunter, Julie Nihill, Nikki Coghill, John O'May, Kim Deacon, Sheree Da Costa, Isabelle Anderson, Joy Smithers	Drama / Musical / War Feature film	IMDb
Relatives	Antony J. Bowman	Bill Kerr, Rowena Wallace, Carol Raye, Ray Barrett, Alyson Best, Jeanie Drynan, Norman Kaye, Brett Climo, Marian Dworakowski, Michael Atkin, Rebecca Elmaloglou, Ray Meager	Comedy / Drama Feature film	IMDb
Remember Me	Lex Marinos	Wendy Hughes, Richard Moir, Robert Grubb, Peter Gwynne, Carol Raye, Sandy Gore, Celia de Burgh, Kris McQuade, John Doyle, Bob Ellis, Charlotte Haywood	Horror / Thriller TV film	
Robbery	Michael Thornhill	John Sheerin, Tony Rickards, Duncan Wass, Tim Hughes, Rhys McConnochie, Regina Gaigalas, Joe Spano, Richard Meikle, Simon Chilvers, John Doyle, Tina Bursill	Action / Drama TV film	
Rooted	Ron Way	James Laurie, Genevieve Mooy, Peter Mochrie, Shane Connor, Kathleen Allen, Ian Spence, Terry Serio, Patricia Amphlett aka Little Pattie	Drama ABC TV film	
Short Changed	George Ogilvie	David Kennedy, Susan Leith, Jamie Agius, Ray Meagher, Mark Little, Jim Holt, Mac Silva, Lyndel Rowe, Ron Haddrick	Drama Feature film	IMDb
Sky Pirates	Colin Eggleston	John Hargreaves, Meredith Phillips, Max Phipps, Bill Hunter, Simon Chilvers, Alex Scott, David Parker, Adrian Wright, Wayne Cull, Peter Cummins, Narrator: Hayes Gordon	Adventure / Sci-Fi Feature film	IMDb
Spytrap: The True Story of Petrov and Philby	William Bemister	Keith Scott	Documentary	IMDb
Starship	Roger Christian	John Tarrant, Donogh Rees, Deep Roy, Joy Smithers	Sci-Fi Feature film	IMDb aka: "2084" and "Lorca and the Outlaws"
The Still Point	Barbara Boyd-Anderson	Nadine Garner, Lyn Semmler, Robin Cuming, Alex Menglet, Steve Bastoni, Kirsty Grant, Ben Mendelsohn	Drama Feature film	IMDb
Stock Squad	Howard Rubie	Martin Sacks, Gerard Kennedy, Kris McQuade, Richard Meikle, Michael O'Neill, Jay Hackett, Carmen Duncan, Tony Blackett, Philip Ross, Brendon Lunney, Su Cruickshank, Jim Holt	Action / Crime / Drama TV film	
A Street to Die	Bill Bennett	Chris Haywood, Jennifer Cluff, Peter Hehir, Peter Kowitz, Andrew Chirgwin, Susaanah Fowle, Ariathe Galani, Robin Ramsay, Brett Climo, Pat Evison	Drama Feature film	IMDb
Time After Time	Bill Hays	John Gielgud, Googie Withers	Drama	IMDb, Based on a novel by Molly Keane
Time's Raging	Sophia Turkiewicz	Judy Morris, Michael Aitkens, Lewis Fitz-Gerald, Vicki Luke, David Downer, Doug Bowles, Penne Hackforth-Jones	Drama ABC TV film	
Unfinished Business	Bob Ellis	John Clayton, Michele Fawdon, Norman Kaye, Bob Ellis, Andrew Lesnie	Comedy / Drama Feature film	IMDb
Warming Up	Bruce Best	Barbara Stephens, Henri Szeps, Queenie Ashton	Comedy / Family	IMDb
Wills & Burke	Bob Weis	Garry McDonald, Kim Gyngell, Peter Collingwood, Jonathan Hardy, Nicole Kidman, Chris Haywood, Rod Williams, Roy Baldwin, Simon Thorpe, Alex Menglet, Tony Rickards, Mark Mitchell, Mark Little	Comedy Feature film	IMDb
Wrong World	Ian Pringle	Richard Moir, Jo Kennedy, Nico Lathouris, Robbie McGregor, Cliff Ellen, Elise McLeod, Esben Storm	Drama Feature film	IMDb, Entered into the 35th Berlin International Film Festival

== See also ==
- 1985 in Australia
- 1985 in Australian television
