= 1985 in Australian television =

1985 in Australian television had a number of significant changes.

== Events ==
- 13 January – Australian children's live-action and puppet series The Maestro's Company begins on Network 0/28.
- January/February – Network 0/28 becomes known as SBS, and starts daytime broadcasts.
- 11 February – Ray Martin takes over Mike Walsh's old daytime slot, replacing The Mike Walsh Show with Midday with Ray Martin. The Mike Walsh Show continues and moves to 10:30pm weekdays as a late night talk show until Walsh departs the network in November.
- 22 February – Seven Network screens a late night sketchy comedy series called The Eleventh Hour featuring a number of performers who later appear in The Comedy Company and Fast Forward.
- 4 March – The ABC launches a one-hour news and current affairs program called The National as a replacement for the traditional 7:00pm state-based news bulletins as well as its former current affairs program Nationwide. The new format, costing the national broadcaster a budgeted $25 million, turned out to be an expensive failure and lasted less than twelve months.
- 18 March – Neighbours premieres on the Seven Network. Six months later, Neighbours is axed by HSV-7, but Network Ten bought the rights and picks up the soap; it becomes a massive hit for them.
- 24 March – Seven Network broadcasts Donald Duck's 50th Birthday a television special from The Wonderful World of Disney which celebrates the 50th anniversary of the world's famous cartoon character. It will first air on television for Australian viewers on Seven in Victoria that year and on Network Ten in New South Wales on 30 May 1987 and on Seven in Victoria again on 19 July the same year.
- 25 March – Neighbours debuts in Brisbane.
- 22 April – The 1980 film The Blues Brothers starring John Belushi and Dan Aykroyd premieres on the Seven Network.
- 8 June – Hey Hey It's Saturday moves to 6:30pm Saturdays. Then Hey Hey It's Saturday Night rebrands back to its original title.
- 30 June – SBS expands to Brisbane, Adelaide, Newcastle, Wollongong and the Gold Coast.
- 13–14 July – ABC televises the worldwide Live Aid event, featuring concerts held around the world.
- August – The AUSSAT satellites are launched. The ABC will start its test transmission of its TV and radio networks via satellite in October to remote areas in rural Australia. The ABC service is officially inaugurated in January 1986.
- 24 October – The ABC Board has elected to abandon The National.

== Debuts ==
=== Domestic ===
- 13 January – The Maestro's Company (SBS)
- 14 January – Possession (Nine Network)
- 26 January – The Early Bird Show (Network Ten)
- 4 February – The Cartoon Connection (Channel Seven)
- 6 February – The Italians (ABC)
- 11 February – Midday (Nine Network)
- 22 February – The Eleventh Hour (Channel Seven)
- 4 March – The National (ABC)
- 4 March – The Cowra Breakout (Network Ten)
- 4 March – News Overnight (Channel Seven)
- 6 March – The Investigators (ABC)
- 7 March - Pressure Point (ABC)
- 7 March - The Fast Lane (ABC)
- 18 March – Neighbours (Channel Seven in 1985, Network Ten from 1986 onwards)
- 29 March – Friday Night Football (AFL) (Channel Seven)
- 17 April – It's a Knockout (Network Ten)
- 9 May – The Henderson Kids (Network Ten)
- 20 May – Now You See It (Channel Seven)
- 27 May – Bang Goes the Budgie (ABC)
- 14 June – Golden Pennies (ABC)
- 15 July – Butterfly Island (ABC)
- 16 July – Quantum (ABC)
- 8 August – Captain Cookaburra's Road to Discovery (ABC)
- 27 October – Anzacs (Nine Network)

=== International ===
- 5 January – (United Kingdom) The Bounder (Channel Seven)
- 5 January – (United Kingdom) Hallelujah! (Channel Seven)
- 12 January – (United States) Rubik, the Amazing Cube (Network Ten)
- 20 January – (United Kingdom) Sorrell and Son (ABC)
- 4 February – (United States) V (1984) (Network Ten)
- 7 February – (United Kingdom) Duty Free (Channel Seven)
- 13 February – (United Kingdom) Spitting Image (Nine Network)
- 22 February – (United Kingdom) / (Wales) Joni Jones (SBS)
- 26 February – (United States) The Cosby Show (Nine Network)
- 28 February – (United States) Mickey Spillane's Mike Hammer (Stacy Keach) (Channel Seven)
- 4 March – (United Kingdom) Bananaman (ABC)
- 9 March – (United Kingdom) Terrahawks (Channel Seven)
- 22 March – (United Kingdom) Chocky (ABC)
- 24 March – (United States) Donald Duck's 50th Birthday (Channel Seven - Melbourne)
- 4 April – (Canada) The Edison Twins (Nine Network)
- 22 April – (United Kingdom) Danger: Marmalade At Work (ABC)
- 22 April – (United Kingdom) Fresh Fields (ABC)
- 29 April – (United States) Going Great (Nine Network)
- 29 April – (France) / (Japan) Ulysses 31 (ABC)
- 3 May – (United Kingdom) Chocky's Children (ABC)
- 6 May – (United Kingdom) Spacewatch (ABC)
- 6 May – (United Kingdom) The Wind in the Willows (1985) (ABC)
- 6 May – (United Kingdom) Barbara's World of Horses and Ponies (ABC)
- 9 May – (United States) Murder, She Wrote (Nine Network)
- 25 May – (United Kingdom) Ken Hom's Chinese Cookery (SBS)
- 3 June – (United Kingdom) Strangers and Brothers (ABC)
- 14 June (United Kingdom) One by One (ABC)
- 14 June – (United Kingdom) Sharon and Elsie (ABC)
- 5 July – (Sweden) Time Out (SBS)
- 13 July – (United States) The Biskitts (Nine Network)
- 14 July – (United States) Muppet Babies (Network Ten)
- 15 July – (United Kingdom) Just Good Friends (ABC)
- 16 July – (United Kingdom) The Young Ones (ABC)
- 19 July – (United States) The Little Rascals (Channel Seven)
- 20 July – (United States) Monchhichis (Nine Network)
- 31 July – (United Kingdom) Swallows and Amazons Forever! (ABC)
- 5 August – (United States) The Voyages of Doctor Dolittle (ABC)
- 9 August – (New Zealand) Children of the Dog Star (ABC)
- 10 August – (United States) Alvin and the Chipmunks (Ruby-Spears version) (Network Ten)
- 15 August – (United Kingdom) Home to Roost (Channel Seven)
- 7 September – (United States) Goldie Gold and Action Jack (Network Ten)
- 9 September – (United States) Pink Panther and Sons (Network Ten)
- 10 September – (United States) Mistral's Daughter (Nine Network)
- 12 September – (United States) Miami Vice (Nine Network)
- 16 September – (Egypt) Eyes (SBS)
- 16 September – (United States) Dungeons & Dragons (Channel Seven)
- 5 October – (United States) Dragon's Lair (Network Ten)
- 8 October – (Czechoslovakia) Expedition Adam 84 (ABC)
- 8 October – (United Kingdom) Winter Sunlight (ABC)
- 29 October – (Japan) / (United States) Voltron: Defender of the Universe (ABC)
- 31 October – (United Kingdom) Sea of Faith (ABC)
- 11 November – (United States) Cover Up (Channel Seven)
- 11 November – (United States) Double Dare (1985) (Channel Seven)
- 11 November – (United States) Charles in Charge (Channel Seven)
- 12 November – (United States) Oh Madeline (Nine Network)
- 12 November – (United States) Off the Rack (Nine Network)
- 12 November – (United States) Jessie (Channel Seven)
- 13 November – (United States) 50/50 (Nine Network)
- 19 November – (United States) Glitter (Network Ten)
- 21 November – (United Kingdom) Moving (ABC)
- 22 November – (United States) Kate & Allie (Channel Seven)
- 23 November – (United States) She-Ra: Princess of Power (Channel Seven)
- 25 November - (United States) Finder of Lost Loves (Network Ten)
- 27 November – (United States) Hot Pursuit (Channel Seven)
- 16 December – (United Kingdom) Blott on the Landscape (ABC)
- 23 December – (United States) Eye to Eye (Nine Network)
- 30 December – (United States) Two Marriages (Channel Seven)
- 31 December – (United Kingdom) The Max Headroom Show (ABC)
- (United States) / (Belgium) Snorks (Nine Network - Adelaide)
- (United Kingdom) Willo the Wisp (ABC)
- (United Kingdom) The Adventures of Portland Bill (ABC)

== Changes to network affiliation ==
This is a list of programs which made their premiere on an Australian television network that had previously premiered on another Australian television network. The networks involved in the switch of allegiances are predominantly both free-to-air networks or both subscription television networks. Programs that have their free-to-air/subscription television premiere, after previously premiering on the opposite platform (free-to air to subscription/subscription to free-to air) are not included. In some cases, programs may still air on the original television network. This occurs predominantly with programs shared between subscription television networks.

=== International ===
Program	New network(s)	Previous network(s)	Date
(United Kingdom) Michael Bentine's Potty Time	ABC	Channel Seven	27 May
(Hungary) Gustavus	SBS	ABC	14 July
(United States) Speed Buggy	Channel Seven	ABC	9 September
(United States) Atom Ant	Channel Seven	ABC	14 October

== Television shows ==
=== 1950s ===
- Mr. Squiggle and Friends (1959 – 1999)

=== 1960s ===
- Four Corners (1961 – present)

=== 1970s ===
- Hey Hey It's Saturday (1971 – 1999, 2009 – 2010)
- Young Talent Time (1971 – 1988)
- Countdown (1974 – 1987)
- Prisoner (1979 – 1986)

=== 1980s ===
- Wheel of Fortune (1981 – 2006, 2008)
- Sale of the Century (1980 – 2001)
- Sunday (1981 – 2008)
- Today (1982 – present)
- Perfect Match (1984 – 1989, 2002)
- Neighbours (1985 – present)

== Ending this year ==
Date	Show	Channel	Debut
21 April	The Gillies Report	ABC TV	1984
7 August	Five Mile Creek	Seven Network	1983
19 August	Bang Goes the Budgie	ABC TV	27 May 1985
31 October	Anzacs	Nine Network	27 October 1985
November	New Faces	Nine Network	1963
November (Late Night)	The Mike Walsh Show	Nine Network	1973
November	The Ernie Sigley Show	Nine Network	1968
1985	The New Price Is Right	Seven Network	7 September 1981

== See also ==
- 1985 in Australia
- List of Australian films of 1985
