= Peter Whitford =

Australian actor

- Born: 1939 (age 86–87); Adelaide, Australia
- Education: National Institute of Dramatic Art (1963)
- Occupations: Actor; playwright; director; singer
- Years active: 1950s–2010
- Known for: The Henderson Kids (1985); Strictly Ballroom (1992)

Peter Whitford (born 1939) is an Australian former radio, theatre, television and film character actor known for numerous roles particularly as wealthy businessmen and members of the aristocracy.

== Early life ==
Peter Whitford was born in Adelaide, South Australia. He studied at Sydney's National Institute of Dramatic Art (NIDA), graduating in 1963 with a Diploma of Dramatic Art (Acting).

== Career ==
Whitford is an actor, playwright, director and singer, who started his career in radio roles and then in theatre, beginning in 1958.

From the 1960s, Whitford then began appearing in film and television roles, which he continued up until 2010. When he graduated from NIDA in 1963, Whitford performed in ABC Radio play, King of Hearts. He then played Jack Porter in the long-running radio serial Blue Hills.

Whitford's theatre credits are numerous. His early stage roles were in university theatre at NIDA, in plays such as Julius Caesar, Hamlet, The Crucible, Waiting for Godot and The Cherry Orchard. He went on to act in productions for Northside Theatre Company, STC, MTC, Queensland Theatre Company, Old Tote Theatre Company and Belvoir Street. He also ventured into musical theatre with singing roles as the Governor in The Best Little Whorehouse in Texas, Moonface Martin in Anything Goes and Sir John in Me and My Girl.

Whitford had main roles in television beginning with the titular bachelor, Peter Prentice in Logie Award-winning ABC sitcom I've Married A Bachelor in 1968, and followed by racing car driver and Vera Collins' husband, Guy Sutton in soap opera Number 96 in 1976. Otherwise, he mostly took on guest roles in his early television career, in series including Ryan, Division 4, The Sullivans, Chopper Squad, Prisoner, Cop Shop, Kingswood Country, A Country Practice and Mother and Son.

Whitford had a recurring role in Carson's Law in 1983, and appeared in the 1984 Kennedy Miller Test cricket miniseries Bodyline, opposite Hugo Weaving and Gary Sweet. He then played the regular role of ruthless businessman and would-be developer, Ashley Wheeler in 1985 children's series, The Henderson Kids, also starring Kylie Minogue, Ben Mendelsohn and Nadine Garner.

During this time, Whitford also appeared in several films, including 1979 period drama My Brilliant Career starring Judy Davis and Sam Neill, 1983 biopic Phar Lap about the famed racing horse and 1986 Ozploitation film Dead End Drive-In.

Whitford then featured alongside Rebecca Gibney and Kerry Armstrong in 1990 miniseries Come in Spinner, as Mr Sharlton. He played a recurring role on Home and Away as Doctor Worthington from 1994 to 1995. He then had an ongoing role as retirement village resident Johnno Johnstone, in comedy series Bullpitt! from 1997 to 1998. He had guest roles throughout the late 1980s and 1990s in Rafferty's Rules, The Flying Doctors, G.P., Police Rescue, E Street, Blue Heelers.

Whitford starred as dancing official Les Kendall in Baz Luhrmann’s first film, the 1992 dance extravaganza Strictly Ballroom. Other film roles of that time included Dad and Dave: On Our Selection (1995) opposite Geoffrey Rush and Noah Taylor, and Oscar and Lucinda (1997) alongside Cate Blanchett and Ralph Fiennes. He played the stage manager in another one of Baz Luhrmann’s films, the 2001 musical Moulin Rouge! alongside Nicole Kidman and Ewan McGregor. That same year he had a part in comedy film The Man Who Sued God, opposite Judy Davis and Billy Connolly. The following year he appeared in legal drama Black and White, alongside Robert Carlyle, Charles Dance, Colin Friels and Ben Mendelsohn.

Television guest roles in the 2000s included Farscape, All Saints and Rake, the latter of which, in 2010, was his most recent appearance.

Whitford has also recorded audiobooks for the Vision Australia Information and Library Service, Louis Braille and the Royal Blind Society.

== Filmography ==
=== Film ===
Year	Title	Role	Notes
1977	The Tichborne Affair	Cubitt	TV movie
1978	Cass	Frank	TV movie
1979	My Brilliant Career	Uncle Julius	
1983	Phar Lap	Bert Wolfe	
1983	Careful, He Might Hear You	George	
1983	With Prejudice	Bodor	
1984	Who Killed Hannah Jane?	James Gannon	TV movie
1986	Dead End Drive-In	Thompson	
1987	Running from the Guns	Terry	
1988	Warm Nights on a Slow Moving Train	Steward	
1988	Computer Ghosts	Uncle Oscar	
1992	Strictly Ballroom	Les Kendall	
1992	The Time Game	Mr Green	TV movie
1993	The Burning Piano: A Portrait of Patrick White	Self	
1995	Dad and Dave: On Our Selection	Mr Todd	
1997	Oscar and Lucinda	Mr Ahearn	
1909	Passion	Tour Manager	
1909	The Three Stooges	Dell Henderson (Administrator)	TV movie
2001	Moulin Rouge!	Stage Manager	
2001	The Man Who Sued God	Moderator	
2002	Black and White	Justice Windeyer	
2006	Unfolding Florence: The Many Lives of Florence Broadhurst	Voice	Docudrama
2008	Fool’s Gold	Judge	

=== Television ===
Year	Title	Role	Notes
1966	66 and All That	Self / Various	
1967	Australian Playhouse		Anthology series, 1 episode
1967–1968	Contrabandits	Doorman / Waiter / Bingo	2 episodes
1968–1969	I've Married A Bachelor	Peter Prentice	14 episodes
1968–1973	Homicide	Ward / Johnny Tate	2 episodes
1970	The Link Men	Seaman	1 episode
1970	The Rovers	Rogers	1 episode
1970	Mrs. Finnegan	Clarrie Mooresfield	1 episode
1970–1975	Division 4	Brian Doherty / Neil Henderson / Peter Johnson	3 episodes
1971	The Godfathers	Dusty Rhodes	1 episode
1973	Ryan	Billy Maxwell	1 episode
1975	The Company Men		Miniseries, 1 episode
1976	Number 96	Guy Sutton	40 episodes
1977	The Restless Years	Maurice Brown	
1978	Chopper Squad	Poof	1 episode
1978	Case for the Defence	Institution Director	1 episode
1979	Skyways	Nigel Forsythe	1 episode
1980	Home Sweet Home	Mike Furnont	Miniseries, 1 episode
1980	Water Under the Bridge	T.C. Shallicott	Miniseries, 3 episodes
1980; 1984	Kingswood Country	Hayden De Witt / Bill the Salesman	3 episodes
1981	Prisoner	Det Sgt Gordon	1 episode
1981	Cop Shop	Father Daniel Monahan	2 episodes
1982; 1984	A Country Practice	Roger McLean / Alwyn Watson	8 episodes
1983–1984	Carson's Law	Don Randall / Inspector Hudson	10 episodes
1984	Five Mile Creek	Mr Anderson	1 episode
1984	Sweet and Sour	Audition Director	1 episode
1984	The Last Bastion	H. V. Evatt	Miniseries, 3 episodes
1984	Bodyline	Robertson	Miniseries, 2 episodes
1985	Mother and Son	Minister	1 episode
1985	Butterfly Island	Fred	6 episodes
1985	Winners	Mr Donaldson	1 episode
1985	Special Squad	Stan	Episode 1: "Trojan Horses"
1985	The Henderson Kids	Ashley Wheeler	22 episodes
1986	Prime Time	Charles Garrett	1 episode
1987	Flight into Hell		Miniseries
1987; 1989	Rafferty's Rules	William Walker / Harmon	2 episodes
1988	Australians	Mr Crosby	Miniseries, episode 6: "Lola Montez"
1989; 1994–1995	Home and Away	Mick O’Reilly / Doctor Worthington	12 episodes
1990	The Flying Doctors	Robert Bell	1 episode
1990	Come In Spinner	Mr Sharlton	Miniseries, 4 episodes
1990	G.P.	James/Jane Kennedy	1 episode
1992	Police Rescue	Russell	Season 2, episode 6: "Stakeout"
1993	Under the Skin		1 episode
1993	E Street	Dr John Halliday	1 episode
1993	Blood Brothers		TV movie series
1997	Blue Heelers	Bernie Lochren	1 episode
1997–1998	Bullpitt!	John Cazaley 'Johnno' Johnstone	26 episodes
1998	Children's Hospital	Surgical Specialist	1 episode
1999; 2009	All Saints	Walter Elliott / Russell Woods	2 episodes
2001	Escape of the Artful Dodger	Father O’Brien	1 episode
2002	Backberner	Henry Tinkwhistle	1 episode
2002	Farscape	Jabula, Clan Chieftain	1 episode
2010	Rake	Judge Keddie	1 episode

== Radio ==
Year	Title	Role	Notes	Ref.
1963	King of Hearts		ABC Radio play	
	Blue Hills	Jack Porter	ABC Radio serial	
1970s	A Place in the Sun		4BU Radio serial	
1985	The Club	Ted	ABC Radio play	

== Stage ==
=== As actor ===
Year	Title	Role	Notes
1958	An Evening of One Act Plays: Double Demon / Repeat Performance / Two Gentlemen of Soho		University of Adelaide
1958	Androcles and the Lion / The Happy Journey		Union Hall, Adelaide
1959; 1962	Julius Caesar		Union Hall, Adelaide
1961	Journey’s End		Willard Hall, Adelaide
1961	Hamlet	Horatio	Woodville High School, Adelaide with Shakespearean Drama Group
1961	A Resounding Tinkle		Willard Hall, Adelaide with Theatres Associated
1962	The Crucible	Ezekiel Cheever	Cell Block Theatre, Sydney
1962	The Drunken Sisters	Apollo	UNSW, Sydney
1962	The Power of Darkness		UNSW, Sydney with NIDA
1962	Waiting for Godot	Pozzo	UNSW, Sydney
1963	The Cherry Orchard		UNSW Old Tote Theatre, Sydney
1963	The Fire Raisers		UNSW Old Tote Theatre, Sydney
1963	The Playboy of the Western World		UNSW Old Tote Theatre, Sydney
1963	Hamlet		UNSW Old Tote Theatre, Sydney
1963	The Ballad of Angel's Alley	Bill Fiddler	UNSW Old Tote Theatre, Sydney, Harry Jensen Number 4 Club, Sydney
1965	The Representative		UNSW, Sydney
1965	The Knack	Colin	Phillip Theatre, Sydney
1965	My Life with an Interval for Asprin		Independent Theatre, Sydney
1966	A Refined Look at Existence	Jack Champion	Jane St Theatre, Sydney
1966	Halloran's Little Boat		Jane St Theatre, Sydney
1967	The Imaginary Invalid		UNSW Old Tote Theatre, Sydney
1967	The School for Scandal		UNSW Old Tote Theatre, Sydney
1968	The Runaway Steamboat	Quickly-Quickly	Australia Hall, Adelaide
1969	Trouble in the Works		AMP Theatrette, Sydney with Q Theatre
1969	The Conversion of the Anglo-Saxons		AMP Theatrette, Sydney with Q Theatre
1969	Mrs Porter and the Angel	Edgar	PACT Youth Theatre
1969	The Rise and Fall of Boronia Avenue		Jane St Theatre, Sydney with NIDA
1969	Visitor from Hollywood		Theatre Royal Sydney with J. C. Williamson's
1970	The Trial of the Catonsville Nine		Pitt Street Congregational Church, Sydney with Stable Productions
1971	ERF: A Theatrical Cartoon		The Hole in the Wall Theatre, Perth, Playhouse, Canberra, Ensemble Theatre, Sydney
1972	The Ghost Train		Killara Community Theatre, Sydney
1973	Butley		Independent Theatre, Sydney, Playhouse, Canberra with Old Tote Theatre Company
1973	Convict Cakewalk		AMP Theatrette, Sydney with Q Theatre
1973	By Candlelight		Sydney
1974	The Cradle of Hercules		Sydney Opera House with Old Tote Theatre Company
1974	That Championship Season	Tom Daley	UNSW Old Tote Theatre, Sydney with J. C. Williamson's
1975	Kennedy's Children		Playhouse Adelaide, St Martins Theatre, Melbourne with MTC & SATC
1976	Saturday Sunday Monday		Independent Theatre, Sydney
1976	The Season at Sarsaparilla	Clive Pogson	Sydney Opera House with Old Tote Theatre Company
1977	The Magistrate	Wyke	Sydney Opera House with Old Tote Theatre Company
1977	The Alchemist	Pertinax Surly	UNSW Old Tote Theatre, Sydney
1977	The Three Sisters	Andrey	Sydney Opera House with Old Tote Theatre Company
1977	A Funny Thing Happened on the Way to the Forum	Hysterium	Marian St Theatre, Sydney
1978	The Cat and the Canary	Harry Blythe	UNSW Old Tote Theatre, Sydney
1978	Just Between Ourselves	Dennis	UNSW Old Tote Theatre, Sydney
1978	Catch Me If You Can	Inspector Levine	Marian St Theatre, Sydney
1979	Hedda Gabler	George Tesman	SGIO Theatre, Brisbane with QTC
1989	Rum for your Money		Marian St Theatre, Sydney
1989	Cyrano de Bergerac	Ragueneau	Sydney Opera House with STC
1980; 1981	The Best Little Whorehouse in Texas	CJ Scruggs / Governor / Voiceovers	Her Majesty's Theatre, Sydney, Her Majesty's Theatre, Melbourne with J. C. Williamson's
1981	Eyes of the Whites	Tom Lashwood	Nimrod St Theatre, Sydney
1982	A Map of the World		Opera Theatre, Adelaide with STC
1987	The Country Wife		Sydney Opera House with STC
1987; 1988	See How They Run		Northside Theatre, Sydney, Marian St Theatre, Sydney
1988	Ghosts		Belvoir St Theatre, Sydney
1988	Why Me?		Marian St Theatre, Sydney
1988	A Small Family Business		Northside Theatre, Sydney
1989	When We Are Married		Northside Theatre, Sydney
1989; 1990	Anything Goes	Moonface Martin	Australia & NZ tour with Victoria State Opera
1992	Dial M For Murder		Playhouse, Adelaide
1992	Prin		Marian St Theatre, Sydney
1992	Vassa		NIDA Parade Studio, Sydney
1993	The Perfectionist		Marian St Theatre, Sydney
1993	Keeping Mum!		Marian St Theatre, Sydney
1993	A Bedfull of Foreigners		West End Rialto, Brisbane, Seymour Centre, Sydney, Playhouse, Adelaide with Les Currie Productions
1993	Me and My Girl	Sir John Tremayne	Australia & NZ tour
1996; 1997	The John Wayne Principle	John Hoiquist	Wharf Theatre, Sydney, Malthouse Theatre, Melbourne with STC
2000	The Marriage of Figaro	Dr. Bartholo	Sydney Opera House

=== As director ===
Year	Title	Role	Notes
1969	Mrs Porter and the Angel	Musical Director	PACT Youth Theatre
1971	ERF: A Theatrical Cartoon	Director	Hole in the Wall Theatre, Perth, Playhouse, Canberra, Ensemble Theatre, Sydney
1979	The Murder Room	Director	Marian St Theatre, Sydney
1979	The Chairman	Director	Marian St Theatre, Sydney
1980	A Resounding Tinkle	Director	AMP Theatrette, Sydney with The Australian Repertory Company
1981	Trap for a Lonely Man	Director	Bondi Pavilion, Sydney with Players Theatre Company
1981	Me 'n' Me Mate	Director	NSW regional tour with Arts Council of Australia
1991	Sailor Beware!	Director	Marian St Theatre, Sydney
