= 1985 in Australia =

- Monarch: Elizabeth II
- Governor-General: Sir Ninian Stephen
- Prime minister: Bob Hawke
- Population: 15,788,312
- Australian of the Year: Paul Hogan
- Elections: VIC, SA

The following lists events that happened during 1985 in Australia.

- Decades: 1960s; 1970s; 1980s; 1990s; 2000s
- See also: 1985 in Australian television; 1985 in Australian literature; Other events of 1985; Timeline of Australian history

== Incumbents ==
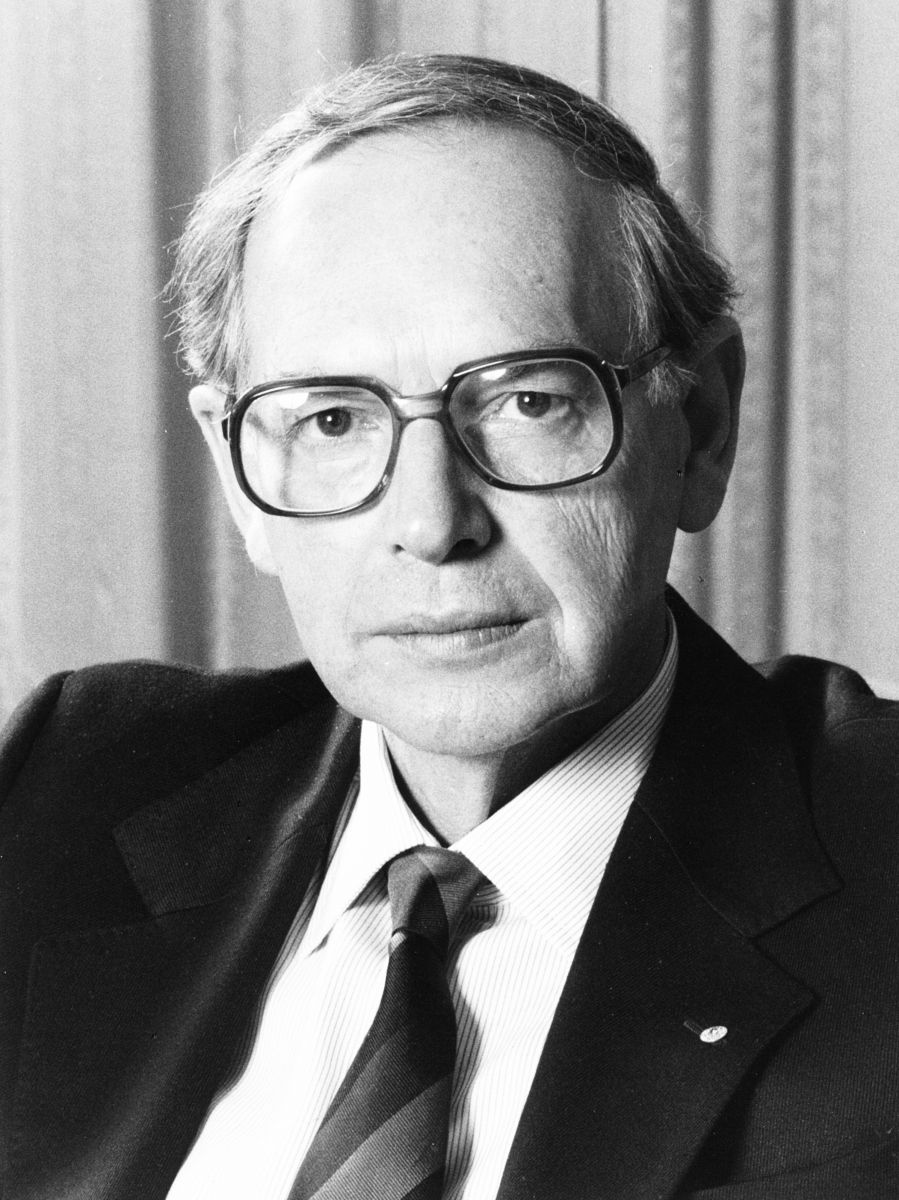
Sir Ninian Stephen

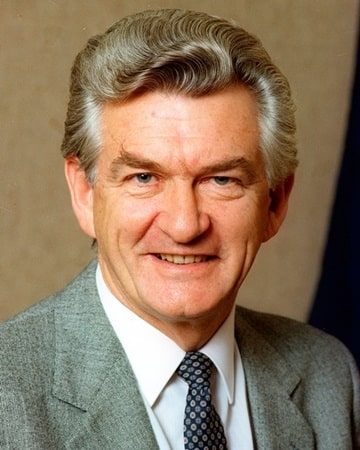
Bob Hawke

- Monarch – Elizabeth II
- Governor-General – Sir Ninian Stephen
- Prime Minister – Bob Hawke
  - Deputy Prime Minister – Lionel Bowen
  - Opposition Leader – Andrew Peacock (until 5 September), then John Howard
- Chief Justice – Sir Harry Gibbs

=== State and territory leaders ===
- Premier of New South Wales – Neville Wran
  - Opposition Leader – Nick Greiner
- Premier of Queensland – Sir Joh Bjelke-Petersen
  - Opposition Leader – Nev Warburton
- Premier of South Australia – John Bannon
  - Opposition Leader – John Olsen
- Premier of Tasmania – Robin Gray
  - Opposition Leader – Ken Wriedt
- Premier of Victoria – John Cain Jr.
  - Opposition Leader – Jeff Kennett
- Premier of Western Australia – Brian Burke
  - Opposition Leader – Bill Hassell
- Chief Minister of the Northern Territory – Ian Tuxworth
  - Opposition Leader – Bob Collins
- Chief Minister of Norfolk Island – David Buffett

=== Governors and administrators ===
- Governor of New South Wales – Sir James Rowland
- Governor of Queensland – Sir James Ramsay (until 21 July), then Sir Walter Campbell
- Governor of South Australia – Sir Donald Dunstan
- Governor of Tasmania – Sir James Plimsoll
- Governor of Victoria – Sir Brian Murray (until 3 October)
- Governor of Western Australia – Gordon Reid
- Administrator of Norfolk Island – Raymond Trebilco (until 28 April), then John Matthew
- Administrator of the Northern Territory – Eric Johnston

== Events ==
=== January ===
- 1 January – Australia commences a two-year term as a member of the United Nations Security Council.
- 19 January – A hailstorm accompanied by severe winds sweeps through Brisbane and surrounding areas, causing an estimated $110 million of property damage. Subsequently, around 95,000 insurance claims are lodged.
- 28 January – Victorian Premier John Cain's support for reforms to the Upper House rather than its abolition defuse this as an election issue.
- 29 January – Federal Cabinet endorses an earlier decision to provide refuelling facilities to United States aircraft monitoring MX missile tests in the Pacific. Strong anti-American and anti-nuclear reaction soon forces Prime Minister Bob Hawke to withdraw the offer.

=== February ===
- 1 February – AM stereo broadcasting starts in Australia.
- 5 February – The United States of America withdraws from a planned ANZUS naval exercise because New Zealand refused to permit nuclear-capable warships to call at its ports. Australia cancels its involvement in U.S.-led MX missile tests.

=== March ===
- March – The Bondi beast rapist commits his first assault in Clovelly, New South Wales.
- 1 March – Uniform credit legislation is introduced in New South Wales, Victoria and Western Australia.
- 2 March – The ALP government of John Cain reelected in Victoria for a second consecutive term with 47 seats and over 50% of the primary vote. A tied result in Nunawading, decided in Labor's favour, is later declared void by Justice Starke.
- 4 March – At the request of the United States, the Federal Government cancels the annual meeting of the ANZUS Council.
- 21 March – The Queensland Government enacts harsh anti-strike legislation.
- 23 March – Two electric trains collide head on just north of Trinder Park railway station in Woodridge, Queensland at 6.47 a.m. Two people including a train driver, are killed in the smash, and another 28 people are injured.
- 30 March – Alderman Sallyanne Atkinson is elected as Brisbane's first female Lord Mayor.
- 31 March – In excess of 300,000 people throughout Australia march in the Palm Sunday anti-nuclear rallies.

=== April ===
- 20 April – The Duke of Kent officially opens the Queensland Performing Arts Complex at a gala Royal Festival Performance. The opening celebrations – which include a parade, the launching of masses of balloons, fireworks and a fly-over by RAAF aircraft – are scheduled to continue for almost a month.
- 26 April – Mr. Justice Lionel Murphy is committed for trial on two charges of attempting to pervert the course of justice.
- 28 April – The Nuclear Disarmament Party (NDP) splits.

=== May ===
- 14 May – Federal Treasurer Paul Keating releases a mini-Budget aimed at reducing Government spending, with cuts falling mainly on defence and the unemployed.
- 20 May – Queensland police raid the Greenslopes Fertility Clinic, Brisbane and seize the patient files of 20,000 women. The search warrant is later ruled invalid and the files returned. Other raids are carried out on clinics in Brisbane and Townsville.
- 30 May – At the Premiers' Conference, the Grants Commission makes cuts, especially to the Northern Territory and Queensland. Business and conservative interests praise Federal Treasurer Paul Keating as a result.

=== June ===
- 2 June - The vehicular ferry Empress of Australia makes its last trip between the mainland and Tasmania.
- 4 June
  - Victoria celebrates its 150th anniversary.
  - A Government White Paper presents three options for taxation.
- 24 June - Up to 40,000 farmers march on Parliament House, Melbourne protesting Labor's rural policies.

=== July ===
- 1 July – 4 July – A Tax Summit is held. Federal Treasurer Paul Keating abandons his preferred Option C (a 12.5% retail sales tax) after a public outcry.
- 11 July Minister of Transport, Hon. D.F. Lane, M.L.A opened Albion Station.

=== August ===
- 6 August – The merging of two retail chain operations creates Coles Myer Limited.
- 17 August – The 1985 Nunawading Province state by-election is held for the Victorian Legislative Council seat of Nunawading Province. which Labor loses with a swing of around 4.5% against it, returning minority status to the Legislative Council.
- 22 August – The Royal Commission on the use and effects of chemical agents on Australian personnel in Vietnam finds no link between the chemical defoliant Agent Orange and the health problems of the Vietnam War veterans.

=== September ===
- 5 September – John Howard replaces Andrew Peacock as federal Liberal leader and thus federal Leader of the Opposition. Neil Brown beats 11 others to become Deputy Leader.
- 10 September – Simon Crean becomes President of the Australian Council of Trade Unions.
- 20 September – Capital gains tax is introduced. The rules allow the cost of assets held for 1 year or more to be indexed by the consumer price index (CPI) before calculating a gain.
- 21 September – At the inaugural "Light on the Hill" dinner at Bathurst, Prime Minister Bob Hawke describes privatisation as the "height of irrationality" and a "recipe for disaster".

=== October ===
- 3 October – Victorian Premier John Cain announces the resignation of Victorian Governor Sir Brian Murray over his acceptance of discounted air fares from Continental Airlines. The issue dragged on for several years, causing much embarrassment and recrimination.
- 9 October – Victorian Police investigate complaints from the Nuclear Disarmament Party on bogus how-to-vote cards issued during the 1985 Nunawading Province state by-election, authorised by Australian Labor Party state secretary Peter Batchelor.
- 12 October – Canon Arthur Malcolm becomes the first Aboriginal Bishop in Australia.
- 24 October – South Australian Ombudsman Mary Beasley resigns over much publicity over travel concessions for her partner Susan Mitchell. Her successor Grant Edwards resigns on the same day, subject to an inquiry, with Eugene Biganovsky thus becoming the third to hold the office within the one day.
- 26 October – The Mutijulu Aboriginal community is given freehold title to Ayers Rock and the Uluru National Park.

=== November ===
- 13 November – Mr. Justice Paul Brereton introduces amendments to the Darling Harbour Bill, stating that the intransigence of the SSC had forced the New South Wales Government to exempt the controversial Sydney Monorail from normal planning controls and claiming that the casino planned for the site would spell the end to illegal gambling.
- 25 November – A man, later to be revealed as Bruce Goodluck, wears a chicken suit and walks into the House of Representatives and sits on the government front bench but is removed by officers at the request of the deputy speaker, Allan Rocher.

=== December ===
- 2 December – Federal Parliament passes the Australia Act, cutting the nation's last legal and constitutional ties with Britain.
- 4 December – Retiring New South Wales Local Government Minister Kevin Stewart sacks Warringah Shire Council for negligence and granting favours to a developer.
- 5 December – The Royal Commission into British atomic tests in Australia (McClelland Royal Commission) severely criticises Britain for violating safety standards and recommends that Britain clean up contaminated areas and pay compensation.
- 7 December – The Labor government of John Bannon is re-elected for a second term in South Australia.
- 16 December – New South Wales Premier Neville Wran is charged with contempt of court by the Federal Department of Public Prosecutions in relation to remarks he had made on 28 November when the Appeal Court had ordered a new trial for Mr. Justice Lionel Murphy.
- 22 December – The new Victorian Governor is announced as academic and Uniting Church minister, Rev. Davis McCaughey, to be sworn in on 18 February 1986.
- 30 December – Rural discontent at soaring interest rates and falling commodity prices is symbolised by a Canowindra farmer when he dumps 23 tonnes of wheat outside Parliament House in Canberra. His subsequent prosecution prompts a mass rally of up to 8,000 famers in Canberra on 14 February 1986.

=== Unknown dates ===
- New South Wales abolishes capital punishment for treason and piracy with violence, thereby abolishing capital punishment from Australia.
- The McClelland Royal Commission into the nuclear tests at Maralinga in the 1950s reports its findings.

== Arts and literature ==
- 18 February – Australia wins the 26th Viña del Mar International Song Festival with the song I can no longer (sung in Spanish as Ya no puedo más), created by K. C. Porter, Turner y Toppano, and sung by Lorenzo Toppano.
- 9 March – The National Gallery of Australia purchases the painting L'Après-midi à Naples (Afternoon in Naples) by Paul Cézanne for A$1 million.
- Christopher Koch's novel The Doubleman wins the Miles Franklin Award

== Film ==
- Bliss
- Burke & Wills
- The Coca-Cola Kid
- Mad Max Beyond Thunderdome

== Television ==
- 11 February – Ray Martin takes over Mike Walsh's old daytime slot, replacing The Mike Walsh Show with Midday with Ray Martin.
- 18 February – Network 0/28 becomes known as SBS.
- 18 March – Neighbours premieres on the Seven Network. Six months later Neighbours is axed by HSV-7 with the final episode going to air on 8 November 1985. Network Ten subsequently buys the rights and begins screening it from 20 January 1986 where it becomes a hit.
- 8 June – Hey Hey It's Saturday moves to 6:30 pm Saturdays.

== Sport ==
- 18 January – First day of the 1985 World Indoor Games in Paris, France, where six Australian athletes are competing: Michael Hillardt (1500 metres), Clayton Kearney (60 and 200 metres), Dave Smith (5000m Walk), Nicole Boegman (Long Jump), Gael Martin (Shot Put), and Deann Mayfield (High Jump). Hillardt wins the gold in the 1500 metres, while Smith claims bronze.
- 24 March – Robert de Castella is once again Australia's best finisher at the IAAF World Cross Country Championships, this time staged in Lisbon, Portugal. He finishes in 20th place (34:17.0) in the race over 12,190 metres.
- 9 June – Grenville Wood wins the men's national marathon title, clocking 2:13:37 in Sydney, while Elizabeth Patmore claims the women's title in 2:45:47.
- 11 June – New South Wales win their first Rugby League State of Origin series.
- 17 August – North Melbourne play their last game at the Arden Street Oval. North Melbourne defeat Richmond, 16.20.116 to 9.12.66.
- 28 September – Glenelg defeat North Adelaide for the South Australian National Football League (SANFL) flag.
- 28 September – Essendon (26.14.170) defeat Hawthorn (14.8.92) to win the 89th VFL premiership. It is the second consecutive premiership for Essendon.
- 29 September – The Canterbury Bulldogs defeat minor premiers the St. George Dragons 7–6 to win the 78th NSWRL premiership. It is also the second consecutive premiership for Canterbury. Illawarra Steelers finish in last position, claiming the wooden spoon.
- 3 November – The first Formula One Australian Grand Prix takes place on the streets of Adelaide.
- 5 November – What A Nuisance wins the Melbourne Cup.
- 4 December – Australia are unable to undo a 2–0 deficit from the first leg and draw 0–0 with Scotland in the World Cup qualifying playoff at Olympic Park, failing to qualify for the 1986 FIFA World Cup.
- 10 December – 120 members are inducted into the new Sport Australia Hall of Fame.

== Births ==
- 2 January – Damien Bodie, actor
- 7 January – Jessica Michalik, teenage girl (died 2001)
- 12 January – Brad Robbins, basketball player
- 21 January – Matt Unicomb, basketball player
- 28 January – Libby Trickett, swimmer
- 29 January – Isabel Lucas, actress
- 30 January – Richie Porte, cyclist
- 12 February – Saskia Burmeister, actor
- 13 February – Bridget Neval, actress
- 17 February – Anne Curtis, actress
- 18 February – Brad Newley, basketball player
- 6 March – Yael Stone, actress
- 7 March
  - Cameron Prosser, swimmer
  - Daniel Munday, basketball player
- 12 March – Nikolai Topor-Stanley, soccer player
- 13 March – Sean Carlow, figure skater
- 14 March – Steven Marković, basketball player
- 19 March – Sean Wroe, track and field sprinter
- 22 March – Kelli Waite, swimmer
- 27 March – Danny Vuković, soccer player
- 8 April – Adrian Bauk, basketball player
- 13 April – Anna Jennings-Edquist, actress
- 16 April – Rhiana Griffith, model and actress
- 17 April – Luke Mitchell, actor
- 3 May – David Reynolds, racing driver
- 11 May
  - Beau Ryan, rugby league player and sportscaster
  - Jaime Robbie Reyne, actor
- 22 May – Stephanie Zhang, figure skater
- 31 May – Matthew Knight, basketball player
- 5 June – Tim Coenraad, basketball player
- 10 June – Dane Nielsen, rugby league player
- 12 June – Sam Thaiday, rugby league player
- 21 June – Sharna Burgess, ballroom dancer
- 30 June
  - Hugh Sheridan, actor, musician and television presenter
  - Lasarus Ratuere, actor
- 5 July – Stephanie McIntosh, actress
- 27 July – Aljin Abella, actor
- 3 August
  - Georgina Haig, actress
  - Tim Slade, racing driver
- 18 August – Brooke Harman, American-born actress
- 19 August – Gavin Cooper, rugby league player
- 29 August – Joshua Jefferis, gymnast
- 30 August – Leisel Jones, swimmer
- 13 September – Scott Arnold, golfer
- 29 September – Michelle Payne, jockey
- 30 September
  - Adam Cooney, footballer
  - David Gower, rugby league player
- 10 October – Ricki-Lee Coulter, singer
- 14 October – Nicholas Colla, actor
- 16 October – Casey Stoner, motorcycle racer
- 23 October – Lachlan Gillespie, singer and actor
- 24 October – Tim Pocock, actor
- 5 November – Kate DeAraugo, singer
- 9 November – Timothy Lang, basketball player
- 23 December – Luke O'Loughlin, actor

=== Full date unknown ===
- Neil Erikson, far right activist

== Deaths ==
- 11 January – William McKell, 12th Governor General of Australia and 27th Premier of New South Wales (b. 1891)
- 29 January – Billy Cook, jockey (b. 1910)
- 2 April – Doris Fitton, actress and theatrical director (born in the Philippines) (b. 1897)
- 3 May – Percy Spender, New South Wales politician and diplomat (b. 1897)
- 18 June – John England, New South Wales politician and Administrator of the Northern Territory (b. 1911)
- 9 August – Clive Churchill, rugby league player (b. 1927)
- 20 August – Ken Kennedy, ice speed skater (b. 1913)
- 16 December – Mervyn Waite, cricketer and Australian rules footballer (b. 1911)
- 28 December – Sir Henry Winneke, 21st Governor of Victoria and Chief Justice of Victoria (b. 1908)

== See also ==
- 1985 in Australian television
- List of Australian films of 1985
