= Esme Melville =

Australian actress (1918–2006)

- Born: Esme Grace Mount-Melville; 23 July 1918; Norwood, South Australia, Australia
- Died: 14 September 2006 (aged 88); Melbourne, Victoria, Australia
- Occupations: Theatre, television and film actress
- Years active: 1939-2006
- Known for: Neighbours

Esme Melville (born Esme Grace Mount-Melville, 23 July 1918 – 14 September 2006) was an Australian theatre, television and film actress. At the Tropfest awards for 2003 she won Best Actor – Female for her role of Granma in the short film, Forbidden. At the 2007 Australian Film Institute Awards she was nominated for Best Supporting Actress for her role of Miss Collard in Romulus, My Father.

Her theatre roles included Mrs. Bedwin in Oliver! (1961–62, 1966–67). Melville had four separate ongoing roles on television soap opera, Neighbours, including as Rose Belker during 2006.

== Biography ==
Esme Melville was born as Esme Grace Mount-Melville on 23 July 1918 and grew up in Norwood. Her mother was Margaret Mount-Melville. Melville started as a theatre actress in Adelaide in 1939 – just before the outbreak of World War II.

On 11 May 1944 Melville enrolled into the Women's Royal Australian Naval Service as a transport driver and was honourably discharged on 13 September 1946 from Victoria Barracks in Melbourne. She remained in that city and from 1956 worked at St Martins Theatre for eight years.

== Television roles ==
Her television credits of the 1970s included various guest roles in the Crawford Productions police dramas Homicide, Division 4, Matlock Police and Bluey. Other appearances included guest roles in Crawford's adventure series Ryan (1973), and in the miniseries Power Without Glory (1976).

Later television appearances include Cop Shop (1978), Sons and Daughters (1982), Special Squad (1984), The Flying Doctors (1986), Sugar and Spice (1988), Phoenix (1992), Round the Twist (1993), Wedlocked (1994), The Damnation of Harvey McHugh (1994), The Man from Snowy River (1994), Mercury (1996), Driven Crazy (1998), Eugenie Sandler P.I. (2000), SeaChange (2000), Stingers (2000), The Secret Life of Us (2001), miniseries Bootleg (2002), miniseries After the Deluge (2003), Real Stories (2006).

She also made frequent appearances in televisions series Prisoner, Blue Heelers, and Neighbours. For the latter series she portrayed four different characters starting in 1986 with Mrs. York and most recently, in 2006, as the hard-of-hearing, Rose Belker.

== Theatre roles ==
Her theatre roles include Serita in Waiting in the Wings, Mrs Grey in The Secretary Bird (1969) and Mrs. Bedwin in Oliver (1961–62, 1966–67).

She worked in theatre until 2005, a year before her death

== Film roles ==
Melville also acted in several feature films including Alvin Purple Rides Again (1974), Dimboola (1979), I Can Jump Puddles (1981) (TV), Squizzy Taylor (1982), Annie's Coming Out (1984), Niel Lynne (1985), The Four Minute Mile (1988) (TV), Mull (1989), Spotswood (1992), Say a Little Prayer (1993), The Heartbreak Kid (1993), Dead End (1999), Siam Sunset (1999), A Telephone Call for Genevieve Snow (2000), Dalkeith (2001), Crackerjack (2002), Forbidden (2003) and Romulus, My Father (2007).

At the Tropfest awards for 2003, Melville won "Best Actor–Female" for her role of Granma in the short film, Forbidden. At the 2007 Australian Film Institute Awards, she was nominated for "Best Supporting Actress" for her role of Miss Collard in Romulus, My Father. She worked in student films, independent short films, did voice-overs and appeared in TV ads.

Esme Melville died on 14 September 2006 after a short illness, aged 88.

== Filmography ==
=== Film ===
Title	Year	Role(s)	Notes
Alvin Rides Again	1974	Cleaning Lady	Feature film debut
Dimboola	1979	April	
Squizzy Taylor	1982	Woman in the Street	
Annie's Coming Out	1984	Mrs. Arnold	
Niel Lynne	1985	Old Woman	
Mull	1985	Fanny	
Frank's Chair	1990		
Spotswood	1992	Rose	
Duplex	1993	Elsie	
Say a Little Prayer	1993	Song Mimer	
The Heartreak Kid	1993	Lady on Stairs	
Angel Baby	1995	Elderly Patient	
Clippings	1995		
Falling	1995		
Park Street	1995		
Dead End	1999	Boarding House Woman	
Siam Sunset	1999	Dot	
A Telephone Call for Genevieve Snow	2000	Madame	
Bare	2000	Cast member	
Dalkeith	2002	Maisie Carter	
Crackerjack	2002	Mrs. Jenkins	
Forbidden	2003	Granma	Won – Tropfest Best Actor - Female
The Watch	2004	Opportunity Shop Lady	
Wally	2005	Granma	
Thirty Five Candles	2006		
Romulus, My Father	2007	Miss Collard	Nominated – Australian Film Institute Award for Best Actress in a Supporting Role
Hotel Motel	2007	Granny Crack	

=== Television ===
Title	Year	Role(s)	Notes
Consider Your Verdict	1963	unnamed	Television debut: "Queen Versus Burns" (guest appearance)
Division 4	1969–72	Mary Bentley, Mrs. Grey, Mrs.Gillespie, Mrs. McDougall	
Homicide	1970–75	Mrs. Smithers, Mrs. Carter, Emily, Kathleen Evans, Mrs. Grace, unnamed, Mama Stepanov	
Matlock Police	1971–74	Mrs. Butler, Mrs. Evans, Mrs. Stevens, Mrs. Williams, Mrs. Jenkins	
Ryan	1973	unnamed	
Bluey	1977	Mrs. Neilson, Old Woman	
Young Ramsay	1977	Mrs. McIver	
Prisoner	1980–86	Vera's Neighbour (uncredited), Freda, Beryl Hudson (2×), Charlady (2×), Granny Wilkinson (2×)	First repeat role: Beryl Hudson (1982) (guest appearance)
Holiday Island	1981	Nellie	
Special Squad	1984	unnamed, unnamed in "The Patchwork"	
The Flying Doctors	1986	Grace in "To the Rescue"	
Neighbours	1986, 1993, 2002, 2006	Annabelle York, Jean Halliday, Moina Beresford, Rose Belker	First ongoing role(s)
The Henderson Kids	1987	Old Lady in Series Two	
Sugar and Spice	1988	Mrs Watson	
Pugwall, Pugwall Summer	1989, 1991	Mary, Clara	
Phoenix	1992	Mrs. Butler in "A Bunch of Big Girls"	
Round the Twist	1993	Mrs. Gribble, senior in "Pink Bow Tie"	
The Damnation of Harvey McHugh	1994	Old Woman	
Wedlocked	1994	unnamed in "Dating Game"	
Blue Heelers	1994, 1998, 2001, 2003	Maude Keane in "Day in Court", "Damage Control"; Grace Burrell in "Stars in Their Eyes"; Amelia Dodds in "A Bit on the Side"; Elsie Wright in "A Blind Eye"	
Fast Forward Presents Full Frontal, Full Frontal	1995–96	additional cast	
Banjo Paterson's The Man from Snowy River	1996	Bobbe Berkovich	
Mercury	1996	Mrs. Keen	
Driven Crazy	1998	Mrs. Trapp	
Introducing Gary Petty	2000	Victim of Jude's Poetry in "The Flight Attendant Who Did Me Wrong"	
Stingers	2000	Old Lady	
SeaChange	2000	Ruby	
Eugénie Sandler P.I.	2000	Scottish Lady	
The Secret Life of Us	2001	Elderly Woman in "Better the Devil You Know"	
Bootleg	2002	Old Lady	
Short Cuts	2002	Mrs. Green in "Money or the Box", "My Funny Valentine", "Grass Is Greener"	
After the Deluge	2003	Edith	
Legacy of the Silver Shadow	2003	Older Woman	
Real Stories	2006	Gran on "Episode 2"	

== Theatre ==
Title	Year	Role(s)	Notes
	1939	unnamed	Theatre debut
	1956–1963		St Martins Theatre
Oliver!	1961–62, 1966–67	Mrs. Bedwin	Musical based on Oliver Twist by Charles Dickens
Little Women	1964		Musical based on Little Women and Good Wives by Louisa May Alcott
The Secretary Bird	1969	Mrs. Grey	Comedy
An Ideal Husband	1972		Comedy, drama
Rumpelstiltskin	1974	Aunty Flora Dora	Based on folk tales about Rumpelstiltskin as collected by Brothers Grimm
Morning Sacrifice	1989		Drama by Dymphna Cusack
Gilmore: A Portrait	1992		Biographical drama of Mary Gilmore by Eric Colladetti
Serendipity	1993		Drama
Waiting for Marlene	2000	Jessica	Review by Colin Donald, "The standout aspect of this play is the well-versed performance of Esme Melville as Jessica".
The Opportunity Shop	2003		Drama
Spell	2005		Drama

Credits:
