= Unicomb =

Unicomb is a surname. Notable people with the surname include:

- John Unicomb (1928–2012), Australian actor
- Matt Unicomb (born 1985), Australian basketball player
