= Neil Mansfield =

Australian director and writer

Neil Mansfield was an Australian film director and writer, known for his 1999 feature film Fresh Air. He began his career in the camera department at Film Australia and shot a number of music videos for Australian bands. After Fresh Air, he also directed the 2008 feature film Streetsweeper and a number of other projects. Mansfield lived in Woy Woy, where he died in December 2024.
