= The Love of Lionel's Life =

- Written by: Des Power; Tony Cavanagh
- Directed by: John Ruane
- Starring: Alex Dimitriades; Matt Day; Nadine Garner
- Country of origin: Australia
- Original language: English

Production
- Producers: Simone North; Tony Cavanagh
- Running time: 95 mins

Original release
- Release: 9 July 2000

The Love of Lionel's Life is an Australian film for television.

It was also known as Open Life.

== Cast ==
- Matt Day as Lionel
- Alex Dimitriades as Steve
- Nadine Garner as Lena
- Steven Vidler as Robbie
- Graeme Blundell as Stan
- Carol Burns as Mavis
- Heather Mitchell as Detective Sergeant
- Chris Betts
- Paul Denny as Darren
- Catherine Miller
- Chris Anderson
- Jean-Marc Russ

== Production ==
The film was partly financed by the Film Finance Corporation and screened on Channel Ten.
