= Mat Stevenson =

Australian actor

- Born: 15 April 1969 (age 57); Melbourne, Victoria, Australia
- Other name: Matthew Stevenson
- Occupation: Television actor
- Years active: 1985–present
- Children: 2 (including Grace Hyland)

Mathew "Mat" Stevenson (born 15 April 1969) is an Australian actor, known for his TV roles in soap operas and miniseries. He is best known for his role as Adam Cameron in TV soap opera Home and Away.

== Career ==
Stevenson made his debut in the TV film Breaking Up. He is best known for his role as Adam Cameron in Home and Away which he starred in from 1989 to 1994, making a return appearance in 1999. Prior to Home and Away, Stevenson played the part of "Skinner", a treacherous petty criminal whom Todd Landers had befriended on Network Ten's Neighbours.

In between acting, Mat was also a Team Leader for Telstra BigPond Technical Support at TeleTech.

In 2010, Stevenson appeared in three episodes of Network Ten's Rush as Inspector Cox. His other television roles have included Blue Heelers, MDA, City Homicide and Offspring.

== Personal life ==
Prior to his acting career, Stevenson worked as a swimming pool cleaner.

In August 2025, Stevenson spoke with The Sydney Morning Herald telling them before he scored his role on Neighbours, he was interested in starting a career as a real estate agent. He attended a business presentation, where he was drugged and raped by two men.

After leaving Home & Away in 1994, he lost everything and became homeless within a year of his departure.

He is the father of internet celebrity and transgender rights activist Grace Hyland.

== Filmography ==
=== Film ===
Title	Year	Roles	Type
1985	Breaking Up	Mark Wheeler	TV movie
2010	Animal Kingdom	PSG Doors (uncredited)	Feature film

=== Television ===
Title	Year	Roles	Type
1986	My Brother Tom	Kevin Connor	TV miniseries
1988	Dusty		TV series
1988–1989	Neighbours	Skinner	TV series, Recurring, 15 episodes
1989–1994, 1999	Home and Away	Adam Cameron	TV series, 518 episodes, Regular
2000	All Saints	Matt Booker	TV series, 1 episode
1995	Blue Heelers	Terry Walsh	TV series, Guest, 1 Episode
2001	Blue Heelers	Neil Morrison	TV series, Guest, 1 episode
2003	MDA	Cliff Mason	TV series, Guest, 1 episode
2009	City Homicide	Bill Penning	TV series, Guest, 1 episode
2010	Offspring	Sergeant Reid	TV series, Guest, 1 episode
2010	Burlesque	Director	
2010	Rush	Inspector Cox	TV series, Guest, 3 episodes
2013	Miss Fisher's Murder Mysteries	Pat O'Farrell	TV series, Guest, 1 episode
2014	Fat Tony & Co.	Police Prosecutor	TV miniseries, Guest, 1 episode
2014	Party Tricks	Farming Manager	TV miniseries, Guest, 1 episode
2020	Informer 3838	Police Van Driver	TV miniseries, Guest, 1 episode
2021	A Small Punch in a Little Town	Mike	
2022	Talking Prisoner	Self	
2024	Hard Yakka	Mat	Tv series, Guest, 2 episodes
2025	Serenity	Scruff	Short
