= A Case of Honor =

- Directed by: Eddie Romero
- Written by: John Trayne; William Hellinger
- Produced by: Antony I. Ginnane; Rod S.M. Confesor
- Starring: Timothy Bottoms; John Phillip Law
- Cinematography: Jose Batac Jr.
- Edited by: Toto Natividad
- Music by: William Motzing
- Production companies: Eastern Film Management Corporation; International Film Management
- Release date: 1989
- Running time: 89 minutes
- Countries: Philippines; Australia
- Language: English

A Case of Honor is a 1989 war drama film directed by Eddie Romero.

== Plot ==
A group of American prisoners of war still held captive in Vietnam are informed they are to be taken to the Soviet Union for unknown reasons. Perplexed and despondent, the group places their fate into the hands of Sgt Case, a devout Christian regarded by both his peers and the Vietnamese as a lunatic. Case leads his friends into a Divine inspired escape with several surprises in store.

== Cast ==
- Timothy Bottoms as Sgt. Joseph 'Hard' Case
- John Phillip Law as Capt. Roger L. Barnes
- Candy Raymond as Charlene 'Charlie' Delibes
- Nick Nicholson as Pops
- Brent Venables as Grissom
- Jeff Griffith as Luke
- Steve Rogers as Bondano
- Lucien Van as Lt. Col. Khe Trang
- Nigel Hogge as Col. Paul Gevanova
