= Hugh Stuckey =

Australian comedy writer (1928–2018)

Hugh Clifford Stuckey (1 July 1928 – 21 June 2018) was an Australian comedy and drama screenwriter, with credits writing for television, film, radio and commercials both locally and in the United Kingdom and the US. He was also a published author, playwright, radio broadcaster, actor, and Victorian baseballer.

Having started writing for In Melbourne Tonight in 1957, he was one of Australia's first television comedy writers. He wrote for Australian productions A Country Practice, Blue Heelers, Hey Dad..!, Neighbours, and The Restless Years, and wrote various shows for stars Bert Newton, Frankie Howerd, and others. He also wrote for British shows, including The Two Ronnies, Dave Allen at Large, and The Bill, and American productions such as I Dream of Jeannie and Bewitched.

Stuckey was a life member of the Australian Writers' Guild, having been a founding member. He presided as the group's vice president for many years. He lectured at the Film and Television School and RMIT, mentoring the next generation of writers.

== Early life and education ==
Hugh Clifford Stuckey was born on 1 July 1928 at the Ellesmere Hospital, Ormond, Victoria, Australia, the son of Linda Stuckey and Australian baseballer Hubert Stuckey. He was born during the Great Depression, which had a large impact on the Stuckey family.

In 1942, at 14 years old, Stuckey secured his first radio spot as a comedian for a weekly variety show called Kiddies Kapers. In 1943, at the age of 15 and under pressure by his father, he finished his studies at Melbourne High School and started working at Australian Paper Manufacturers (APM), now named Paperlinx. Hubert had chosen APM for Hugh to work for, as they had survived the Great Depression and could offer Hugh a secure job for life.

== Career ==
Stuckey, however found little interest in his job at APM, focusing his attention on performing live on stage and radio after hours. During World War II, he performed in 350 performances for the Australian troops in a comedy routine. In 1946, he received his first writing credit for a five-minute sketch for ABC Radio. In 1947, he wrote several gags for Radio 3DB's show Happy Gang.

Still working full-time at APM, for 26 weeks he wrote for the Macquarie Radio Network's 3AW station for a weekly sitcom Monty's Caberet.

In 1954, much to his father's disappointment, Stuckey quit his job at APM and left Melbourne with his new wife Shirley and took up a writing role for The Cadbury Show that would run for over 300 episodes.

His writing career developed as he began writing for well known actors at the time such as Jack Davey, George Wallace Snr and Willie Fennell.

In 1957, the year after television was introduced to Australia, Stuckey was hired as a comedy writer for Sydney Tonight. In 1958, he was appointed head writer for the highly successful In Melbourne Tonight, which was hosted by Graham Kennedy on Melbourne's GTV9 (now part of the Nine Network. After the Reg Grundy Organisation was founded in 1959, Stuckey would find regular work on the many programs the company would produce in the following decades.

In 1962, Stuckey moved on to write for The Delo & Daly Show, a comedy variety show hosted by Americans Ken Delo and Jonathan Daly. Stuckey wrote 46 one-hour episodes of the show, which appeared on HSV7 (now Channel 7. With the support of Daly, Stuckey was granted a leave of absence by HSV7 to pursue writing and to gain experience in Hollywood. While in Hollywood, Stuckey was hired by Desilu Productions who gave him the experience to learning directly from the writers of The Dick Van Dyke Show, The Danny Thomas Show and The Andy Griffith Show

After returning to Australia and fulfilling his contract with The Delo & Daly Show, Stuckey moved to HSV, now Seven Network, in 1963. He was hired to devise and produce a daytime series that ran five one-hour episodes per week. The series, Time for Terry, was hosted by English comedian Terry O'Neill.

In 1966, Stuckey was hired by Melbourne television station ATV0 (now ATV10, part of Network Ten, as a writer and producer of The Jimmy Hannan Show, hosted by 1965 Gold Logie winner Jimmy Hannan.

The well-known English comedian and actor Tony Hancock was contracted to play the starring role in an intended 13-part early color television series to be called Terra Australis for the Seven Network. Stuckey was the head writer for the sitcom series about a complaining British migrant, but referred to his work on this show as being less of a writer and more of a minder for the deeply depressed and alcoholic Hancock. On 24 June 1968, after the first three episodes were recorded without audiences in ATN7 Sydney, Hancock committed suicide. The Seven Network later showed this unfinished work as The Tony Hancock Special, which finally aired on 25 January 1972 and has since appeared on DVD.

Stuckey and his first wife Shirley were both deeply saddened by the death of Hancock, which prompted a move shortly after his death to the US. Based in Los Angeles, Stuckey found work with the sitcoms Bewitched, The Flying Nun, and I Dream of Jeannie. He also wrote sketch comedy material for Rowan & Martin's Laugh In.

In 1975, Stuckey signed his first contract in the UK with BBC London, where he wrote for The Two Ronnies, Dave Allen at Large, The Dick Emery Show and comedy star Frankie Howerd.

Stuckey returned to Australia, where he wrote for numerous tonight shows which were hosted by Stuart Wagstaff, Noel Ferrier, Tommy Leonetti, Bert Newton and others.

Stuckey became the story editor and episode writer for 45 one-hour episodes of the hit Channel 7 television drama A Country Practice, which won Logie Awards.

During his time writing for A Country Practice, Stuckey began a side project with director William Fitzwater, inspired by his personal interest in opera. At a young age, a friend of Stuckey's father introduced him to opera, which became a life passion. Stuckey and Fitzwater shared the vision of introducing opera to children and together created 13 episodes of The Maestro's Company. This was Australia's first ever show featuring both puppets and live actors, and was released in 1984. In the mid-1980s, Stuckey began writing for Neighbours and for The Restless Years as story editor and script editor.

In 1992, after finishing with A Country Practice, Stuckey moved back to England to write for police drama The Bill, Moon and Son and Frankie's On, starring Frankie Howerd.

By 1993, Stuckey found himself back in Australia writing for the animation The Adventures of Blinky Bill and Blue Heelers. He then returned to writing for Neighbours as story editor.

== Book ==
In 1959, Stuckey wrote the book My Mate Charlie, a fictional comedic novel based on his father and his father's best friend (from whom Hugh got his middle name). The book was published by Horwitz Publications and featured on In Melbourne Tonight, with host Graham Kennedy recommending it to his viewers.

== Awards ==
During the 1970s, J.C. Williamson Theatres Limited held a competition whereby the winner was guaranteed production of their winning play. Stuckey and writing partner Jack Brown won the competition with their murder mystery Over My Dead Body. They were paid the £5000 award money but shortly after winning the prize, J.C. Williamson Theatre Ltd went bankrupt and the play was never performed.

In 2005, Stuckey was awarded the Fred Parsons Award for his contribution to Australian comedy.

== Australian Writers' Guild ==
In 1962, Stuckey was one of the founding members of the Australian Writers' Guild. He served as national vice-president under the presidency of renowned playwright David Williamson.
