= Mull (film) =

- Directed by: Don McLennan
- Written by: Bron Nicholls; Jon Stephens
- Produced by: Antony I. Ginnane; Howard Grigsby
- Starring: Nadine Garner; Bill Hunter; Sue Jones; Mary Coustas; Juno Roxas
- Cinematography: Zbigniew Friedrich
- Edited by: Zbigniew Friedrich
- Music by: Michael Atkinson
- Production company: Ukiyo Films
- Distributed by: International Film Management World Releasing Inc
- Release date: 1988
- Running time: 92 minutes
- Country: Australia
- Language: English
- Budget: A$3 million

Mull is a 1988 Australian drama film directed by Don McLennan. The film is based on the popular 1986 book, Mullaway by Bronwen 'Bron' Nichols.

== Plot ==
A sixteen-year-old teenage girl (Nadine Garner) is forced to care for her family, when her mother (Sue Jones) finds out she is dying of Hodgkin’s disease. The family consists of her father (Bill Hunter) a reformed alcoholic and recently born-again Christian, her heroin-dabbling closet gay older brother (Craig Morrison), and two trying younger siblings (Bradley Kilpatrick and Kymara Stowers) all packed into a rented flat in the Melbourne bayside suburb of St Kilda. She also has to deal with her pregnant Greek best friend (Mary Coustas), her yearnings for her brother’s lover (Juno Roxas) and her gay former schoolteacher plus his lover.

== Cast ==
Main cast
Actor/actress	Character
Nadine Garner	Phoebe Mullens
Bill Hunter	Frank Mullens
Sue Jones	Deborah Mullens
Craig Morrison	Steven Mullens
Bradley Kilpatrick	Allan Mullens
Kymara Stowers	Jodie Mullens
Dominic Sweeney	Jim
Juno Roxas	Guido
Esme Melville	Fanny
Gerard Maguire	Dr. Graham
Mary Coustas	Helen
Monty Maizels	Don
Nick Giannopoulos	George
David Cameron	Larry
Bruce Langdon	Paul
Vince Jones	jazz singer

== Production ==
The film's budget was $3 million but McLennan says only $1.7 million went on the film, the rest went into fees.

== Awards ==
Mull received six nominations at the 1988 Australian Film Institute Awards: 'Best Film', 'Best Director' (McLennan), 'Best Actress' (Garner), 'Best Supporting Actress' (for both Jones and Coustas) and 'Best Costume Design' (Jeanie Cameron). Nadine Garner winning the 'Best Actress' award.

The film was also screened at the 33rd Regus London Film Festival in 1989.
