= Fresh Air (film) =

- Directed by: Neil Mansfield
- Written by: Neil Mansfield
- Produced by: Rosemary Blight
- Starring: Nadine Garner; Bridie Carter
- Production company: RB Films
- Release date: 5 May 1999
- Running time: 87 minutes
- Country: Australia
- Language: English
- Budget: $1 million
- Box office: A$10.050 (Australia)

Fresh Air is a 1999 Australian film directed by Neil Mansfield and produced by Rosemary Blight, starring Marin Mimica, Nadine Garner and Bridie Carter. Set over one week in July 1998, the film tells the story of Jack, Kit and E, three housemates who live together in the Sydney suburb of Marrickville. The narrative is based on a zine within the film called Pretty Ugly made by one of the characters, and is presented non-chronologically in an editing style inspired by zine culture that Mansfield called "zinema."

== Plot summary ==
The film takes place over one week in July 1998, but does not consistently present the narrative chronologically. This is an approximation of events.

As Fresh Air begins, Kit (Nadine Garner) and Jack (Marin Mimica) are a couple in their late 20s living in Marrickville. Jack has just lost his job and has a week remaining at the office. Their friend, E (Bridie Carter), is about to move in with them. E is making the latest issue of her zine, Pretty Ugly, which chronicles "a week in Marrickville... everyday life is art." Scenes of E making the zine and Jack photocopying it at work are interspersed throughout the film, including pages titled with days of the week, but these do not necessarily signify what day it is within the narrative.

On Sunday, Kit suggests to Jack that he should be a filmmaker but he reacts cynically. They drive in Kit's old VW Beetle to E's father's seaside mansion to help her move out. During the Lotto results, Jack gets up on the house roof to adjust the TV antenna. While Kit watches the Lotto results, she cuts her bangs. Kit and E go off to meet their friend Joey (Chrissy Ynfante) at "The Garage" while Jack stays up late to watch the World Cup.

On Monday, Kit is working at her job stacking shelves at a local supermarket and Jack goes to a local barber, Vince (Francesco Caudullo), for a shave. Vince suggests that Jack should take a holiday. Kit reflects that butchers seem to be happy people, and works on some new paintings for an upcoming exhibition. Over dinner, Jack wonders if he has wasted his life and the three housemates discuss paths forward.

On Tuesday, Kit and E drink coffee in the backyard and make plans to see Joey's band, Dirt. (It is later revealed they have changed their name to "the dirt!") Jack then goes to visit his parents, Bob (Tony Barry) and Joan (Julie Hamilton), before Bob's upcoming hospital admission. Jack asks them what they'd do if they won Lotto, and they demur. E gives Jack the latest copy of Pretty Ugly to photocopy at work. Kit reflects on the difference between pool and snooker. At work, she runs into an old friend, Hunter (Simon Lyndon) and goes on an awkward lunch date with him, learning that he has become rich from a career in advertising. Jack returns home having printed 50 copies of the zine for E. Kit tells Jack they should make time to clear out the spare room so that a fourth housemate can move in. Kit rehearses for a play in which she is playing accordion, and she and Jack go out for dinner while E practices drums at home. While attempting to kill a spider that has come into the car, Jack smashes the front headlight.

On Wednesday, E meets Kit at a café and introduces her to Brett (Michael Angus), who is practicing martial arts. Kit reflects that she feels "stuck in a long queue" and discusses her lunch date with Hunter from the previous day. That evening, Jack returns home with his parents' dog, Rex, and their barbecue strapped to the roof. E begins editing a film to show at Kit's exhibition.

On Thursday, Rex picks up a lit firework off the street. Jack manages to wrest it from his mouth and deposit the firework in a postbox, running away before it explodes. Kit receives a rejection from the Arts Council in the mail, and mentions that she sent her latest application off earlier that morning in the postbox across the street. She talks to Jack about her artistic ambitions and need for recognition, and mentions again that he has given up on his filmmaking. That night, Jack and Kit attend a house party. Kit discusses plans to attend two protests on Saturday - one against noise pollution from Sydney Airport, and another against cars.

On Friday, Kit and E swap stories about things they have seen throughout the week as they play Boggle. E gets her clothes washed at a laundromat then goes to a tattooist, where all her clothes are stolen. Kit visits Bob in hospital, without Jack. She mentions in passing that Jack is busy because it's his "last week" at work, and Bob and Joan seem not to know that he has been fired. Jack sits in on a studio session for the band "the dirt!" and falls asleep. Kit's exhibition opens, but few attend as the invitations were not sent out on time by the gallery. Jack does not attend, which disappoints Kit. E's film is screened to a small audience but she does not attend either, spending the night practicing bass in Jack's clothes. Hunter is one of the few people to show up, gifting E with a large sunflower. Jack comes home late and is apologetic when he realises he forgot about the exhibition.

On Saturday, Kit plays soccer with Rex at the Canterbury Velodrome in the morning. Kit and E then attend the protest at Sydney Airport, throwing paper planes and blowing whistles in the departure lounge. Meanwhile, Jack helps film a commercial, and acquires a large ceramic statue of Mother Mary. Later, he turns up to the hospital to visit Bob and finds out he's already been discharged. Returning to his parents' home and dropping off Rex, he chats to Bob who mentions "All I needed was a breath of fresh air."

Kit and E then attend the "Carmageddon" protest where Kit finds that Jack has given her VW Beetle car away to be smashed up by attendees. Kit decides to break up with him, but is brought around when Jack turns up to her play. He gifts E with the Mary statue and Kit with a small ceramic cow. He also tells Kit he plans to go on the dole, and make a new film. Kit then plays accordion in a band at a Carmageddon benefit show, but the set is interrupted by a power failure.

As the film ends, Kit and E excitedly talk about having seen the Concorde fly over earlier that day, to which Jack expresses surprise because they had just attended a protest against the airport. Kit and E respond that the Concorde is "different." Meanwhile, at a local kebab shop, a newspaper headline reveals that this week there has been no Lotto winner.

== Cast ==
- Marin Mimica as Jack
- Nadine Garner as Kit
- Bridie Carter as E
- Simon Lyndon as Harrison
- Tony Barry as Bob
- Julie Hamilton as Joan
- Russell Kiefel as Preacher

== Production ==
Film poster for Static Electricity, Mansfield's recut of Fresh Air released in 2020.

Mansfield was working at Film Australia and working on the script. It began as a purely visual comedy, "then I started working in dialogue and it took off from there," said Mansfield. "In the final stages of development, we worked on bridging the kitchen sink drama with the observational comedy."

Mansfield showed the script to Rosemary Blight who liked it and decided to produce it. "I first read it on the bus between Broadway and Newtown," Blight said, "and I couldn’t stop laughing. It was very observant of people – in fact, some of the characters seemed to be on the same bus with me… He’s very observant…his view of the world is very different. In other scripts, you see people larger than life, but he sees them as they are."

"I'm interested in underachievement," said Mansfield. "I'm interested in underdogs. The film is loaded up with scenes in which I don't tell the audience how to think."

Mansfield wrote 12 drafts of the script. It eventually got some finance through the New Screenwriters Scheme of the NSW Film and TV Office, through which Bill Bennett agreed to mentor Mansfield. Then the film attracted support from Bridgit Ikin, head of SBS Independent, and Marion Pilowski, Head of Acquisitions and Program Development at Premium Movie Partnership (Foxtel) who supported the film's successful application to be one of the five "Million Dollar Movies" jointly financed by the Australian Film Commission and SBS Independent. Funding was announced in December 1997. (The others would include Mallboy, Bored Olives, A Wreck A Tangle.)

Mansfield called the film "'zinema'... a wanky excuse for a cut and paste style. Zine as in home made, non-profit sort of magazine. It’s expressionistic in style but naturalistic in content."

Cinematographer Toby Oliver said the film uses "wobblycam, and a fragmented jump cut style, but also some scenes are very static with no camera movement, or there may be an elaborate dolly set up. We are also using photos and words sprinkled through the film. "

== Release ==
Fresh Air screened at the Rotterdam Film Festival in January 1999 before its Australian premiere at Dendy Newtown on 5 May 1999. It screened there for an exclusive season before expanding to other Sydney cinemas. A director's cut was also screened in 2000. The film was later released on VHS. It has never been officially reissued on DVD or streaming since. In 2020, during the COVID-19 lockdowns, Mansfield re-edited the film and created a new cut under the title Static Electricity. Some screenings were held, but it has not been publicly released either.

== Soundtrack ==
The soundtrack CD was released on Festival Records, featuring music by independent and underground Australian artists. "Hit the Sky" by Screamfeeder featuring Kim Bowers (of Spdfgh) was also released as a single. In the liner notes, Mansfield describes the soundtrack as "prog folk pop jazz funk rock and somehow perfect... You ask a motley crew of outsider musicians to write and perform some original music for your low budget film and this is what you get."

== Critical reception ==
Fresh Air was positively received in Australia. On The Movie Show, David Stratton reviewed the film favourably, calling it "rather effective, surprisingly romantic at times, very atmospheric, with great use of music and lots of youthful energy". Margaret Pomeranz was less enthusiastic, wondering if the film might have been better as a short, and adding that it had a "fairly inaccessible originality... I mean, I feel it’s a real generation of film of which I am not a part." In The Sydney Morning Herald, Garry Maddox called the film "an innovative feature that celebrates the underachiever". Paul Byrnes, also of the Herald, called the film "quietly charming" with a tone "never quite wholly satirical, nor wholly serious". Tom Ryan in The Age praised the "intriguing mix of the mundane and the exotic (that) delivers something of the exotic flavour of an inner-suburban Australian neighbourhood", adding that the film "leaves you wanting a sequel". One negative review came from Adrian Martin, who said that the film "jerks from one uninteresting tableau or banal witticism to the next (and) apart from a few amusing or poignant scenes, fails to entice or intrigue the spectator in any way." Jim Schembri also felt that the film's "exaggerated camera angles, collages, frenetic editing and playful disregard for linear narrative... (would be praiseworthy) if it wasn't so monumentally boring."
