= I've Married a Bachelor =

- Genre: Sitcom
- Written by: Lyle Martin
- Directed by: Brian Bell
- Starring: Peter Whitford; June Thody; Aileen Britton; Donald MacDonald
- Music by: Laurie Lewis
- Country of origin: Australia
- Original language: English
- No. of series: 2
- No. of episodes: 14

Production
- Executive producer: Alan Morris
- Producer: Brian Bell
- Production locations: Sydney, Australia
- Running time: 30 minutes

Original release
- Network: ABC-TV
- Release: 29 October 1968 – 14 May 1969

I've Married a Bachelor is an Australian television sitcom that first screened on the ABC in 1968. It won the Logie Award for Best Comedy at the Logie Awards of 1968.

== Cast ==
- Peter Whitford as Peter Prentice
- June Thody as Molly Prentiss
- Aileen Britton as Mrs Malley
- Donald MacDonald as Mervyn MacGregor

== See also ==
- List of Australian television series
- Newlyweds
