= Bradley Kilpatrick =

Australian army officer and former actor

Colonel Bradley Kilpatrick CSC AM
- Born: 1973 or 1974 (age 52–53)
- Allegiance: Australia
- Branch: Australian Army
- Service years: 1993-present
- Rank: Colonel
- Conflicts: 1999 East Timorese crisis Iraq War; War in Afghanistan
- Awards: Commander Joint Operations Commendation; United States Meritorious Medal; Conspicuous Service Cross; Member of the Order of Australia
- Education: University of New South Wales (MPhil, 2016)
- Notable work: Breaking Up (1985); Mull (1988)
- Television: The Henderson Kids (1985); Neighbours (1986); Saturdee(1986); The Henderson Kids II (1987)

Colonel Bradley Scott Kilpatrick CSC AM (born 1973 or 1974) is an Australian army officer and former actor.

== Acting career ==
Throughout the 1980's, Kilpatrick worked as a child actor. His most notable role was that of Brian "Brains" Buchanan in the 1985 Network Ten drama The Henderson Kids, where he appeared alongside Kylie Minogue.

In 1986, he reunited with Minogue when they both appeared in the Network Ten soap Neighbours where Minogue played Charlene Mitchell with Kilpatrick completing a four-month guest role playing spoiled brat Bradley Townsend.

Also in 1986, Kilpatrick played Milky in the Seven Network children's drama Saturdee which was based on the 1933 novel by Norman Lindsay.

In 1987, he reprised his role as Brian "Brains" Buchanan in The Henderson Kids II.

Prior to The Henderson Kids, Kilpatrick played a character called Tommy Kipman in three 1986 episodes of Prisoner. He also appeared in a 1988 episode of The Flying Doctors.

Kilpatrick's film credits include the 1985 movie Breaking Up and the 1988 film Mull, the latter of which saw him reunite with his The Henderson Kids co-star Nadine Garner.

== Military career ==
After graduating from high school, Kilpatrick entered the Royal Military College at Duntroon in 1992.

Kilpatrick graduated to the Royal Australian Armoured Corps in 1993 with his first posting being troop leader with the 2nd Cavalry Regiment in 1994.

From 1994 to 2005, Kilpatrick served in a variety of regimental postings within the 2nd Cavalry Regiment and B Squadron 3rd/4th Cavalry Regiment as a personnel officer, Squadron Second-in-Command, Operations Officer and Commanding Officer.

Kilpatrick completed operational deployments to East Timor, Bosnia, Iraq and Afghanistan. In his 1999 East Timor posting, he was Second in Command of B Squadron 3rd/4th Cavalry Regiment. He then served in Bosnia in 2003 with the 1st Battalion Royal Scots before serving as Operations Officer of the Al Muthanna Task Group in Iraq in 2005. Kilpatrick then served as the Deputy Director of the Counter Insurgency Training Centre in Afghanistan in 2009.

On 21 December 1999, the Tour of Duty – Concert for the Troops was held in Dili for Australian service personnel. Kilpatrick is credited with securing the appearance of his former The Henderson Kids and Neighbours co-star Kylie Minogue, who performed alongside other Australian artists such as John Farnham, Gina Jeffreys, James Blundell and The Living End.

Prior to the concert, Kilpatrick and Minogue were photographed by visual artist Matthew Sleeth in Balibo on 20 December 1999 while Minogue held an Australian Army Steyr rifle. The photograph was featured as part of Sleeth's "Tour of Duty Winning Hearts and Minds" series and was exhibited at the Centre for Contemporary Photography in Melbourne.

In 2000, Kilpatrick was one of the 50 nominees for the title of Cleo Bachelor of the Year, which was ultimately won by rugby league player Craig Wing. On his nomination, Kilpatrick stated: "It's good to have a regular guy in the running and I think it's great someone from the army is in there."

Throughout his career, Kilpatrick has served as a military instructor, senior instructor of war fighting and deputy chief instructor at the Royal Military College.

From 2011 until 2013, Kilpatrick was the commanding officer and chief instructor of the Australian Defence Force Academy. In 2018, he returned to the Australian Defence Force Academy to serve two years as deputy commandant.

In 2021, he commenced an appointment as Assistant Chief of Staff of Forces Command.

While serving with the Australian Army, Kilpatrick graduated from Deakin University in 2006 with a Bachelor of Arts. In 2016 became a Master of Philosophy at the University of New South Wales with his thesis researching the design and implementation of adolescent learning strategies based on cognitive neuroscience and educational psychology.

He assisted in the response to the first phase of the review into the treatment of women at the Australian Defence Force Academy, led by Sex Discrimination Commissioner Elizabeth Broderick.

In 2023, Kilpatrick had an essay published in the Australian Army Journal entitled "The Design and Implementation of a Youth Learning Framework within an Ab Initio Officer Training Academy".

== Honours ==
For his service in Iraq, Kilpatrick was awarded a Commander Joint Operations Commendation.

For his service in Afghanistan, he was awarded a United States Meritorious Medal.

For the training solutions he implemented in response to the Broderick Review's recommendations, Kilpatrick was awarded the Conspicuous Service Cross in the 2014 Queen's Birthday Honours in recognition of his "outstanding achievement as the Chief Instructor in the Undergraduate Branch of the Australian Defence Force Academy".

In the 2025 King's Birthday Honours, Kilpatrick was made a Member in the military division of the Order of Australia "for exceptional service in the fields of governance, sensitive issues management and Defence adolescent learning".
