= Grace Hyland =

Australian internet celebrity

- Occupations: Internet personality LGBTQ rights activist
- Years active: 2019–present
- Parent: Mat Stevenson (father)

Instagram information
- Page: Grace Hyland
- Followers: 231 K

TikTok information
- Page: grace.hylandd
- Followers: 800.4K
- Last updated: 28 September 2026

Grace Elizabeth Stevenson, known professionally as Grace Hyland, is an Australian internet personality and LGBTQ rights activist. Hyland rose to prominence on the social media platform TikTok, and has also amassed a large following on Instagram and OnlyFans. She is the daughter of television actor Mat Stevenson.

== Biography ==
Hyland is the daughter of Australian actor Mat Stevenson, who starred in the TV serial Home and Away as Adam Cameron.

When Hyland was twelve years old, she came out to her family as a transgender woman; first to her stepmother and then to her father, mother, and sister. An advocate for hormone blockers for transgender youth, Hyland stated that she went to a gender clinic for a year before being allowed to start hormone replacement therapy. She publicly changed her name to Grace when she was fourteen years old.

In 2020, Hyland amassed a large social media following, with 575,000 followers on TikTok and 145,000 on Instagram, where she uploads videos about life as a transgender woman. She uses her online platform to address issues pertaining to transgender people, and answering questions about the experiences of transgender people.

In January 2021, Hyland and her father appeared on The Sunday Project to talk about their experiences and issues facing transgender people in Australia.

Hyland is an aspiring actress and stated that she would like to play a transgender character in a television series.

== Personal life ==
She is a practicing Hindu.
