= Tribe (Australian TV series) =

1999 Australian mini series

- Written by: Jock Blair
- Directed by: George Miller
- Music by: Bruce Rowland
- Country of origin: Australia
- Original language: English

Production
- Producer: Jock Blair
- Running time: 240 minutes

Original release
- Network: Seven Network
- Release: 18 July – 19 July 1999

Tribe is a 1999 Australian TV mini-series. It was written and produced by Jock Blair and directed by George Miller. It was filmed over two months in Mission Beach, Dunk Island and Bedarra Island. Showing over two nights, it premiered on Seven on 18 July with a cast including Antonio Sabato Jnr, Craig McLachlan and Nadine Garner.

== Plot ==
A boat cruise is attacked by pirates leaving the survivors stranded on an island rigged with WWII booby traps. They must work to survive but one of them may not be on the same side.

== Cast ==
- Craig McLachlan as Ralph Leyton
- Joanna Cassidy as Gina Brava
- Antonio Sabato Jr as Jack Osborne
- Nadine Garner as Marie Sinclair
- Rachel Blakely as Lucille Fournier
- Ling Hsueh Tang as Minh-Tam
- Thaao Penghlis as Captain John Brava
- Lisa Callaghan as Sandy
- Beverley Dunn as Sister Margaret
- Paul Leyden as Andrew Jenkins
- Tayler Kane as Jacque Duras
