= Candy Raymond =

Australian actress (1950–2025)

- Born: Candida Raymond; 1950; Sydney, New South Wales, Australia
- Died: c. December 2025; Sydney, New South Wales, Australia
- Occupation: Actress
- Years active: 1967–2008

Candida Raymond (1950 – c. December 2025) was an Australian actress, most prominent in film and television during the 1970s and early 1980s.

== Early life and career ==
Raymond was born in Sydney in 1950 and attended St Ives High School.

As a teenager she played small guest roles in Australian television soap operas and TV series including Skippy (1969) and Riptide (1969). She also appeared in stage revues.

She attended NIDA in a class that included John Hargreaves, Wendy Hughes and Grigor Taylor.

In mid-1973, she played Jill Sheridan in Number 96. Her character was presented as a sex symbol in what was considered an adults only TV show, ultimately involving her in several controversial nude sequences. She then played a regular character in Class of '74.

In 1975, Raymond was a regular in a comic skit segment titled "The Checkout Chicks" which in turn was part of The Norman Gunston Show (1975).

She also appeared in a number of feature films, including Alvin Rides Again (1974), the attractive artist Kerry in Don's Party (1976), A Viennese school teacher in The Getting of Wisdom (1977), Money Movers (1978), The Journalist (1979), Freedom (1982) and Monkey Grip (1982).

In 1977 she appeared on The Zodiac Girls, a talk show about astrology.

She was also in stage productions of The Rocky Horror Show and Play It Again, Sam. As both actress and storyline writer, she played a Jewish escapee of Europe in the WWII based TV series The Sullivans (1980).

In 1981, she played imprisoned journalist Sandra Hamilton in the TV series Prisoner. That year she said she hoped to write and produce a feature.

In 1985, Raymond was involved in filming two television mini-series simultaneously in two different cities. In Sydney she filmed Shout! The Story of Johnny O'Keefe and in Melbourne she was involved in The Great Bookie Robbery which was released in 1986. She also starred in the ABC telefilm Breaking Up, playing a 30-something mother-of-two going through a marriage break-up. For this role, she later won an Australian Film Institute Award as best actress in a tele-movie or mini-series.

Through the 1980s and 1990s, Raymond was active as a voice artist for radio and television and occasionally appeared in dramatised educational films.

== Later career ==
Raymond's last feature film role was as a French-Vietnamese brothel madam in the action film A Case of Honor (1989), which was filmed on location in the Philippines.

She appeared as herself in the feature documentary Not Quite Hollywood: The Wild, Untold Story of Ozploitation! (2008), where she was interviewed about women in Australian films of the 1970s.

== Personal life and death ==
Raymond lived near Bowral. She was the sister of actress Victoria Raymond also of Number 96 fame as the second actress to play Bev Houghton after Abigail left the role. Raymond was active in animal rights, writing and occasionally participating in local theatre and music events.

On 1 January 2026, it was announced that Raymond had died at the age of 75.

== Filmography ==
=== Film ===
Year	Title	Role	Notes
1972	Shirley Thompson Versus the Aliens	Gang member	Feature film
1974	Alvin Rides Again	Girl in office	Tim Burstall Feature film
1976	Don's Party	Kerry	Bruce Beresford Feature film
1977	The Getting of Wisdom	Miss Zielinski	Bruce Beresford Feature film
1978	Money Movers	Mindel Seagers	Bruce Beresford Feature film
1979	The Journalist	Sunshine	Feature film
1982	Freedom	Annie	Feature film
1982	Monkey Grip	Lillian	Feature film
1989	A Case of Honor	Charlene 'Charlie' Delibes	Feature film, Philippines
2008	Not Quite Hollywood: The Wild, Untold Story of Ozploitation!	Herself	Feature film documentary

=== Television ===
Year	Title	Role	Type
1969	Riptide	Teenage Girl	TV series, 1 episode: "Jump High, Land Easy"
1969	Skippy	Georgie	TV series, 1 episode: "Plain Jane"
1971	Matlock Police	Helene	TV series, 1 episode: "The Gypsies"
1972	Division 4	Julie	TV series, 1 episode: "Birds of a Feather"
1973	Number 96	Jill Sheridan	TV series, 24 episodes Series regular in recurring role
1978	Class of '74	unknown role	
1974	Silent Number	Edy	TV series, 1 episode: "Day Cruise"
1975	The Norman Gunston Show	The Checkout Chicks sketch	ABC TV series, 6 episodes Regular role
1977	Bluey	Susan Martin	TV series, Episode 34: "Lonely Ordeal"
1977	Young Ramsay	April Kent	TV series Episode 3: "A Kid Is a Kid"
1978	Chopper Squad	Lindy	TV series, Episode 26: "Long Weekend"
1978–83	Cop Shop	Sally Pitman, Beth Harrison, Lynn Betts	TV series, 4 episodes Episodes: "1.148", "1.215", "1.216", "1.463"
1978	The Zodiac Girls	unknown role	TV pilot
1979	The Plumber	Meg	TV film
1980	The Sullivans	Rachele	TV series - 6 episodes
1980	Kingswood Country	Fiona Beaumont	TV series, 1 episode: "The Shares of the Fisherman"
1981	Cornflakes for Tea	Robin Hart	TV film
1981	Prisoner	Sandra Hamilton	TV series, 8 episodes Guest role
1982	MPSIB	Kuan Sadler	ABC TV series, 1 episode: "Death of a Ghost"
1985	Breaking Up		ABC TV movie
1985	Winners - The Other Facts of Life	Jean	TV film series
1986	Shout! The Story of Johnny O'Keefe	Maureen O'Keefe	TV miniseries, 2 episodes
1986	The Great Bookie Robbery	Sonya Reynolds	TV miniseries, 3 episodes
1986	The Movers	Sacha	TV film
1988	Hey Dad..!	Felicity Simpson-Green	TV series, episode: "The Love Triangle"
1988	The Flying Doctors	Joanne Wright	TV series, 2 episodes: "Repeat Performance", "One Final Request"
1989	Rafferty's Rules	Jean Robbins	TV series, 1 episode: "The Plague"
1995	Sale of the Century: Battle of The TV Classics	Herself	TV series, 1 episode
2004	Count Your Toes: The Making of 'Money Movers'	Herself	Video
2005	Crashing the Party: The Making of 'Don's Party'	Herself	Video
2006	Telling Schoolgirl Tales: The Making of 'The Getting of Wisdom'	Herself	Video
2008	Not Quite Hollywood: Deleted and Extended Scenes	Herself	Video

== Theatre ==
- Killara 360 Revue (1967)
- A Midsummer Night's Dream (1970) – Old Tote
- Blood Wedding (1970) – Old Tote
- Foursome (1975) – Seymour
- The Rocky Horror Show (1978)
- Sexual Perversity in Chicago (1980) – Nimrod
