= The Maestro's Company =

- Written by: Hugh Stuckey
- Directed by: William Fitzwater
- Starring: Justine Clarke; Adam Willits
- Country of origin: Australia
- Original language: English
- No. of seasons: 1
- No. of episodes: 13

Production
- Producer: Richard Davis
- Cinematography: Robert McDonnell
- Running time: 30 minutes

Original release
- Network: SBS
- Release: 13 January – 7 April 1985

The Maestro's Company is an Australian television series that originally aired on SBS in 1985. Conceived by Marcia Hatfield, it was designed to introduce children to opera.

== Synopsis ==
Two children stumble across an old theatre occupied by an opera company of puppets.

== Production ==
The show cost $1.3 million and featured puppets created by Beverley Campbell-Jackson, each costing $10,000. It features songs sung by real opera stars such as Dame Joan Sutherland, Placido Domingo and Renata Tebaldi. The song were taken from Decca recordings. The show was filmed in Balmain's Bijou Theatre.

== Cast ==
- Justine Clarke as Tina
- Adam Willits as Johnny

== Reception ==
Bronwyn Watson of the Sydney Morning Herald gave it a positive review stating "The Maestro's Company is a good mixture — it doesn't lose the flavour of the opera nor does it overdose on singing. I think it is a successful marriage between television and opera." Also in the Sydney Morning Herald Jacqueline Lee Lewes writes "As clever and refreshing the may be, Maestro's Company is definitely one for kids."

== Soundtrack ==
A double record soundtrack titled The Maestro's Company of Arias and Scenes from the operas featured in the TV series was released on Decca Jubilee.
