= Adrian Bauk =

Australian basketball player

Adrian Bauk (born 8 April 1985) is a former Australian professional basketball player who last played with the Sydney Kings, retiring at the end of the 2004/05 season. He won an NBL championship with the Kings in 2004 Sydney Kings Championships Era, playing 5 crucial games that led them to the championship.

As of 2013, Adrian was focusing his skills in the tech industry by launching a Pub Crawl app.
