= Breaking Up (1985 film) =

- Based on: Breaking Up by Frank Willmott
- Written by: Frank Willmott
- Directed by: Kathy Mueller
- Starring: Nick Enright; Mat Stevenson; Bradley Kilpatrick; Candy Raymond
- Country of origin: Australia
- Original language: English

Production
- Producer: Noel Price

Original release
- Network: ABC
- Release: 6 October 1985

Breaking Up is a 1985 TV movie about the breakdown of a marriage seen through the eyes of a child.

== Premise ==
Jackie and Alec break up. Their child struggles to deal with it.

== Cast ==
- Nick Enright as Alec
- Mat Stevenson as Mark
- Bradley Kilpatrick as Andy
- Candy Raymond as Jackie

== Production ==
The film was based on a 1983 juvenile literature novel by Frank Willmott which was written from the point of view of fifteen year old Mark. The book was a best seller.

== Reception ==
Bronwyn Watson in the Sydney Morning Herald's The Guide wrote "Written by Frank Willmott and directed by Kathy Mueller, Breaking Up is an excellent, yet rather distressing, production" and adds it is "also interesting because it is filmed from a teenager's perspective, rather than from an adult one."

== Awards ==
Candy Raymond's performance won her a 1986 AFI Award for Best Actress in a Telefeature.
