= Bang Goes the Budgie =

- Genre: children's
- Written by: Doug MacLeod; Jennifer Hooks; Jon Stephens; Tony Porter; Nancy Groll; Michael Vale
- Directed by: Jon Stephens; Tony Porter
- Starring: Janet Shaw; Andrew Coodone; Jeff Phillips; Carmelina Digiuglielmo
- Country of origin: Australia
- Original language: English
- No. of episodes: 13

Production
- Producers: Jon Stephens; Tony Porter; Jennifer Hooks; Richard Bence
- Running time: 25 minutes
- Production companies: Australian Children's Television Foundation; Richard Bence Productions Pty Ltd

Original release
- Network: ABC
- Release: 27 May – 19 August 1985

Bang Goes the Budgie was an Australian children's television series that first aired on ABC in 1985 and was broadcast for several years until 1991.

The series ran for one season and 13 episodes and was a production of the Australian Children's Television Foundation and distributed by Richard Bence Productions Pty Ltd.
