= Double Demon =

1930 Australian radio drama

- ABC Weekly 4 May 1951
- Genre: serial drama
- Running time: 30 mins (8:30 pm – 9:00 pm)
- Country of origin: Australia
- Language: English
- Syndicates: ABC
- Written by: Max Afford
- Original release: 6 May – 29 July 1951
- No. of series: 1
- No. of episodes: 13

Double Demon is a 1951 Australian radio serial by Max Afford featuring his detective hero, Jeffrey Blackburn. He wrote it after returning to Australia following a long trip to England, whereupon he signed a long-term contract with the ABC. This serial was one of the first results of that new arrangement.

According to ABC Weekly "it is the first time the Blackburns have travelled to Australia. It is also the first thriller, as far as Mr. Afford knows, in which the detective knows who the criminal is, but—coming from another country—has no legal status to act." (The plot involves the Blackburns travelling to Queensland.)

== Reception ==
The Melbourne Advocate, reviewing the first episode, said "The main fault" of the production "lay with production and acting, which were incredibly bad. The show might have been put on by the rawest bunch of amateurs getting their first chance on a country station. Characters were not clearly defined—some of the blame here, but by no means all, may be laid at the writer's door. His sturdy Australian, for instance, was a conventional stage caricature, but the landlady and her staff of freaks promise something better."
