= Matt Unicomb =

Australian basketball player

Personal information
- Born: 21 January 1985 (age 41) Hornsby, New South Wales
- Listed height: 6 ft 4 in (1.93 m)
- Listed weight: 205 lb (93 kg)

Career information
- Playing career: 2005–present
- Position: Guard

Matt Unicomb (born 21 January 1985) is an Australian former professional basketball player who played for the West Sydney Razorbacks in the Australian National Basketball League and Den Helder in the Dutch League.

In March 2018, Matt began playing out of Fitzrovia, London.
