= The Henderson Kids =

- Title card from the first season
- Genre: Drama
- Written by: Roger Moulton
- Directed by: Paul Moloney, Chris Langman
- Opening theme: "Carry on" by Chris Lloyds (instrumental)
- Ending theme: "Carry on" by Chris Lloyds
- Country of origin: Australia
- Original language: English
- No. of seasons: 2
- No. of episodes: 48

Production
- Production location: Birregurra, Victoria
- Running time: 60 minutes

Original release
- Network: Network Ten
- Release: 9 May 1985 – 29 August 1987

The Henderson Kids is an Australian television series made by Crawford Productions for Network Ten between 1985 and 1987. It was created and storylined by Roger Moulton, who also wrote 5 episodes in the first series and 2 episodes in the second series.

== Season one ==
=== Synopsis ===
The series follows teenage siblings Steve (Paul Smith) and Tamara (Nadine Garner). They are forced to leave the city and move to the country to live with their uncle Mike (Nicholas Eadie) after their mother Alice (Diane Craig) is hit by a truck and killed. Mike is a police officer in the fictional town of Haven Bay.

The Henderson kids make a new life in Haven Bay and make friends with the local gang. They were Ted Morgan (Ben Mendelsohn), Colin "Cowboy" Clarke (Mark Hennessy), Charlotte "Char" Kernow (Kylie Minogue) and Brian "Brains" Buchanan (Bradley Kilpatrick).

Steve and Tamara defend the family land, Henderson's Point, against the schemes of ruthless businessman Ashley Wheeler (Peter Whitford). To compound matters, Steve falls in love with Wheeler's daughter Sylvia (Annie Jones).

=== Cast ===
==== Main ====
- Paul Smith as Steve Henderson
- Nadine Garner as Tamara 'Tam' Henderson
- Ben Mendelsohn as Ted Morgan
- Kylie Minogue as Charlotte 'Char' Kernow
- Mark Hennessy as Colin 'Cowboy' Clarke
- Bradley Kilpatrick as Brian 'Brains' Buchanan
- Annie Jones as Sylvia Wheeler
- Peter Whitford as Ashley Wheeler
- Nicholas Eadie as Uncle Mike

==== Recurring and guests ====
- Antoinette Byron as Pat Edwards
- Jane Hall as Regina Powell
- Tottie Goldsmith as Glynnis Wheeler
- Kevin Harrington as Gazza
- Peter O'Brien as Suds
- Stefan Dennis as Terry
- Nicholas Creed as Trevor Cathcart
- Diane Craig as Alice Henderson (2 episodes)
- Reg Gorman as Kernow (4 episodes)
- Michael Aitkens as Walter 'Wal' Mullens
- Christopher Milne as Stan (2 episodes)

Garner, Mendelsohn, Minogue, Kilpatrick, Jones, Hall, Goldsmith, Harrington, O'Brien and Dennis all went on to appear in Neighbours.

=== Filming ===
The Haven Bay set footage was filmed in Birregurra, Victoria.

== Season two ==
=== Synopsis ===
A second series (called The Henderson Kids II), set in the fictional bayside suburb of Westport followed in 1987. This had Steve and Tamara living in the city again, with their father Walter "Wal" Mullens (Michael Aitkens). They had a new gang of friends, including Vincent "Vinnie" Cerantonio (Alex Papps) as the leader of the Brown Street Boys (a gang of local high school kids on BMX bikes), twins Carol (Anita Cerdic) and Marty Summers (Nathan Croft), and Brian "Brains" Buchanan and Trevor Cathcart (Nicholas Creed), both holdovers from the original series.

Other central characters were the Henderson's next door neighbours Helen Marshall (Louise Howitt) and her 9-year-old daughter Sally (Marieke Hardy), their dad's shady business partner Harry (Ross Thompson) and his henchman Spider (John Jacobs), Sergeant Javorsky (Doug Bowles) of the Victorian police, Brown Street Boy Mick Dalton (Paul Hall) and the Westport High School 'snob' Miranda Kilsyth (Elizabeth Rule).

=== Cast ===
==== Main ====
- Paul Smith as Steve Henderson
- Nadine Garner as Tamara 'Tam' Henderson
- Alex Papps as Vincent 'Vinnie' Cerantonio
- Anita Cerdic as Carol
- Nathan Croft as Marty Summers
- Bradley Kilpatrick as Brian 'Brains' Buchanan

==== Recurring and guests ====
- Michael Aitkens as Walter 'Wal' Mullens
- Louise Howitt as Helen Marshall
- Marieke Hardy as Sally
- Mary Ward as Mrs Cathcart
- Nicholas Creed as Trevor Cathcart
- Ross Thompson as Harry
- John Jacobs as Spider
- Doug Bowles as Sergeant Javorsky
- Paul Hall as Mick Dalton
- Elizabeth Rule as Miranda Kilsyth
- Khym Lam as Anh Nguyen

=== Filming ===
The Westport footage was filmed in Williamstown, Melbourne.

== Awards ==
Actress Nadine Garner won a Logie Award in 1985, and a Television Society of Australia Penguin Award (1987) for her portrayal of Tamara Tam" Henderson.

== Home media ==
A total of 24 episodes were produced. In 2007 Madman Entertainment released two 3-DVD sets of the series: The Henderson Kids (series one) and The Henderson Kids II. The DVD extras are a 13-minute TV promo for series 1 on the first The Henderson Kids DVD set and a short "goof reel" from series two on the DVD set The Henderson Kids II.

DVD name	Format	Ep #	Discs/Tapes	Region 4 (Australia)	Special features	Distributors
The Henderson Kids I	DVD	24	3	2007	13-minute TV promo for series 1 on the first	Madman Entertainment
The Henderson Kids II	DVD	24	3	2007	Short Goof Real	Madman Entertainment
The Henderson Kids I	DVD	24	3	2012	N/A	Crawford Productions
The Henderson Kids II	DVD	24	3	2012	N/A	Crawford Productions

== International broadcasts ==
Both series were screened in the UK during 1989 on Channel 4.

The whole series was screened in New Zealand on TVNZ. The first season aired on Fridays from 13 February to 1 May 1987 , followed by the second season which aired from 24 July to 9 October 1987.

The series aired Sunday evenings at 7:30 pm on GBC TV in Gibraltar where the series found much success, becoming the topic of conversation every Monday morning in schools.
