= Nadine Garner =

Australian actor (born 1970)

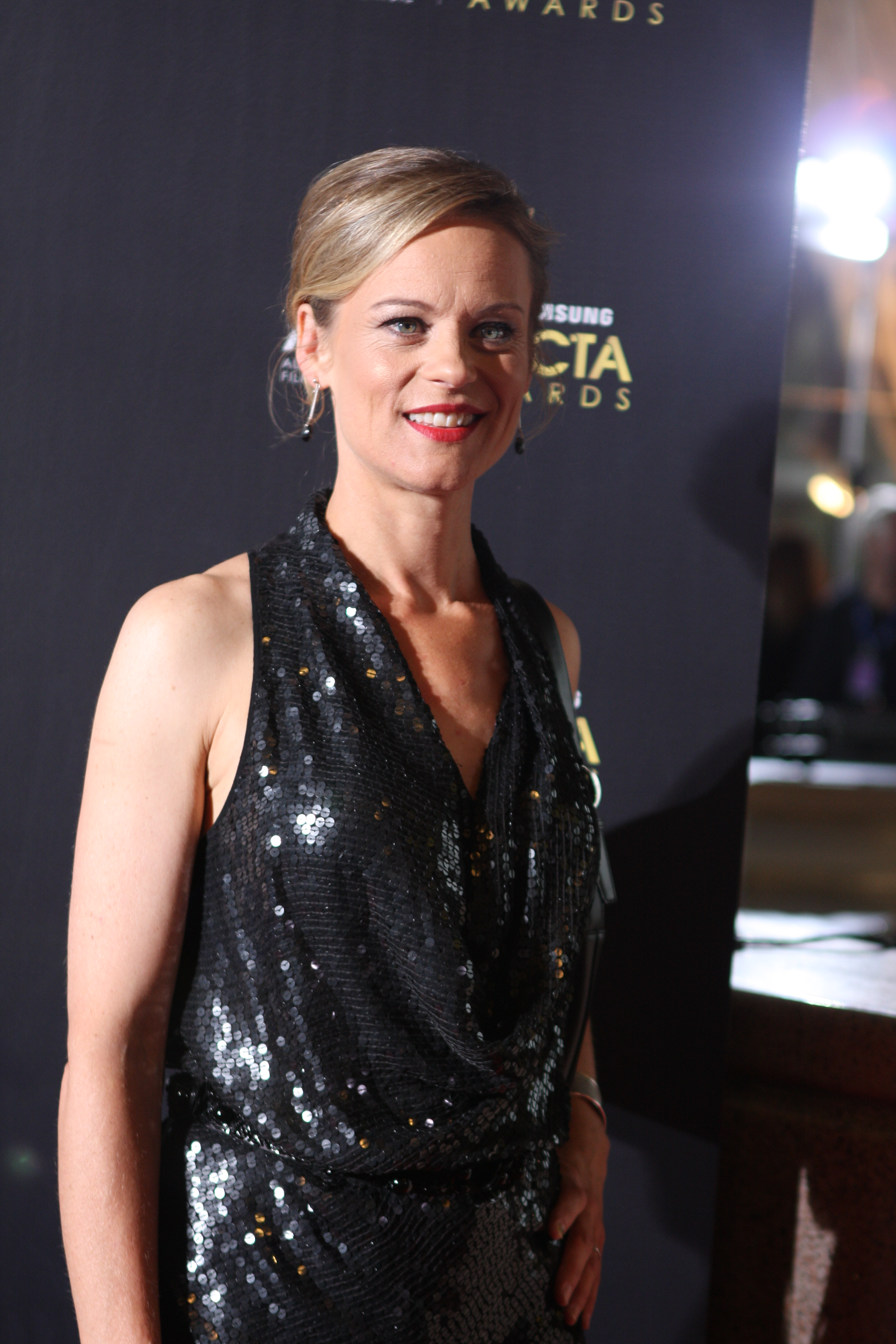
- Garner in 2012
- Born: Nadine Lynette Garner; 14 December 1970 (age 55); Knoxfield, Victoria, Australia
- Occupation: Actress
- Years active: 1985–present
- Spouse: Cameron Barnett (2005–2015)
- Partner: William Dim (2019–present)
- Children: 2

Nadine Lynette Garner (born 14 December 1970) is an Australian actress, known for her roles as Tamara in The Henderson Kids, Detective Senior Constable Jennifer Mapplethorpe in City Homicide, and Jean Beazley in The Doctor Blake Mysteries. She made her feature film debut in The Still Point (1986) and received an AFI nomination for Best Actress in a Lead Role for her role in Mull (1988). Garner has worked extensively in film, theatre and TV (both in Australia and the UK) and received awards and nominations for performances in each field.

== Career ==
Garner's first major role was in 1985 at age 15 as Tamara Henderson in The Henderson Kids, for which she won critical acclaim and several awards, including the Logie Award for Best Performance by a Juvenile. This was followed by a role in the soap opera Neighbours as Rachel Burns, and guest appearances in Prisoner and Prime Time. She played the lead role in the 1986 feature film The Still Point, and guested in episodes of The Flying Doctors and A Country Practice. She also appeared in two episodes of the four-part miniseries My Brother Tom as Jean Quayle. In August 1986, she reprised her role of Tamara Henderson and filmed the second season of The Henderson Kids, which was released the following year. Garner made her stage debut in the 1987 Melbourne Theatre Company production of A Day in the Death of Joe Egg.

Garner appeared in the 1987 Australian film Bushfire Moon, followed by Mull (1988) for which she won Best Actress at the 1988 Australian Film Institute Awards. She also starred in the television series House Rules. Garner played Arlene Toomer in the BBC comedy series Boys from the Bush for two series in 1991–1992. Further film roles include Metal Skin (1994), and Fresh Air (1999).

Garner has appeared in a series of minor and guest roles in multiple Australian and British television series, including The Bill, Shadows of the Heart miniseries, G.P., Twisted Tales, Good Guys Bad Guys, Raw FM, Tribe miniseries, Class Act, Water Rats, The Love of Lionel's Life telemovie, Changi miniseries – Ep.5, Heroes' Mountain telemovie, Young Lions, The Secret Life of Us, Stingers, My Life Is Murder and Through My Eyes miniseries.

Also interested in writing, she wrote and performed in the stage work Birds Eye View in Sydney in 2002. Garner has worked with most state theatre companies in a wide variety of roles in works by Shakespeare, Molière, Sheridan, Ibsen, Ziegler, Chekhov, Orton, Shaffer, Lawler and Elton. She also played the role of Desire in the highly controversial Australian musical Bad Boy Johnny and the Prophets of Doom.

In 2002–03, Garner played in a national tour of the musical Cabaret and received enthusiastic reviews—as well as two theatre awards—for her performance as "Fraulein Kost/Fritzi". From 2005 until 2006, she appeared in the Australian teen drama Blue Water High. She also appeared in feature films The Book of Revelation (2006), and Razzle Dazzle: A Journey into Dance (2007).

Garner played the regular role of Detective Senior Constable Jennifer Mapplethorpe in the police drama series City Homicide, from 2007 to 2011. In 2010, she returned to film, appearing in The Wedding Party.

Starting in February 2013, she starred as housekeeper Jean Beazley in The Doctor Blake Mysteries opposite Craig McLachlan. In September 2013, Garner appeared as Eve in episode four of the ABC1 television comedy series It's a Date.

On 13 January 2026, Garner was cast in the second season of High Country. On 25 October 2026, Garner was announced as part of the cast for Wentworth: Halfway Home in the role of Josie Simmons, the owner and boss of the halfway house.

== Personal life ==
Garner grew up in the Melbourne suburb of Knoxfield. She was married to Director of Photography Cameron Barnett, and they have one son and a daughter. Having divorced from Barnett, her partner (since 2019) is a designer and academic in Melbourne.

== Filmography ==
=== Television ===
Year	Title	Role	Notes
1985	The Henderson Kids	Tamara "Tam" Henderson	Main cast
1985	Neighbours	Rachel Burns	Recurring
1985	Prisoner	Young Girl	Episode 526 (S7-E21)
1986	My Brother Tom	Jean Quayle	TV miniseries
1986	A Country Practice	Bonnie Stewart	Episodes: "Growing Pains Parts 1 and 2"
1986	The Flying Doctors	Amanda	Episode: "E.T - New Girl in Town"
1987	The Henderson Kids II	Tamara "Tam" Henderson	Main cast
1988	House Rules	Sophie	TV series, 24 episodes
1989	The Flying Doctors	Judy McKenzie	Episode 22: "Blues for Judy"
1989	All The Way		TV series, 1 episode
1990	Shadows of the Heart	Recurring role: Lanty Fargo	TV miniseries, 2 episodes
1991	All Together Now	Karen Moyer	Episode: "I Want to be Bobby's Girl"
1991	A Country Practice	Donna Hume	Episodes: "For all the Good Times Parts 1 and 2"
1991	Boys from the Bush	Arlene Toomer	TV series, 20 episodes
1993	Cluedo	Anita Lockhart	TV series, 1 episode
1993	Phoenix	Lindy	Episode: "Inside Information"
1993	Secrets		TV series, 1 episode
1994	Under the Skin		TV film series, episode 1: "Dino, Where You Been"
1994–1995	Class Act	Gloria O'Grady	TV series, 14 episodes
1996	G.P.		TV series, 1 episode
1997	Twisted Tales	Mallory	Episode: "The Crossing"
1997	Raw FM	Zelda Lee	TV series, 13 episodes
1999	Tribe	Marie Sinclair	TV miniseries, 4 episodes
2000	Water Rats	Shelley Andrews	Episode: "Obsession"
2001	Changi	Lisa	TV miniseries, 1 episode
2002	Young Lions	Rebecca Ann Sharpe	Episodes: "Kickboxer Kills Racist"; "Kickboxer on Trial"
2004	Through My Eyes: The True Story of Lindy Chamberlain	Sally Lowe	TV miniseries, 2 episodes
2004	Stingers	Evelyn Ballantyne	Episode: "House of Mirrors"
2005	The Secret Life of Us	Anna	Episodes: "Dead Man Walking"; "Kicking the Habit"
2005–2006	Blue Water High	Deborah Callum / Deb	TV series, 27 episodes
2007–2011	City Homicide	Detective Senior Constable Jennifer Mapplethorpe	Main cast
2013	It's a Date	Eve	Episode: "Do Opposites Attract?"
2013–2017	The Doctor Blake Mysteries	Jean Beazley	Main cast
2014	Farmland Not Gaslands	Voice	Short film documentary
2017	Shakespeare Republic	Viola	Episode: "Viola"
2019	Mr. Black	Rowena Black	TV series, 2 episodes
2019	My Life Is Murder	Katrina Logan	Episode: "Remains to Be Seen"
2019	Part-Time Private Eyes	Karen	TV series, 2 episodes
2020	Bloom	Julie Cole	TV series, 4 episodes
2021	Lie With Me	Detective Taormina	TV miniseries, 4 episodes
2022	Savage River	Lynne Anderson	TV series, 6 episodes
2026	High Country: What Lies Beneath	Lynn McKenzie	TV series: 3 episodes
2026	Wentworth: Halfway Home	Josie Simmons	TV series

=== Film ===
Year	Title	Role	Notes
1986	The Still Point	Sarah	Feature film
1987	Bushfire Moon	Sarah O'Day	Feature film
1988	Half Circle		Short film
1988	Mull	Phoebe Mullens	Feature film Australian Film Institute Awards; ***1988: Won — Best Actress in a Lead Role
1993	The Feds	Tammy Warren	TV film series ("Deception")
1994	Metal Skin	Roslyn	Feature film
1997	Good Guys, Bad Guys: Only the Young Die Good	Jinx	TV film / TV pilot
1997	Treading Dirt	Rosy	Short film, 12 minutes
1999	Fresh Air	Kit	Feature film
2000	The Love of Lionel's Life	Lena	TV film
2002	Heroes' Mountain	Federal Policewoman	TV film
2005	In the Shadows		Short film, 10 minutes
2006	The Book of Revelation	Margot	Feature film
2007	Razzle Dazzle: A Journey into Dance	Sarah Gunner	Feature film
2010	The Wedding Party	Lisa	Feature film
2017	Speaking Daggers	Emilia	Short film
2017	Mrs McCutcheon	Jenny	Short film, 17 minutes
2017	The Doctor Blake Mysteries: "Family Portrait"	Jean Beazley	TV film (broadcast in UK as episodes 9 and 10 of series 5)
2018	The Blake Mysteries – A New Beginning: "Ghost Stories"	Jean Blake	TV film
2018	Celeste	Grace	Feature film
2022	Darklands	Samantha Romans	Feature film

=== Music video ===
Year	Title	Role	Notes
1998	You Am I: What I Don't Know 'Bout You	Partygoer	4 minutes

== Awards and nominations ==
Year	Association	Category	Work	Result
1985	Television Society of Australia	Penguin: Certificate of Special Recognition for Performance by an Actress in a Mini-series	The Henderson Kids	Won
1986	Logie Award	Best Performance by a Juvenile	The Henderson Kids	Won
1987	Television Society of Australia	Best Actress in a Lead Role	The Henderson Kids II	Won
1988	AFI	Best Actress in a Lead Role	The Mull	Won
1995	AFI Award	Best Actress in a Supporting Role	Metal Skins	Nominated
1995	FCCA (Film Critics Circle of Australia)	Best Actress in a Supporting Role	Metal Skins	Won
1997	AFI	Best Performance by an Actress in a Leading Role in a TV Drama	Raw FM	Nominated
2003	Australian Dance Awards	Outstanding Performance in a Stage Musical	Cabaret	Nominated
2003	Mo Awards	Best Supporting Actress in a Musical	Cabaret	Nominated
2003	Melbourne Green Room Award	Best Supporting Actress in a Musical	Cabaret	Won
2003	Helpmann Award	Best Female Actor in a Supporting Role in a Musical	Cabaret	Won
