= List of Australian films of 1981 =

== 1981 ==
| Title | Director | Cast | Genre | Notes |
|---|---|---|---|---|
| Against the Grain: More Meat Than Wheat | Tim Burns | Michael Callaghan, Sandy Edwards, Joy Burns, Mary Burns, Letham Burns, George Sutton, Mental as Anything, Robert Burns, Helen Grace, Greedy Smith, Lindsay Smith | Drama | IMDb |
| Airhawk: Star Of The North | David Baker | Eric Oldfield, Louise Howitt, Michael Aitkens, Elli Maclure, Jonathan Oldham, Philip Ross, Richard Moss, David Robson | Action / Drama TV film | aka Air Hawk |
| Alison's Birthday | Ian Coughlan | | feature film | |
| Angels of War | Gavan Daws, Hank Nelson | | Documentary | IMDb |
| Around the World with Dot | Yoram Gross | Drew Forsythe, Barbara Frawley, Ron Haddrick, Anne Haddy, Ross Higgins | Animation | IMDb |
| Ayers Rock | Paul Winkler | | Short | IMDb |
| The Best of Friends | Michael Robertson | Angela Punch McGregor, Graeme Blundell, Ruth Cracknell, Henri Szeps, Graham Rouse, Moya O'Sullivan, Les Foxcroft, Mark Lee, Sonja Tallis, Deborah Gray, Serge Lazareff, Alan Becher, Ron Falk, Maggie Dence, Gordon McDougall | Comedy / Romance | IMDb |
| Centrespread | Tony Paterson | Paul Trahair, Kylie Foster, Ivor Louis, Jack Neate, Edson Annan, Mark Watson | Drama / Romance Feature film | |
| A Dangerous Summer | Quentin Masters | Tom Skerritt, Ian Gilmour, James Mason, Wendy Hughes, Ray Barrett, Kim Deacon, Guy Doleman, Shane Porteous, Norman Kaye | Drama / Thriller Feature film | IMDb |
| Deadline | Arch Nicholson | Barry Newman, Trisha Noble, Bill Kerr, Alwyn Kurts, Bruce Spence, Vincent Ball, John Ewart, Willie Fennell, Eric Pearce, Sean Scully, Robert Hughes, Wallas Eaton, Norman Kaye, Noel Trevarthen | Drama / Thriller Feature film US Co-production | |
| Doctors & Nurses | Maurice Murphy | Rebecca Rigg, Miguel Lopez, Pamela Stephenson, Bert Newton, Richard Meikle, Andrew McFarlane, Drew Forsythe, Mary Anne Davidson, Jeremy Larson, Graeme Blundell, Terry Bader, June Salter, Joshua Samuels, Sarah Lambert | Family / Comedy Feature film | IMDb |
| Double Deal | Brian Kavanagh | Louis Jourdan, Angela Punch McGregor, Warwick Comber, Diane Craig, Bruce Spence, Peter Cummins, June Jago, Joan Letch, Kerry Walker | Crime / Drama / Thriller Feature film | IMDb |
| Gallipoli | Peter Weir | Mel Gibson, Mark Lee, Bill Kerr, Bill Hunter, Harold Hopkins, Robert Grubb, David Argue, Tim McKenzie, Ron Graham | Drama / War Feature film | IMDb |
| Grendel Grendel Grendel | Alexander Stitt | Peter Ustinov | Animation / Adventure | IMDb |
| Homicide Squad | Bob Meillon | John Gregg, Roger Ward, Frank Gallacher, Andrew Clarke, Ken Goodlet, Susanne Haworth, Louise Howitt, Michael Pate, Maureen Edwards, John Ley, Peter Cummins, Kerry Francis, Max Phipps, Rosie Bailey, Jeff Ashby, Jon Geros, Alan Hardy, Adrian Wright, Garry Meadows, Alwyn Kurts, Betty Lucas, Peter Kowitz | Drama / Thriller TV film / TV Pilot | aka The Squad |
| Hoodwink | Claude Whatham | John Hargreaves, Judy Davis, Dennis Miller, Max Cullen, Wendy Hughes, Les Foxcroft, Colin Friels, Paul Chubb, Ralph Cotterill, Wendy Strethlow, Willie Fennell, Ray Meagher, Michael Caton, Paul Sonkkila, Lex Marinos, Geoffrey Rush, Martin Vaughan | Crime / Comedy / Drama Feature film | IMDb |
| The Killing of Angel Street | Donald Crombie | Elizabeth Alexander, John Hargreaves, Reg Lye, Alexander Archdale, Arkie Whiteley, Ric Herbert, Caz Lederman, Gordon McDougall, David Downer, Brendon Lunney, Allen Bickford, Norman Kaye | Drama / Thriller Feature film | IMDb, Entered into the 32nd Berlin International Film Festival |
| Lady Stay Dead | Terry Bourke | Chard Hayward, Louise Howitt, Deborah Coulls, Les Foxcroft, Roger Ward, James Elliott | Drama / Horror / Thriller Feature film | IMDb |
| Mad Max 2: The Road Warrior | George Miller | Mel Gibson, Mike Preston, Bruce Spence, Vernon Wells, Bruce Spence, Emil Minty, Virginia Hey, Syd Heylen, Arkie Whiteley, Kjell Nilsson, William Zappa | Action / Drama Feature film | IMDb |
| The Myth Makers | Jonathan Dawson | | Documentary Short | IMDb |
| Nightmares | John Lamond | | feature film | |
| Pacific Banana | John D. Lamond | Graeme Blundell, Robin Stewart, Deborah Gray, Helen Hemingway, Luan Peters, Alan Hopgood, Alyson Best | Comedy Feature film | IMDb |
| Puberty Blues | Bruce Beresford | Nell Schofield, Jad Capelja, Geoff Rhoe, Charles 'Bud' Tingwell, Alan Cassell, Kirrily Nolan, Rowena Wallace, Tony Hughes, Sandy Paul, Leander Brett, Jay Hackett, Ned Lander, Joanne Olsen, Julie Medana, Michael Shearman, Dean Dunstone, Kate Sheil | Comedy / Drama Feature film | IMDb |
| Race for the Yankee Zephyr | David Hemmings | Ken Wahl, Lesley Ann Warren, Donald Pleasence, George Peppard, Bruno Lawrence, Harry Rutherford-Jones, Robert Bruce, Grant Tilly | Action / Adventure Feature film shot in New Zealand | IMDb, aka " Treasure of the Yankee Zephyr" |
| Road Games | Richard Franklin | Stacy Keach, Jamie Lee Curtis, Marion Edward, Bill Stacey, Thaddeus Smith, Stephen Millichamp, Alan Hopgood, Robert Thompson, Grant Page, Angie La Bozetta | Drama / Thriller Feature film | IMDb |
| Run, Rebecca, Run | Peter Maxwell | Simone Buchanan, Henri Szeps, John Stanton, John Ewart, Cornelia Frances, Mary Anne Severne, John Stanton, Adam Garnett, Ron Haddrick, Martin Vaughan, Peter Sumner | Family Drama Feature film | IMDb |
| Save the Lady | Leon Thau | Miranda Cartledge, Robert Clarkson, Matthew Excell, Kim Clifford, John Cobley, Desmond Tester, Barry Rugless, John Stone, Guy Marchand, Bill Kerr | Adventure Family Feature film | IMDb |
| Strange Behavior | Michael Laughlin | Michael Murphy, Louise Fletcher, Dan Shor, | Horror / Thriller Feature film shot in New Zealand | IMDb, AKA "Dead Kids" |
| Strange Residues | Alex Proyas | Colin Freganza, Kathy Fenton | Short | IMDb |
| The Survivor | David Hemmings | Robert Powell, Jenny Agutter, Peter Sumner, Joseph Cotten, Angela Punch-McGregor, Lorna Lesley, Paul Sonkkila, Adrian Wright, Ralph Cotterill | Drama / Mystery / Thriller Feature film | |
| Viva! San Fermin | Ivor Bowen | | Documentary | IMDb |
| Winter of Our Dreams | John Duigan | Judy Davis, Bryan Brown, Baz Luhrmann, Cathy Downes, Peter Mochrie, Mervyn Drake, Robert Hughes, Caz Lederman, Mercia Deane-Johns, Gia Carides | Drama Feature film | IMDb, Entered into the 13th Moscow International Film Festival |
| Wrong Side of the Road | Ned Lander | Ronnie Ansell, Peter Butler, Franco Carli, Sam Cohen, John Francis, Donald Freshwater, Leslie Graham, Ken Hampton Jr., Chris Haywood, Christian Jocumsen, Chris Jones | Documentary / Biography / Drama / Music Feature film | IMDb |

== See also ==
- 1981 in Australia
- 1981 in Australian television
