= Geneviève Picot =

Australian actress

- Born: 1956
- Occupation: Actress
- Years active: 1980–present
- Notable work: Proof; Undercover

Geneviève Picot is an Australian stage, film and television actress.

== Career ==
Picot is a graduate of the National Institute of Dramatic Art and some of her other performances include The Timeless Land, The Sullivans and Bread and Roses.

In 1983 Picot was nominated for an AACTA Award for Best Actress in a Leading Role for her performance in Undercover and in 1991 was nominated for the same award for her role in Proof.

== Filmography ==
=== Film ===
Year	Title	Role	Type
1983	Undercover	Libby	Feature film
1987	To Market To Market	Suzanna	Feature film
1991	Proof	Celia (as Genevieve Picot)	Feature film
1993	Bread & Roses	Sonja Davies	Feature film
1994	Muriel's Wedding	Store Detective	Feature film
1995	Maidenhead		Film short
1997	True Love and Chaos	Hannah	Feature film
2003	Max's Dreaming	Rose	Feature film
2006	Irresistible	Mara's Nurse	Feature film
2006	The Book of Revelation	Barmaid	Feature film
2010	The Last Bottle	Mary	Film short
2015	Force of Destiny	Louise	Feature film
2015	The Dressmaker	Mrs. Tobin	Feature film
2017	Ali's Wedding	Magistrate Cummings	Feature film

=== Television ===
Year	Film	Role	Type
1980	The Timeless Land	Recurring role: Emily	TV miniseries, 4 episodes
1980-81	The Sullivans	Regular role: Caroline Sullivan	TV series, 183 episodes
1983	Carson's Law	Guest role: Cecily Johnson	TV series, 2 episodes
1983	A Descant for Gossips	Lead role: Helen Striebel	TV miniseries, 3 episodes
1985	The Long Way Home	Lead role: Robin	TV film
1986	The Fast Lane	Guest role: Miriam	TV series, 1 episode
1987	The Petrov Affair	Recurring role: Joyce Bull	TV miniseries, 2 episodes
1988	The Four Minute Mile	Recurring role: Marjorie Jackson	TV miniseries, 2 episodes
1989	Inside Running	Lead role: Penelope Phillips	TV series, 19 episodes
1991	G.P.	Guest role: Melanie Sanders	TV series, 1 episode
1992	In Sydney Today	Guest	TV series, 1 episode
1992	Acropolis Now!	Guest role: Nurse Wallace	TV series, 1 episode
1992	Good Vibrations	Lead role: Kate Riener	TV miniseries, 2 episodes
1993	Seven Deadly Sins	Lead role: Eve	TV series, 1 episode 7: "Wrath"
1993	The Making of Nothing	Herself	TV special
1994-04	Good Morning Australia	Guest	TV series
1995	Halifax f.p. - Hard Corps	Guest role: Denise Rattigan	TV film series, 1 episode 5: "Hard Corps"
1995	Frontline	Guest role: Elizabeth Holst	TV series, 1 episode
1995	Law of the Land	Guest role: Val Weekes	TV series, 1 episode
1995	Fire	Recurring role: Sophie Harrison	TV series, 4 episodes
1996-98	Medivac	Lead Regular role: Julia McAlpine	TV series, 48 episodes
2002	MDA	Guest role: Dr. Sally Williams	TV series, 1 episode
2004	Wicked Science	Regular role: Principal Alexa Vyner	TV series, 15 episodes
2006	Abortion, Corruption and Corps: The Bertram Wainer Story	Lead role: Peggy Berman	TV film
2007	McLeod's Daughters	Guest role: Helen Hall	TV series, 2 episodes
2013	Miss Fisher's Murder Mysteries	Guest role: Valma Brightwell	TV series, 1 episode
2019	Rosehaven	Recurring role: Jenny	TV series, 3 episodes
2019	The Hunting	Guest role: Judge Goldsworth	TV miniseries, 1 episode
2021	Jack Irish	Recurring role: Det. Fran Underwood	TV series, 4 episodes
2025	Apple Cider Vinegar	Recurring role: Linda	TV series, 2 episodes

== Theatre ==
Year	Title	Role	Company / Location
1975	Verdi Requiem	Chorister	Sydney Opera House
1976	Blithe Spirit	Elvira Condomine	Playhouse Hobart
1977	Cabaret	Kit Kat Girl	Playhouse Hobart
1979	The Three Sisters		Jane Street Theatre
1979	The Beggar's Opera		NIDA Theatre, Playhouse Canberra
1979	The Ballad of the Sad Café		NIDA Theatre
1981	Antigone	Antigone / Eurydice	Melbourne Athenaeum with Melbourne Theatre Company
1981	Tales from the Vienna Woods	The Lady / Others	Nimrod Theatre
1982	As You Like It	Phoebe	Melbourne Athenaeum with Melbourne Theatre Company
1982	The Changeling	Diaphanta	Universal Theatre with Melbourne Theatre Company
1983	Who's Afraid of Virginia Woolf?	Honey	Russell Street Theatre, Theatre Royal, Sydney with Melbourne Theatre Company
1984	Top Girls	Lady Nijo / Win	Russell Street Theatre with Melbourne Theatre Company
1984	A Midsummer Night's Dream	Hermia	Melbourne Athenaeum, Sidney Myer Music Bowl with Melbourne Theatre Company
1985	Sons of Cain	Bronwyn	Playhouse Melbourne, Theatre Royal, Sydney with Melbourne Theatre Company
1985	The Benefactors	Sheila	Russell Street Theatre with Melbourne Theatre Company
1985	Trumpets and Raspberries	Lucia	Playhouse, Melbourne
1986	This is the Way the World Ends	Wagner	Church Theatre, Hawthorn with Australian Contemporary Theatre Co
1986	Wild Honey	Sofya	Playhouse Adelaide with STCSA
1987	Happy End	Lillian	Victorian College of the Arts
1987	The Comedy of Errors	Adriana	Church Theatre, Hawthorn
1988	Volpone	Lady Would Be / Androgene	Church Theatre, Hawthorn
1988	The Rivers of China	Audra / Doubles	Playhouse Melbourne with Melbourne Theatre Company
1988-89	A Respectable Wedding	The Bride	Melbourne Theatre Company
1990–91	Hotel Sorrento	Pippa	Monash University, Wharf Studio Theatre, Playbox Theatre
1990	Love Letters	Melissa Gardner	Victorian Arts Centre Trust
1990-91	On Top of the World	Stephanie	Fairfax Studio with Melbourne Theatre Company
1992	Summer of the Aliens	Norma	Russell Street Theatre with Melbourne Theatre Company
1993	The Temple	Brenda Blake / Mia (VO) / Lorna St John	Playbox Theatre, West Gippsland Arts Centre, Monash University
1994	The Sisters Rosensweig	Pfeni Rosensweig	Playhouse, Melbourne, Monash University, Theatre Royal, Hobart, Geelong Arts Centre, Wharf Theatre, Glen Street Theatre, Canberra Theatre Centre, His Majesty's Theatre, Perth with Melbourne Theatre Company
1994	A Flea in Her Ear	Lucienne Homenides De Histangua	Mietta's, Playhouse, Melbourne with Melbourne Theatre Company
1994	There's One In Every Marriage		Mietta's for Melbourne International Comedy Festival
1995	Arcadia	Lady Croom	Playhouse, Melbourne with Melbourne Theatre Company
1995	Summer of the Seventeenth Doll	Olive	Playhouse, Melbourne, Monash University, Bunbury Regional Entertainment Centre, Queens Park Theatre, Geraldton, Centennial Theatre, Kalgoorlie, His Majesty's Theatre, Perth, Glen Street Theatre; Canberra Theatre Centre, Ford Theatre, Geelong, The Capital, Bendigo, Gold Coast Arts Centre with Melbourne Theatre Company
1996	My Father's Father	Ruth / Anita	Fairfax Studio with Melbourne Theatre Company
1996	Miss Bosnia	Mira	Fairfax Studio, West Gippsland Arts Centre, Monash University, Canberra Theatre Centre, The Capital, Bendigo, Geelong Performing Arts Centre, Gold Coast Arts Centre with Melbourne Theatre Company
1998	Away	Coral	Victorian regional tour with Melbourne Theatre Company
2000	The Great Man	Fleur	Playhouse, QPAC, Playhouse, Melbourne with Sydney Theatre Company
2001	The Rain Dancers	Rita	Fairfax Studio with Melbourne Theatre Company
2001	The Vagina Monologues		Ensemble Theatre, University of Sydney
2002	The Aunt's Story	Various	Playhouse, Melbourne, Belvoir Street Theatre, Playhouse, QPAC with Melbourne Theatre Company
2005	Barmaids	Val	QUT, Theatre Royal, Hobart with Hit Productions
2007	Small Metal Objects	Carolyn	Forrest Place, Queen Street Mall, Mildura Centro, Bendigo Marketplace, Salamanca Square, Hannover, Germany, Place des Innocents, Paris, Radhuspladsen, Copenhagen, Noorderplantsoen, Groningen, Netherlands, Landiwiese, Zurich, Switzerland, Stratford Station, London
2005	Ray's Tempest	Ruthie	Fairfax Studio with Melbourne Theatre Company
2008	Rock'N'Roll	Eleanor / Older Esme	Playhouse, Melbourne with Melbourne Theatre Company, Sydney Theatre Company
2008	The Spook	Trixie / Phyllis	Malthouse Theatre, Ford Theatre, Geelong, The Capital, Bendigo, Frankston Arts Centre
2008	The Lower Depths	Anna	Fortyfivedownstairs
2009; 2011; 2015	Small Metal Objects	Carolyn	Back to Back Theatre & Korea tour
2010	The Grenade	Kerrie Haines	Playhouse, Melbourne, Sydney Opera House with Melbourne Theatre Company
2012	Queen Lear	Goneril	Southbank Theatre with Melbourne Theatre Company
2016	The Great Fire	Judith	Belvoir Theatre Company
2018	Aspirations of Daise Morrow	Older Woman	Canberra Theatre Centre, Wollongong Town Hall with Brink Productions
2022	Emilia	Judith / Priest / Lord Henry Carey	Playhouse, Melbourne, Canberra Theatre Centre
