= 1981 in Australian television =

This article is a summary of 1981 in Australian television.

== Events ==
=== Television ===
- 15 February – Channel Nine Celebrates 25 Years Of Television, hosted by Bert Newton
- 2 March – Network Ten introduces its new breakfast TV show, Good Morning Australia, marking the return of breakfast television to Australian television screens.
- 30 March – British sitcom To the Manor Born debuts on ABC.
- 10 April – The TV Week Logie Awards air on Network Ten for the first time.
- 23 May – Nine Network premieres a brand new sports program called Wide World of Sports.
- 27 July – Wheel of Fortune premieres on the Seven Network, hosted by Ernie Sigley with Adriana Xenides.
- 29 July – The Wedding of Charles, Prince of Wales, and Lady Diana Spencer is broadcast across ABC and almost every commercial channel in Australia.
- 16 September – The Nine Network celebrates 25 years of television in Australia.
- 12 November – Final episode of the Australia soap opera The Restless Years airs on Network Ten.
- 15 November – The Nine Network premieres its Sunday morning political current affairs program Sunday, hosted by Jim Waley.
- 23 November – A Country Practice debuts on Seven Network.
- December – After a two year-battle, Rupert Murdoch's News Limited finally gains control of the Melbourne headquarters of Network Ten after appealing the decision by the Australian Broadcasting Tribunal which blocked the takeover.

== Debuts ==
Program	Network	Debut date
And Here Comes Bucknuckle	ABC	26 January
Daily at Dawn	Seven Network	3 February
Good Morning Australia	Network Ten	2 March
Fatty and George	ABC	3 March
Outbreak of Love	ABC	15 March
Levkas Man	ABC	18 March
Wide World of Sports	Nine Network	23 May
Ratbags	Network Ten	2 June
I Can Jump Puddles	ABC	7 June
Holiday Island	Network Ten	17 June
Bellamy	Network Ten	26 June
Intimate Strangers	ABC	12 July
Wheel of Fortune	Seven Network	21 July
The New Price Is Right	Seven Network	7 September
The Nargun and the Stars	ABC	15 September
Sunday	Nine Network	15 November
A Country Practice	Seven Network	23 November
The National Today Show aka Today	Nine network	1981-

== New international programming ==
- 4 February – (United States) Knots Landing (Seven Network)
- 10 February – (United States) Buck Rogers in the 25th Century (Nine Network)
- 14 February – (United States) Freebie and the Bean (Network Ten)
- 21 February/26 June – (United States) Here's Boomer (21 February: Seven Network – Sydney, 26 June: Seven Network – Melbourne)
- 4 March – (United Kingdom) Worzel Gummidge (ABC)
- 4 March – (United States) Leatherstocking Tales (ABC)
- 8 March – (United Kingdom) To Serve Them All My Days (ABC)
- 14 March/7 May – (United Kingdom) The Sandbaggers (14 March: Nine Network – Sydney, 7 May: Nine Network – Melbourne)
- 30 March – (United Kingdom) To the Manor Born (ABC)
- 30 April – (United Kingdom) The Enigma Files (ABC)
- 4 May – (Japan) Monkey (ABC)
- 12 May – (United States) / (Australia) Drak Pack (Seven Network)
- 15 May – (Canada) Romie-0 and Julie-8 (Seven Network)
- 22 May – (Canada) The Devil and Daniel Mouse (Seven Network)
- 30 May – (United States) Magnum, P.I. (Network Ten)
- 5 June – (Canada) Matt and Jenny (ABC)
- 20 June – (United Kingdom) Yes Minister (ABC)
- 15 July – (United Kingdom) Jukes of Piccadilly (ABC)
- 8 August – (United States) Richie Rich (Nine Network)
- 24 August – (United States) Walt Disney's Mickey and Donald (Seven Network)
- 26 August – (United Kingdom) The Swish of the Curtain (ABC)
- 2 September – (United Kingdom) Arthur C. Clarke's Mysterious World (Nine Network)
- 7 September – (Canada) Wayne and Shuster (ABC)
- 7 October – (United Kingdom) God's Wonderful Railway (ABC)
- 22 October – (Australia) / (United Kingdom) Tenko (ABC)
- 27 October – (Canada) Huckleberry Finn and His Friends (Seven Network)
- 18 November – (United States) It's a Living (Nine Network)
- 18 November – (United States) Ladies' Man (Nine Network)
- 20 November – (United States) Goodtime Girls (Network Ten)
- 13 December – (United States) A Connecticut Rabbit in King Arthur's Court (Network Ten – Melbourne)
- 21 December – (United States) How Bugs Bunny Won the West (Network Ten)
- 23 December – (Canada) A Cosmic Christmas (ABC)
- 31 December – (United Kingdom) Hi-de-Hi! (ABC)

=== Changes to network affiliation ===
This is a list of programs which made their premiere on an Australian television network that had previously premiered on another Australian television network. The networks involved in the switch of allegiances are predominantly both free-to-air networks or both subscription television networks. Programs that have their free-to-air/subscription television premiere, after previously premiering on the opposite platform (free-to air to subscription/subscription to free-to air) are not included. In some cases, programs may still air on the original television network. This occurs predominantly with programs shared between subscription television networks.

==== International ====
Program	New network(s)	Previous network(s)	Date
(United States) The Nutty Squirrels Present	NRN	ABC	25 March

== Television shows ==
=== 1950s ===
- Mr. Squiggle and Friends (1959–1999)

=== 1960s ===
- Four Corners (1961–present)

=== 1970s ===
- Hey Hey It's Saturday (1971–1999, 2009–2010)
- Young Talent Time (1971–1988)
- Countdown (1974–1987)
- The Don Lane Show (1975–1983)
- 60 Minutes (1979–present)
- Prisoner (1979–1986)

=== 1980s ===
- Sale of the Century (1980–2001)
- Kingswood Country (1980–1984)
- Wheel of Fortune (1981–2008)
- A Town Like Alice, mini-series produced by Network Seven.

== Ending this year ==
Date	Show	Channel	Debut
22 April	Levkas Man	ABC	18 March 1981
28 April	Daily at Dawn	Seven Network	3 February 1981
5 May	Fatty and George	ABC	3 March 1981
19 July	Intimage Strangers	ABC	12 July 1981
27 July	Skyways	Seven Network	9 July 1979
2 August	I Can Jump Puddles	ABC	7 June 1981
13 October	The Nargun and the Stars	ABC	15 September 1981
12 November	The Restless Years	Network Ten	6 December 1977
18 December	Bellamy	Network Ten	26 June 1981

== See also ==
- 1981 in Australia
- List of Australian films of 1981
