= Levkas Man (miniseries) =

1981 Australian miniseries

- Based on: Levkas Man by Hammond Innes
- Written by: Peter Yeldham
- Directed by: Carl Schultz
- Starring: Robert Coleby; Marius Goring
- Countries of origin: Australia; United Kingdom; West Germany
- Original language: English
- No. of episodes: 6 x 1 hour

Production
- Producer: Damien Parer
- Production companies: Australian Broadcasting Corporation; Portman Productions; Studio Hamburg Filmproduktion

Original release
- Network: ABC (Australia)
- Release: 18 March – 22 April 1981

Levkas Man is a six-episode mini television series by the Australian Broadcasting Corporation (ABC) which aired from 18 March until 22 April 1981. It is based on the novel Levkas Man by Hammond Innes.

== Cast ==
- Robert Coleby as Paul Gerrard
- Marius Goring as Dr. Pieter Gerrard
- Ann Michelle as Nicola
- T. P. McKenna as Holroyd
- Kenneth Cope as Bert
- Takis Emmanuel as Kotiades
- Ferdy Mayne as Borg
- Ray Barrett

== Production ==
It was a joint Australian–British–West German production, and was shot on location in Greece.

== Reception ==
In a review published in The Sydney Morning Herald on 15 March 1981 titled "Pretty pictures—but pretty dull", reviewer Don Groves wrote, "Some producers believe an exotic location can elevate a fairly ordinary drama into an extraordinary drama. But picturesque bays, rugged cliffs and mountains can't disguise a routine plot, banal dialogue, or mediocre acting."

A review published in The Sydney Morning Herald on 23 March 1981 titled "Aunty loses on a winner" reads, "If you enjoy adventure-mystery-action, then let me recommend Levkas Man (2) Wednesdays at 8.30 pm. And if you enjoy seeing film that's made with vivid visuals and expert cutting, then once again let me recommend Levkas Man. it moves as a well-made show should, and thereby hands an Australian tale." The Australian reviewer goes on to lament, "While you watch, consider this: the only benefit the ABC gets from our input is the right to play the show twice in Australia. No matter how successful Levkas Man may be in world sales for years to come, our people cannot share the profits. Not good enough. But this is no attack on the ABC. I suspect Aunty could not buy a share of the action because she is short of capital."
