= Catch Us If You Can (game show) =

Australian television series

Catch Us If You Can is an Australian game and prank television series which ran for 30 episodes on the Seven Network in 1981. It consisted of games for members of the studio audience and pre-recorded pranks, similar to Candid Camera. The pranks were usually on unsuspecting members of the public but occasionally on celebrities.

Its pilot aired on Channel 9 in 1980 but they did not take up the show and it moved to Channel 7, beginning in February. It was axed in April 1981.

It was conceived by Lyle McCabe and was hosted in the studio by Bryan Davies. Cast members included, Deborah Gray, Edith Bliss, Ian McRae, Marty Morton, Mark Kounnas, Shirley Strachan Lynette Laming, Amanda Dryburgh and Grant Dodwell. The host for the pilot was Geoff Stone and other cast members included Geoff Harvey, Jacki MacDonald, Robin Stewart, Pete Smith and Abigail.
