= Ann Michelle =

British actress (born 1952)

- Born: Ann Nathan; 11 August 1952 (age 73); Chigwell, Essex, England
- Occupation: Actress
- Spouse: Richard May
- Relatives: Vicki Michelle (sister)

Ann Michelle (born 11 August 1952) is a British actress.

== Biography ==
Michelle was born on 11 August 1952 in Chigwell, Essex, and was educated at Knewnham Primary School and West Hatch Technical High School. Her father Joseph was a fish trader at Billingsgate Fish Market and her mother Shirley an actress. One of her sisters is the actress Vicki Michelle. While her parents were at work, they employed Elke Sommer as an au-pair girl to look after Michelle and her three sisters.

Michelle trained at the Aida Foster stage school and her acting career has mostly been in film and television. Her earliest appearances included roles in Love in Our Time (1968) and an uncredited appearance in The Prime of Miss Jean Brodie (1969). Michelle's most notable acting role was as Jane Pettibone in the cult British horror film Psychomania (1973), and her other film appearances included roles in House of Whipcord (1974), Mistress Pamela (1974), Cruel Passion (1977), Young Lady Chatterley (1977), Haunted (1977), and French Quarter (1978).

Michelle also starred in Virgin Witch (1972) opposite her sister Vicki. She later disowned Virgin Witch, according to an article in the Sarasota Herald of 12 November 1973, saying that the producer had just wanted nude scenes.

In 1981 Michelle had a prominent role in the TV miniseries Levkas Man based on the novel of the same name.

Michelle is a director of the Trading Faces celebrity agency.

She was married to the Reading Racers speedway rider Richard May.
