= Against the Grain =

Against the Grain may refer to:

== Film, television and radio ==
- Against the Grain: More Meat Than Wheat, a 1981 Australian film
- Against the Grain (TV series), a 1993 American drama series
- Against the Grain, a radio program produced by the Pacifica Foundation

== Literature ==
- Against the Grain (novel) or À rebours, an 1884 novel by Joris-Karl Huysmans
- Against the Grain: A Deep History of the Earliest States, a 2017 book by James C. Scott
- Against the Grain: An Autobiography, a 1990 book by Boris Yeltsin
- Against the Grain: How Agriculture Has Hijacked Civilization, a 2004 book by Richard Manning
- Against the Grain: Mad Artist Wallace Wood, a 2003 book edited by Bhob Stewart
- Against the Grain, a periodical for librarians published by the Charleston Conference

== Music ==
- Against the Grain Theatre, an opera company in Toronto, Ontario, Canada

=== Albums ===
- Against the Grain (Acoustic Alchemy album) or the title song, 1994
- Against the Grain (Bad Religion album) or the title song, 1990
- Against the Grain (Kurupt album), 2005
- Against the Grain (Phoebe Snow album), 1978
- Against the Grain (Redgum album), 2004
- Against the Grain (Rory Gallagher album), 1975
- Against the Grain (The Veer Union album), 2009
- Against da Grain, by YoungBloodZ, 1999
- Against the Grain, by Snakefinger, 1983

=== Songs ===
- "Against the Grain", by Akon from Freedom, 2008
- "Against the Grain", by Garth Brooks from Ropin' the Wind, 1991

== Other uses ==
- Against the grain, a direction of woodworking in relation to a piece's wood grain
- Against the Grain Brewery, a brewery in Kentucky
