= 1981 in Australia =

- Monarch: Elizabeth II
- Governor-General: Sir Zelman Cowen
- Prime minister: Malcolm Fraser
- Population: 14,923,260
- Australian of the Year: John Crawford
- Elections: NSW

The following lists events that happened during 1981 in Australia.

- Decades: 1960s; 1970s; 1980s; 1990s; 2000s
- See also: 1981 in Australian television; 1981 in Australian literature; Other events of 1981; Timeline of Australian history

== Incumbents ==
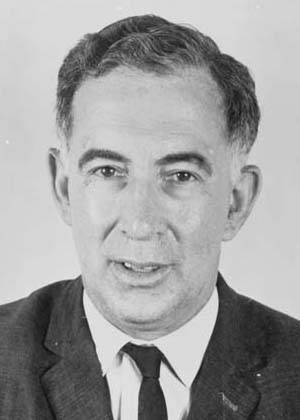
Sir Zelman Cowen

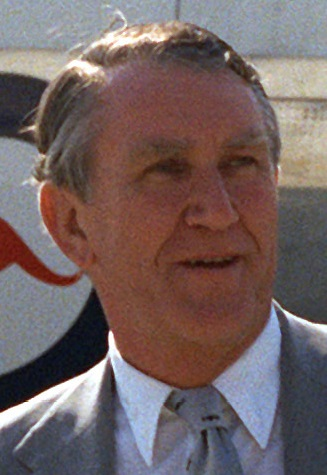
Malcolm Fraser

- Monarch – Elizabeth II
- Governor-General – Sir Zelman Cowen
- Prime Minister – Malcolm Fraser
  - Deputy Prime Minister – Doug Anthony
  - Opposition Leader – Bill Hayden
- Chief Justice – Sir Garfield Barwick (until 11 February), then Sir Harry Gibbs

=== State and territory leaders ===
- Premier of New South Wales – Neville Wran
  - Opposition Leader – John Mason (until 29 May), then Bruce McDonald (until 12 October), then John Dowd
- Premier of Queensland – Joh Bjelke-Petersen
  - Opposition Leader – Ed Casey
- Premier of South Australia – David Tonkin
  - Opposition Leader – John Bannon
- Premier of Tasmania – Doug Lowe (until 11 November), then Harry Holgate
  - Opposition Leader – Geoff Pearsall (until 11 November), then Robin Gray
- Premier of Victoria – Rupert Hamer (until 5 June), then Lindsay Thompson
  - Opposition Leader – Frank Wilkes (until 9 September), then John Cain Jr.
- Premier of Western Australia – Sir Charles Court
  - Opposition Leader – Ron Davies (until 18 September), then Brian Burke
- Chief Minister of the Northern Territory – Paul Everingham
  - Opposition Leader – Jon Isaacs (until 1 November), then Bob Collins
- Chief Minister of Norfolk Island – David Buffett

=== Governors and administrators ===
- Governor of New South Wales – Sir Roden Cutler (until 19 January), then Sir James Rowland
- Governor of Queensland – Sir James Ramsay
- Governor of South Australia – Sir Keith Seaman
- Governor of Tasmania – Sir Stanley Burbury
- Governor of Victoria – Sir Henry Winneke
- Governor of Western Australia – Sir Richard Trowbridge
- Administrator of Norfolk Island – Peter Coleman (until 19 March), then Ian Hutchinson (until 10 May), then Thomas Paterson
- Administrator of the Northern Territory – John England (until 1 January), then Eric Johnston

== Events ==
=== January ===
- 30 January – Sir Harry Gibbs is announced as the next Chief Justice of the High Court of Australia in the wake of Sir Garfield Barwick's resignation.

=== February ===
- 8 February – A murdered woman's decapitated body (Kim Barry) is found near Kiama on a ledge under the Jamberoo Lockout.
- 10 February – Townsville International Airport opens in Townsville
- 14 February – Australia withdraws recognition of the Pol Pot regime in Cambodia.
- 17 February – A funnel-web antivenene, developed over 22 years, is used for the first time in Sydney.
- 20 February – Alice Springs coroner Denis Barritt finds that Azaria Chamberlain was killed by a dingo.

=== March ===
- 11 March – Prime Minister Malcolm Fraser informs Parliament that US B-52 bombers will be allowed to land at Darwin from their base at Guam.
- 19 March – The South Australian Parliament passes the Anangu Pitjantjatjara Yankunytjatjara Land Rights Act 1981.

=== April ===
- 15 April – Minister for Industrial Relations Andrew Peacock resigns from cabinet accusing the prime minister of gross disloyalty.
- 16 April – The New South Wales Government's controversial election funding Bill is introduced into Parliament, provoking strong Opposition criticism. The Bill imposes stringent declaration conditions with political donations of more than $200, requiring a statement giving the name and address of donors.
- 26 April – First tethered flight of Defence Science and Technology Group's Hoveroc rocket is carried out at Port Wakefield, South Australia. It was the world's first practical hovering rocket.
- 29 April – A fire at the Pacific Nursing Home kills 16 in Sylvania, a suburb of Sydney.
- 30 April –
  - The Federal Government's Committee of Review into Government Functions, nicknamed "The Razor Gang", releases its final report and begins a series of cuts in spending on public services and instrumentalities.
  - Graham Potter, aged 23, is charged with the murder of a woman found decapitated near Kiama on 8 February. He is refused bail after denying the allegations.

=== May ===
- 7 May –
  - Alleged crime boss, Robert Trimbole, leaves Australia.
  - Three engineering companies make agreements for shorter working weeks with metal trade union representatives in Sydney, giving a major boost to the ongoing campaign for a 35-hour week.
- 9 May – Assisted passage to Australia is now restricted to refugees.
- 26 May – Foreign Affairs Minister Tony Street announces that the United States has asked Australia to send peacekeepers to the Sinai Desert.

=== June ===
- 5 June – Rupert Hamer resigns as Premier of Victoria after losing the support of his party. Lindsay Thompson is selected by the party-room to become Victorian Liberal leader and Premier of Victoria.
- 18 June – The 4 millionth Holden car leaves the GMH assembly line.
- 23 June – The Queensland Government approves sand mining on Moreton Island.

=== July ===
- 17 July – A truck drivers' strike in most states causes the Queensland Government to declare a state of emergency.
- 24 July – The Queensland Government declares a state of emergency over a threat to food supplies caused by the transport workers' strike.
- 30 July – The ALP National Conference rewords its socialist objective and endorses affirmative action.
- 31 July – The Commonwealth Conciliation and Arbitration Commission decides to end wage indexation, a system which has been established in April 1975. President Sir John Moore stated that the guidelines indexing wage adjustments to inflation would no longer be applied to cases before the commission. Each case will now be decided on individual merit.

=== August ===
- 24 August – The Church of England in Australia is renamed the Anglican Church of Australia.

=== September ===
- 1 September – Further changes are made to the Medibank health scheme and free treatment of uninsured people in standard hospital wards is abolished.
- 6 September – 22=year-old Deborah Anne Smykalla is murdered in her home in the Brisbane suburb of Capalaba. As of 2025, her murder remains unsolved.
- 19 September –
  - The ALP government of Neville Wran is re-elected in New South Wales, increasing his majority from his "Wranslide" win in 1978.
  - Northern Territory Chief Minister Paul Everingham orders the police to re-open the investigation into Azaria Chamberlain's disappearance.
- 21 September – Seven people are killed when a Cessna 206 aeroplane crashes at Charleville.

=== October ===
- 1 October – The National Bank of Australasia and the Commercial Banking Company of Sydney amalgamate to create the National Australia Bank.

=== November ===
- 2 November – The Bank of New South Wales and the Commercial Bank of Australia Limited merge to form a new bank which commences trading under the name of Westpac twelve months later.
- 11 November – Harry Holgate becomes Premier of Tasmania after the resignation of Doug Lowe.
- 12 November – The Federal Government declares the Cairns section of the Great Barrier Reef a marine park, overriding the Queensland Government.
- 20 November – Alice Springs coroner Denis Barritt's findings in relation to Azaria Chamberlain are quashed by Mr. Justice Toohey of the Supreme Court of the Northern Territory. A new inquest is ordered and begins on 30 November.

=== December ===
- 12 December – A referendum is held in Tasmania to vote for whether or not the Franklin Dam should be built. 47% vote for the original proposal, 8% vote for the compromise solution & 45% vote informally. It is estimated that up to one-third of all votes were for 'no dams', which was not a sanctioned option.
- 31 December – New South Wales abolishes death duties.

=== Unknown dates ===
- Public funding of election campaigns introduced in New South Wales
- Victoria decriminalizes homosexual acts between consenting adults

== Arts and literature ==
- Peter Carey's novel Bliss wins the Miles Franklin Award

== Film ==
- Puberty Blues
- Gallipoli

== Television ==
- 2 March – Good Morning Australia premieres on Network Ten, marking the return of breakfast television to Australian television screens.
- 10 April – The TV Week Logie Awards air on Ten for the first time. It is also the first time that the Logies have not been screened on the Nine Network.
- 27 July – Wheel of Fortune premieres on the Seven Network
- 16 September – The Nine Network celebrates 25 years of television in Australia
- November – A Country Practice debuts on Channel 7

== Sport ==
- 1 February – Trevor Chappell bowls underarm in the final delivery of the game against New Zealand at the Melbourne Cricket Ground (MCG). The delivery leads to the banning of underarm deliveries in cricket.
- 28 March – Australia is represented by fifteen long-distance runners (nine men, six women) at the ninth IAAF World Cross Country Championships in Madrid, Spain. Robert de Castella is Australia's best finisher, claiming the sixth spot (35:20.0) in the race over 12 kilometres.
- 30 March – The Canberra Raiders are accepted as the fourteenth team in the New South Wales Rugby League (NSWRL) for 1982 & making them the first team based outside of New South Wales.
- The sin bin rule is introduced in rugby league. Newtown hooker Barry Jensen becomes the first player sent there.
- 6 June – Kevin Bartlett becomes the first player to play 350 Victorian Football League (VFL) games, celebrating as Richmond Football Club beat Melbourne 20.16 (136) to 14.10 (94).
- 25 July – Garry Bentley wins the men's national marathon title, clocking 2:16:58 in Werribee, while Rosemary Longstaff claims the inaugural women's title in 2:46:48.
- 29 July – The VFL board announces that South Melbourne will play 11 games in Sydney in 1982.
- 29 August – South Melbourne play their last game at the Lake Oval in Albert Park against North Melbourne. North Melbourne win, 15.17 (107) to 10.14 (74).
- 26 September – Carlton 12.20 (92) defeat Collingwood (10.12 (72)) to win the 85th premiership. It is the last time Collingwood would feature in a grand final until 1990.
- 27 September – The Parramatta Eels defeat the Newtown Jets 20-11† to win the 74th NSWRL premiership. It is also the first premiership for the Parramatta Eels, who had been trying to win one since 1947. Fans celebrate by burning down the main grandstand of the Cumberland Oval, which was due to be demolished. The Balmain Tigers finish in last position, claiming the wooden spoon.
- 3 October – Port Adelaide (14.11 (95)) defeat Glenelg (6.8 (44)) at Football Park to win their 27th South Australian National Football League (SANFL) premiership. Port Adelaide's Russell Ebert is awarded the inaugural Jack Oatey medal for best player during the grand final.
- 3 November – Just A Dash wins the Melbourne Cup.

†=Scored under outdated scoring system.

== Births ==
- 3 January – Don Brown, politician
- 8 January – Trent Waterhouse, rugby league player
- 20 January – Brendan Fevola, footballer
- 27 January – Greg Owens, soccer player
- 17 February – Lisa Skinner, gymnast
- 24 February – Lleyton Hewitt, tennis player
- 26 February – Daniel Geale, welterweight boxer
- 2 April – Michael Clarke, cricketer

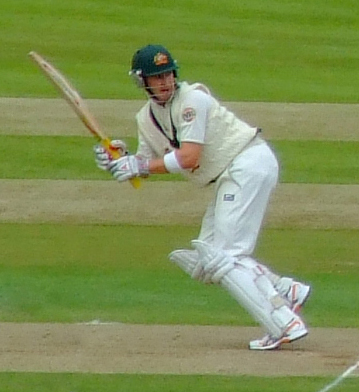
Michael Clarke

- 11 April – Veronica Pyke, cricketer
- 16 April – Vico Thai, actor
- 11 May – Lauren Jackson, basketball player
- 20 May – Mark Winterbottom, motor racing driver
- 26 May – Robert Copeland, footballer
- 7 June – Luke Burt, rugby player
- 12 June – Paul Hasleby, footballer
- 13 June - Mick Fanning, Surfer
- 15 June – Andrew McDonald, cricketer
- 17 June – Shane Watson, cricketer
- 24 July – Doug Bollinger, cricketer
- 26 July – Abe Forsythe, actor
- 8 August – Vanessa Amorosi, singer-songwriter, entertainer
- 17 September – Matt Kean, politician
- 11 October – Beau Brady, actor
- 18 October – Nathan Hauritz, cricketer
- 19 October – Sarah Taylor, field hockey player
- 22 October – Bradley Hore, boxer
- 26 October – Guy Sebastian, singer-songwriter, Australia's first Idol
- 2 November – Mitchell Johnson, cricketer
- 16 November – Kate Miller-Heidke, singer
- 21 December – Justin Kane, bantamweight boxer
- 26 December – Nikolai Nikolaeff, actor
- 27 December – Emilie de Ravin, actress
- 31 December – Matthew Pavlich, Australian rules footballer

== Deaths ==
- 7 January – Eric Robinson (born 1929), Liberal politician
- 7 March – Sir Lorimer Dods (born 1900), medical pioneer (born 1900)
- 16 June – Sir Thomas Playford (born 1896), Premier of South Australia
- 29 June – Russell Drysdale (born 1912), painter
- 19 October – Dymphna Cusack (born 1902), writer
- 2 September – Dame Enid Lyons (born 1897), Liberal politician
- 9 September – Sir Robert Askin (born 1907), Premier of New South Wales
- 23 December – Sir Reginald Ansett (born 1909), businessman

== See also ==
- 1981 in Australian literature
- 1981 in Australian television
- List of Australian films of 1981
