= A Place in the World (miniseries) =

- Written by: Michael Cove
- Directed by: Michael Carson; Chris Thomson; Eric Taylor; Carl Schultz
- Starring: John Gregg; Nick Tate; Ian Gilmour; John Gaden
- Country of origin: Australia
- Original language: English
- No. of episodes: 6

Production
- Running time: 60 minutes

Original release
- Network: ABC
- Release: 26 August – 29 September 1979

A Place in the World is a 1979 Australian miniseries of ABC plays about a school reunion.

== Premise ==
Five middle-aged men experiencing dilemmas and concerned about their respective futures, come together for a school reunion. Each episode focuses on one of the central characters.

== Cast ==
- John Gregg as Peter Paget
- Nick Tate as Kenneth Reissel
- John Gaden as Warwick Lacey
- Paul Mason as Les Crimmond
- Kerry Francis as Alan Maguire
- David Nettheim as Laurie Carter
- Jane Harders as Polly Paget
- Ian Gilmour
- Arkie Whiteley
- Carmen Duncan
- Ken Blackburn
- Anne Haddy
- Vincent Ball
- Moya O'Sullivan
- Max Osbiston

== Episodes ==
Ep.	Title	Air Date
1	"Man of Ideas"	26 August 1979
2	"A Man of Dreams"	2 September 1979
3	"A Man of Action"	9 September 1979
4	"A Family Man"	16 September 1979
5	"Man of Mateship"	23 September 1979
6	"The Men"	30 September 1979
