= Fresh Start (TV series) =

Fresh Start is an Australian television series created for 1990's International Literacy Year.

The series consists of two sections. One section is a series of six 10 minute documentaries while the other is 12 half hour dramas. The documentaries feature a wide range of subjects talking about the effects of low literacy and programs in place to improve literacy. The dramas follow an adult literacy teacher Kerry (Caz Lederman) who in each episode (named for the guest character) works with a new student who for different reasons are trying to improve their literacy. These characters include Billy (Dean Love), a mechanic who needs to learn to advance his career prospects, Linda (Anne Tenney), a country mother who can't read medicine labels, Mick (Denis Grosvenor), a prisoner who's cellmate has been writing for him and Marcia (Judith Stratford), a housewife who wants to read in church.

== Episodes ==
- Billy

written by Marion Ord. produced and directed by Jacqui Sykes
cast: Dean Love, Caz Lederman

- Marcia

written by Marion Ord. produced and directed by Jacqui Sykes
cast: Judith Stafford, Caz Lederman, Alex Morcos, Barry Langrish

- Tracey

written by Sylvia Johnson. produced and directed by Roger Bayley
cast: Sascha Huckstep, Caz Lederman, Sonja Tallis, Sharon Tamlyn.

- Frank

written by Sylvia Johnson. produced and directed by Roger Bayley.

- Linda

written by Marion Ord. produced and directed by Paul Schneller
cast: Anne Tenney, Caz Lederman, Ritchie Singer

- Kevin

written by Marion Ord. produced and directed by Paul Schneller
cast: Robert Noble, Caz Lederman, Mary-Lou Stewart, John Paramor

- Mick

written by Peter Neale. directed by Tony Wickert
cast: Dennis Grosvenor, Caz Lederman, Ben Gabriel, Geoff Cartwright.

- Chris

written by Peter Neale. directed by Tony Wickert
cast: Alex Morcos, Caz Lederman, Penny Pederson

- Luisa

written by Sylvia Johnson. produced and directed by Roger Bayley
cast: Carmel Cullen, Caz Lederman, David Weatherley

- Elsie

written by Sylvia Johnson. produced and directed by Roger Bayley
cast: Lillian Crombie, John Blair, Caz Lederman, Sarah Lambert.

- Steve

written by Peter Neale. produced and directed by Paul Schneller
cast: Gavin Harrison, Caz Lederman, Jane Ahlquist, John Allen

- Dennis

written by Peter Neale. produced and directed by Paul Schneller
cast: Terry Serio, Caz Lederman, Karen Day
