= Masters of Venus =

1962 British children's film serial by Ernest Morris

- Opening titles
- Directed by: Ernest Morris
- Screenplay by: Michael Barnes
- Produced by: A. Frank Bundy
- Starring: Norman Wooland; Amanda Coxell; Robin Stewart
- Cinematography: Reg Wyer
- Edited by: John S. Smith
- Music by: Eric Rogers
- Release date: 1962
- Running time: 16 minutes (per episode)
- Country: United Kingdom
- Language: English

Masters of Venus is a 1962 British science fiction black-and-white film serial directed by Ernest Morris and starring Norman Wooland, Mandy Harper, and Robin Stewart. It was produced by A. Frank Bundy for the Children's Film Foundation and distributed as a weekly serial in eight 16-minute parts, each of which ends on a cliffhanger, for Saturday morning cinema clubs. The complete serial has a running time of 133 minutes.

Two children are accidentally launched into space in a rocket built by their father, and land on the planet Venus.

== Plot ==
The rocket Astarte is prematurely fired into space by Venusian saboteurs. On board are two children. When the rocket ends up on Venus, they experience a sequence of Flash Gordon style adventures, in a civilisation which consists of the super-advanced survivors of Atlantis. Ultimately, by their intervention, war between Earth and Venus is averted.

== Production ==
One of the regular characters, the Venusian girl Marla, was played by the 16-year-old Zienia Merton, who later in her career would appear in Doctor Who ("Marco Polo", 1964) and in Space:1999 (1975–1977).

There were two types of Venusians, a group of five-fingered ones and a group of six-fingered ones. Actors playing the latter had to wear gloves to simulate 6 fingers, and as a pair could not be found small enough for Zienia, she recalls the director telling her to "keep my hands clasped and not to point at anything."

== Chapters ==
1. Sabotage
2. Lost in Space
3. The Men With Six Fingers
4. The Thing in the Crater
5. Prisoners of Venus
6. The Killer Virus
7. Kill on Sight
8. Attack

== Cast ==
- Norman Wooland as Doctor Ballantyne
- Mandy Harper as Pat
- Robin Stewart as Jim
- Robin Hunter as Peter
- Patrick Kavanagh as Mike
- Arnold Diamond as Imos
- George Pastell as Kallas
- Ferdy Mayne as Votan
- Jackie Martin as Borlas
- Zienia Merton as Marla
- Tony Calvin as Joe
- Robert Bruce as George
- Andrew Laurence as Colonel Armstrong
- Robert James as Stewart

== Reception ==
The Monthly Film Bulletin wrote: "Every time the luminous tail of that splendid rocket shoots into the clouds it's a signal for another space-age adventure tailored to the nerves of the space-age kid. Suspense, apprehension, shock, are tempered at the exact dramatic moment by the assurance that all will be well, and a sense of the mystery of both science and beauty is created by the authentic appearance of complicated machinery and an atmosphere of awe around the rocket itself – propped with a majestic fantasy among planetary rocks, almost like Méliés brought up to date. Spectacle on Venus is concentrated in the opulent black and white costumes, and excitement is consistently maintained by skilful editing (the intercut heads, for example, of villains and children as they appear in close-up against the rungs of a ladder), a music score which combines all the ingredients of portentous drama and cheerful other-worldliness (especially with the jazz combo in the orbit sequences), and an imaginative image like the leaves over a news-banner announcing 'Space Kids to Venus'. The element of social morality is handled with a nice balance between realism and faith in humanity: the dissension on Venus reflects our own, but those of the aggressive military faction who believe that 'Attack is the best means of defence' are finally replaced by the progressive leader with his humanitarian ideals."
