= Undercover (1983 film) =

- Directed by: David Stevens
- Written by: Miranda Downes
- Produced by: David Elfick
- Starring: Michael Pare; Geneviève Picot; Peter Phelps; Barry Otto; Sandy Gore; Nicholas Eadie
- Music by: Bruce Smeaton; William Motzing
- Production company: Filmco
- Distributed by: Roadshow
- Release date: 1983
- Country: Australia
- Language: English
- Budget: A$3.5 million (est)
- Box office: AU $44,666 (Australia)

Undercover is a 1983 Australian film directed by David Stevens. Michael Pare, Geneviève Picot, Peter Phelps, Barry Otto, Nicholas Eadie and Sandy Gore star in the film.

== Cast ==
- Michael Pare as Max
- Geneviève Picot as Libby
- Peter Phelps as Theo
- Barry Otto as Professor Henckel
- Sandy Gore as Nina
- Nicholas Eadie as Frank Bugden
- John Walton as Fred
- Julie Nihill as Design Room Girl
- Caz Lederman as May
- Ian Gilmour as Simon

== Production ==
It was based on an original idea by Miranda Downes, who wanted to make a film based on Australian underwear manufacturer Fred Burley. Stevens was attracted to the film because it gave him the chance to make a film that was fun and glamorous, which said something about Australia.

The investors insisted on an American actor in the cast. Dennis Quaid was originally meant to play the American lead but his involvement was objected to by Actors Equity. Equity also did not like Stevens' second choice for the role but approved his third, Pare.
