= Deborah Gray =

Australian actress, model and author (born 1958)

- Born: 1958 (age 67–68); Canberra, Australian Capital Territory
- Occupations: Writer; singer; songwriter; cabaret/nightclub performer; TV host; composer; producer; former fashion model; former actress
- Musical career
- Genre: Jazz
- Labels: CBS Records/Sony, Laser Records, Coconut Records
- Formerly of: Trouble, ARVO

Deborah Gray (born 1958) is an Australian international best selling fictional author, primarily known for publishing magic and spell books and is also a singer-songwriter, who was a former high fashion magazine and catwalk model, actress and documentary director and producer.

== Early life ==
Gray was born in Canberra, Australian Capital Territory in 1958. as a teenager while still at school, she was scouted by a leading Sydney agent for a modelling contract and after moving to Sydney, she became a successful model for fashion magazines. She appeared on the covers of the now defunct Cleo and Dolly magazine and also featured in national TV commercials including for National Quintrix, Sunwhite Rice, Holden and Coca Cola.

Gray appeared on catwalks, top fashion magazine covers and pictorials among them New Idea, Bride to Be and TV Week.

== Acting ==
Gray branched out into acting when she featured on later episodes of the TV series Number 96 in 1977 as Miss Hemingway. She continued her acting career as a popular television and film actress.

She played in several guest role's in soap opera The Young Doctors, acted in the police drama series Bellamy (1981), and was a regular co-host in an Australian Candid Camera style television series titled Catch Us If You Can.

Gray started an all-girl cabaret act named Deborah Gray and the Flames (one of the flames was future Perfect Match hostess Debbie Newsome). Gray went on to appear on the cover of Australian Playboy and was showcased in its best-selling actor profile and pictorial, and acted in two 1981 feature films, the SAFC funded comedy Pacific Banana, and The Best of Friends. Gray co-wrote and sang the title song from Pacific Banana with fellow co-star Luan Peters.

== Music career (singing, writing, touring, recording and producing) ==
Gray's first record deal was with Laser Records, an Australian label. "Love Song of O" peaked at number 89 in Australia in January 1978.

In 1982, Gray left Australia to pursue music full time after being offered a record deal and a European tour in the pop duo “Trouble” with Coconut Records, a label of German record company Hansa. She had a European top 40 hit “No Time to Lose”, released the same year. Trouble’s next singles were “Ich Bin Trouble” and “Cosmetic”.

Gray recorded and toured with her bandmate Luan Peters in Europe throughout 1982 to 1983. She then returned to Australia in 1983 looking to build on the interest in her own solo material (by CBS/Sony New York) and by imagining a sophisticated visual and electronic duo alternative.

In 1983 Gray formed a musical partnership with fellow musician/producer Roy Nicolson who had returned from producing and writing in the UK. Gray composed and co-produced an albums’ worth of demos with Nicolson. She was signed along with Roy Nicolson by CBS Records Australia. They named their musical partnership ARVO. Their first pop album was entitled “Luna” and was produced at Paradise Studios Sydney and released in Australia 1984.

Gray moved to New York in 1986 to study jazz vocalisation and songwriting. She lived there for 9 years, performing in many of the known cabaret and jazz clubs (Maxims, Blue Note, Bradleys, The Supper Club, Tatou) and recording her first all original jazz CD featuring trumpeter Roy Hargrove.

Gray returned to Australia in 1996 and continued her jazz performing and recording . She released her new Jazz CD ”Still Got a Thing” in late 1997 through Creative Vibes Label in Australia and performed with her Jazz trio in Australia.

In 2005, Gray produced and hosted the documentary “Wish on a Spell”. She released a DVD internationally by leading American independent distributor Monterey Media, in mainstream stores throughout USA, Canada and Australia and through streaming. In 2007, Gray released her new Jazz CD “Jazz Fresh”.

Gray appeared in the FFC funded documentary hosted by American Pulp Fiction director Quentin Tarantino titled “Not Quite Hollywood”, a film homage to the breakthrough days of Australian films of the 70s and early 80s.

In 2018, there was renewed international interest from UK and European DJ’s in one of the album tracks “Bikini” and ARVO’s music was re-released internationally on vinyl along with a DJ remix and streaming through “Strangelove Records”.

== Author ==
Gray is an author with books published in Australia and overseas.

Her first book was with Athena Starwoman and published in September 1996 titled “How to Turn Your Ex-Boyfriend into a Toad: And Other Spells for Love, Wealth, Beauty, and Revenge”. This was followed by “The Nice Girl's Book of Naughty Spells: Get Rich, Get Lucky, Get Even” in October 1999, “Mini Book of Love Spells” in January 2000, “How To Turn Your Boyfriend Into a Love Slave : And Other Spells to Inspire Passion, Romance & Seduction” in January 2001, “Spells to Get Ahead Pack: All the Magic You Could Possibly Need in One Witchy Pack” in August 2002, “Glamazon: How to Be Fabulous, Famous And Flawless” with Athena Starwoman in January 2003, "How to be a Real Witch", “Kinky Couture” in September 2005, “Mind over Medicine Revealing the Blame Game” in 2011 and "How to Make Bad Things Happen to Awful People" published in the USA and Australia by Hampton Press in 2019. Gray was a contributing author to the academic medical book titled "Perspectives on Complementary and Alternative Medicines" edited by Professor Ian Olver (published by Imperial College Press).

Several of these books have been published in Spanish, German, Czech, and Portuguese.

Gray is also mentioned in two academic papers: Ritual-Design im rezenten Hexendiskurs : Transferprozesse und Konstruktionsformen von Ritualen auf Persönlichen Homepages by Kerstin Radde, and Reinventando tradições : representações e identidades da bruxaria neopagã no Brasil by Janluis Duarte.

Filmography

Title	Year	Role	Type
1979	Pacific Banana	Sally	Feature film released 1981
1982	The Best of Friends	Grace	Feature film
1989	Voyage of the Heart	Sally	Feature film, US
2008	Not Quite Hollywood: The Wild, Untold Story of Ozploitation!	Herself	Feature film documentary

Television

Title	Year	Role	Type
1977	Number 96	Miss Hemingway	TV series, 16 episodes
1977	Number 96: The Final Episode	Herself / Miss Hemingway	TV special
1979	The Young Doctors	Lana Maxwell	TV series, 6 episodes
1980	Kingswood Country	Susie	TV series, 1 episode
1980	Bellamy	Delilah	TV series, 1 episode 5. Swan Song
1980	Catch Us If You Can	Herself - Co-host with Bryan Davies	TV special
1981	Catch Us If You Can	Herself - Co-host with Bryan Davies	TV series, 30 Episodes
1982	The Australian Way	Herself	TV special
1982	After Dark	Herself - Guest with her band "Deborah Gray and the Flames"	TV series, 1 episode
1984	Play Your Cards Right	Herself - Co-host with Ugly Dave Gray	TV series
1984	Sounds	Herself with band 'Arvo'	TV series, 1 episode
1999; 2005	Good Morning Australia	Guest - Herself	TV series, 1 episode
2000	The Morning Show	Herself - Guest	TV series, 1 episode
2003	Mornings	Herself	TV series, 2 episodes
2005	Good Morning Australia	Herself	TV series, 1 episode
2005	Wish on a Spell	Host / Presenter	Video
2006	A Current Affair	Herself	TV series, 1 episode
2015	Sunrise	Guest - Herself	TV series, 1 episode
2016	Studio 10	Herself	TV series, 1 episode
