= Peter Birrel =

English actor

- Born: Peter Cohen (some sources cite Peter Birrel Cohen); 19 July 1935; Vienna, Austria
- Died: 23 June 2004 (aged 68); Bath, Somerset, England
- Occupation: Actor
- Spouse: Stephanie Cole (m. 1998)

Peter Birrel (né Peter Cohen; 19 July 1935 – 23 June 2004) was an English actor who played numerous parts on British television for nearly forty years.

Birrel appeared in the Doctor Who story Frontier in Space in 1973, as well as in the documentary I Was a "Doctor Who" Monster. He also appeared in the first series of Alexander the Greatest. His film credits included Freelance (1971), Arch of Triumph (1984), and the television miniseries Freud (1984), War and Remembrance (1988) and Around the World in 80 Days (1989). In 1979 he played a guest-role in George and Mildred as George's brother Charlie Roper in the episode A Military Pickle.

== Personal life ==
He married actress Stephanie Cole in 1998. She was widowed by his death from cancer in Bath, aged 68 in 2004.

== Filmography ==
Year	Title	Role	Notes
1971	Freelance	Jeff	
1974	Ransom	Pursuit Pilot	Uncredited
1979	The Great Riviera Bank Robbery	Senior Detective	
1984	Arch of Triumph	Wiesenthal	
1998	Gamal Abd El Naser		(final film role)
