= French Quarter (film) =

- Theatrical release poster
- Directed by: Dennis Kane
- Produced by: Tony Alatis; Dennis Kane; Herb Scheiderman
- Starring: Virginia Mayo; Bruce Davison; Alisha Fontaine; Ann Michelle; Lindsay Bloom; Vernel Bagneris; Anna Filamento
- Cinematography: Jerry Kalogeratos
- Edited by: Ed Fricke; George T. Norris
- Music by: Dick Hyman
- Release date: August 1978
- Running time: 101 min.
- Country: United States
- Language: English

French Quarter is a 1978 American drama film directed by Dennis Kane, and telling two parallel stories set in the red light area of New Orleans, one contemporary and one set at the turn of the century. The film has music composed by Dick Hyman.

The film stars Virginia Mayo, Bruce Davison, Alisha Fontaine, Ann Michelle and Lindsay Bloom in the lead roles, with Lance LeGault appearing uncredited.

== Cast ==
- Virginia Mayo as Countess Willie Piazza / Ida
- Bruce Davison as Kid Ross / Inspector Sordik
- Alisha Fontaine as Trudy Dix / Christine Delaplane
- Ann Michelle as Coke-Eyed Laura / Policewoman in French Hotel
- Lindsay Bloom as Big Butt Annie / Policewoman in Bar
- Vernel Bagneris as Jelly Roll / Policeman
- Anna Filamento as Madame Papaloos / Madame Beaudine
- Lance LeGault as Tom / Burt
