= Charles Hyatt =

Jamaican actor

Charles Hyatt OD
- Born: Charles Eglerton Hyatt; 14 February 1931; Kingston, Jamaica
- Died: 1 January 2007 (aged 75); Palm Bay, Florida, U.S.
- Occupations: Film, television actor, writer
- Years active: 1961–2007
- Spouse: Vera Hyatt
- Children: 4

Charles Eglerton Hyatt OD (14 February 1931 – 1 January 2007) was a Jamaican actor, playwright, director, author and broadcaster. Hyatt was best known as a character actor and comedian who appeared in numerous films and television shows, beginning in the 1960s.

== Early life ==
Hyatt was born in Kingston, Jamaica, to Herbert Hyatt, a taxi-driver, and Ruth Burke, a homemaker. He attended St Aloysious Boys' School and St Simon’s College.

== Career ==
After making his movie debut in the 1965 film A High Wind in Jamaica, Hyatt had notable performances in the films The Bushbaby (1969), Crossplot (1969), Freelance (1971), Love Thy Neighbour (1973), Club Paradise (1986), Milk and Honey (1988), The Mighty Quinn (1989), Cool Runnings (1993) and Almost Heaven (2005).

Hyatt was the recipient of Jamaica's national honour of Order of Distinction (OD), and was awarded the Institute of Jamaica Centenary Medal and the silver Musgrave Medal.

== Personal life ==
Hyatt was married to Vera Hyatt, an art historian, museologist, and former Deputy Director of the National Gallery of Jamaica. They had three children together, including Charlene Hyatt, now known as the actress Michael Hyatt. The marriage ended in divorce.

Hyatt then married Marjorie Hyatt. Hyatt died in Florida, United States, of lung cancer on 1 January 2007.

== Partial filmography ==
- A High Wind in Jamaica (1965) – Pirate
- The Bushbaby (1969) – Gideon
- Crossplot (1969) – President Maudula
- Freelance (1971) – McNair
- Love Thy Neighbour (1973) – Joe Reynolds
- The Marijuana Affair (1975)
- Club Paradise (1986) – Mr. Banks
- Milk and Honey (1988) – Village Preacher
- The Mighty Quinn (1989) – Security Guard
- Cool Runnings (1993) – Whitby Bevil – Sr.
- Almost Heaven (2005) – Doctor (final film role)
