= The Bite (miniseries) =

1996 mini series

- Written by: Terry Johnson
- Directed by: Michael Carson
- Starring: Hugo Weaving; Lesley Manville; Pamela Rabe
- Country of origin: Australia
- Original language: English
- No. of episodes: 2

Production
- Running time: 90 minutes

Original release
- Network: ABC
- Release: 17 April 1996 – 1996

The Bite is a 1996 miniseries about an Australian adventurer who moves to Asia with his new wife. Ellie and Jack Shannon start a jewellery business in Burma, which is renowned for its rubies but is also one of the corners of the infamous heroin ‘Golden Triangle’. Things turn sinister when one of their biggest customers, Samira Nazib, reveals that drug-trafficking is the true nature of their business. The Shannons spy on her and her partner for the Australian Federal Police.

== Production ==
This Australian-British co-production was shot 21 September to 30 November 1995 in Australia and Thailand. It was written by Terry Johnson and directed by Michael Carson. The producers were Lavinia Warner and David Elfick, with Executive Producers Sue Masters and Michael Wearing.

== Cast ==
- Hugo Weaving
- Lesley Manville
- Keith Allen
- Pamela Rabe
- Frank Gallagher as Larry Schofield
- Rebekah Jaye
- Shane Connor as Thompson
