= Not Tonight, Darling =

1971 film by Anthony Sloman

- Theatrical release poster
- Directed by: Anthony Sloman
- Screenplay by: James Pillock
- Story by: Christopher Gregory
- Produced by: John M. Taylor
- Starring: Luan Peters; Vincent Ball
- Cinematography: Harry Waxman
- Edited by: Ean Wood
- Music by: Denis King
- Production company: Mintdene Film Productions
- Release date: 1 December 1971
- Running time: 86 minutes
- Country: United Kingdom
- Language: English

Not Tonight, Darling (also known as Not Tonight, Darling! and Not Now, Darling) is a 1971 British drama film directed by Anthony Sloman and starring Luan Peters and Vincent Ball. It was written by James Pillock.

== Plot ==
Karen Williams is bored with her comfortable suburban life and her solicitor husband John who ignores her after six years of marriage. She falls for fast-talking businessman Alex, and becomes involved in a seedy world of blackmail and sex.

== Cast ==
- Luan Peters as Karen Williams
- Vincent Ball as Alex
- Jason Twelvetrees as John Williams
- James Hayter as Mr Finlay
- Bill Shine as Captain Harrison
- Sean Barry as Eddie
- Nicki Howorth as Joan
- Lance Barrett as Gary Williams
- Fiona Richmond as Susanne (credited as Amber Harrison)
- Michael O'Malley as Ben the Click
- Carol Catkin as Jill
- The Tiffany Sisters as speciality act in strip club
- John Gillett as guest in strip club
- David Nimmo as guest in the club
- Victor Schonfield as guest in strip club
- David Vorhaus as George
- Patti Walby as Anna
- Jay Lee as Bill
- Jenny D'arcey as Celeste
- Sue Calder as Three
- Thunderclap Newman as themselves
- Sean Redmayne as announcer in strip club
- Olwen Griffiths as dubbed voice of Joan

== Critical reception ==
The Monthly Film Bulletin wrote: "A miserable piece of British sexploitation, from which the sex itself has been all but censored away. The dross that remains – a ritual of mooning about from bathroom to bedroom to nightclub – tests endurance to the utmost. Luan Peters' performance as Karen just about rises above its essentially shabby context."

Kine Weekly wrote: "A routine little tale without any particular distinction, this will get by with the uncritical. ... The film falls short of quality on several counts. The plot itself is novelettish and the characters are, at the best, only stout cardboard, that of the stuffy young husband, John, being incredibly stupid. Jason Twelvetrees plays this unplayable part bravely without blanching at some dreadful lines, but he and his colleagues are not helped by direction that leaves no point unsharpened. Luan Peters creates some sympathy as the wife who goes off the rails, and Vincent Ball gives the best conviction to the nasty habits of Alex."
