= Michael Carson (television director) =

Australian television director (1947–2005)

- Born: June 14, 1947; Sydney, New South Wales, Australia
- Died: May 14, 2005 (aged 57); Castlecrag, New South Wales, Australia
- Occupation: Television director
- Spouse: Sandra Levy (divorced)
- Partner: Jacqui Delmege
- Children: 1

Michael Carson (14 June 1947 – 14 May 2005) was an Australian television director who was responsible for some of Australia's most significant series in the last decades of the twentieth century. His work as a director, producer and script editor was recognised with AFI Awards, Logie Awards, Penguin Awards and AWGIE Awards.

== Life and career ==
Carson was born in Sydney, Australia, and attended North Sydney Boys High School. He commenced work in the television industry as a studio hand and did all his training on the job. He started work with the Australia's national broadcaster, the ABC, in the early 1970s. His first directing jobs included the rock 'n roll music programme GTK, which combined live performances and interviews with cutting-edge bands and performers.

He married television producer and director Sandra Levy in the 1970s, and in 1980 they had a son, Simon. They later divorced but maintained close ties.

Carson was Course Director for screen acting at Australia's NIDA from 2000 to 2003.

He left the ABC to work freelance in 1990. In his post-ABC years Carson directed for such companies as Barron Television, Jonathan M. Shiff Productions, and Southern Star Xanadu. He died of pancreatic cancer in Sydney in 2005.

== Style and achievements ==
Carson was responsible for "an extraordinary range of drama during his years with the ABC, the standout probably being Scales of Justice which he conceived, developed and produced". It was made during his "message era" years, and it was "a three-part expose of police corruption". In its published form it became a high-school text. In the 1990s, he was the establishing director for Police Rescue, Phoenix and Janus. Carson himself claimed his peak productions were the first episodes of Janus (1994) and the popular series SeaChange, in which he cast Sigrid Thornton and David Wenham.

Internationally, Carson's work was recognised with Scales of Justice being accepted into official competition at BANFF (Canada) and Jackaroo receiving the New York Film & TV Festival Bronze Award.

Australian playwright Alex Buzo praised Carson for his "tremendous affinity with characters and the actors who played them". Australian actors Sigrid Thornton and Colin Friels also praised Carson's "sensitive handling" of actors. This is regarded as unusual in a director who came "up from the floor".

== Awards and recognition ==
- 1992: AFI Award for Best Episode in a TV Drama for Phoenix. Hard Ball. Nominated for Best Director
- 1993: AFI Award for Best Achievement in Direction in a Television Drama for Police Rescue. Whirlwind
- 2005: Australian Screen Directors Association (ASDA): posthumous accreditation recognising lifetime achievement

== Filmography ==
- Loss of Innocence (1978, co-director, four-part drama)
- A Place in the World (1979, co-director, six-part drama)
- Coralie Lansdowne Says No (1980, director, telefeature)
- Going Home (1980, director)
- Intimate Strangers (1980, director, two-part drama)
- The Timeless Land (1980, co-director, eight-part miniseries)
- Scales of Justice (1983, producer, three self-contained telemovies)
- Crime of the Decade (1984, producer)
- Mail Order Bride (1984, producer)
- Man of Letters (1984, producer)
- Natural Causes (1985, director and producer, telefeature)
- Times Raging (1984, producer)
- White Man's Legend (1984, producer)
- The Petrov Affair (1987, director, docudrama)
- Peter and Pompey (1988, director, telefeature – in Touch the Sun series)
- The Australians (1988, co-director, drama series)
- Jackaroo (1990, director, two-part drama)
- Police Rescue: The Movie (1993, director)
- Damnation of Harvey McHugh (1994, co-director, television series)
- Janus (1994, director, television series)
- Halifax F.P.: Hard Cops (1995, director, telefeature – fifth in Halifax F.P. series)
- Naked (1995, co-director, three-part television drama)
- Old Flames (1995, director)
- The Bite (1996, director, two-part miniseries)
- The Devil Game (1997, director and writer)
- Driven Crazy (1998, co-director, television series)
- Time and Tide (1999, director)
- Corridors of Power (2001, director, six-part miniseries)
- Cybergirl (2001, co-director, children's television series)
- Horace and Tina (2001, director: 4 episodes, television series)
