= Anthony Sloman =

English film producer and screenwriter

- Born: Anthony B. Sloman; 6 May 1945 (age 81); Waltham Abbey, Essex, England, UK
- Other name: Tony Sloman
- Occupation: Film critic
- Spouse: Simone Posner (m. 1977)
- Children: Jonathan and David

Anthony B. Sloman (born 6 May 1945 in Waltham Abbey, Essex) is an English film producer and screenwriter.

Tony Sloman is a cinema critic and historian, whose long career has encompassed many facets of film making. He has worked intermittently in the film and television industry since 1964, as an actor, director, editor, sound editor, production manager, producer and screenwriter.

In the 1970s he directed two British sex drama films – Not Tonight, Darling (1971) and Foursome (1971).

He has written a regular internet film column, "Sunset and Wardour" for the "International Film Studio" and he also contributes film criticism for the BBC weekly listings magazine Radio Times. He once finished second on the BBC quiz programme "Film Buff of the Year". He is a longtime member of the National Film Theatre for whom he has served several terms as a governor of the British Film Institute. He has also programmed several retrospectives for the National Film Theatre.

Sloman has interviewed such figures as Sir David Lean, Ann Miller and Stanley Donen for the Guardian Interview series. He has also written many obituaries of film figures for The Independent.

In 2021, his memoirs, entitled Reel Life – An Autobiocine Memoir, were published by Quoit Media Limited.
