= Freelance (1971 film) =

1971 British film by Francis Megahy

- Directed by: Francis Megahy
- Written by: Francis Megahy; Bernie Cooper
- Produced by: Francis Megahy executive Lynn S. Raynor; Ronan O'Casey
- Starring: Ian McShane; Gayle Hunnicutt; Keith Barron; Alan Lake; Peter Gilmore; Luan Peters
- Cinematography: Norman Langley
- Edited by: Arthur Solomon
- Music by: Basil Kirchin
- Distributed by: Commonwealth United Entertainment
- Release date: 1971
- Running time: 91 minutes
- Country: United Kingdom
- Language: English
- Budget: £200,000

Freelance (US title: Con Man) is a 1971 British thriller film directed by Francis Megahy and starring Ian McShane. It was written by Megahy and Bernie Cooper. It was not released in England until 1976. A con artist witnesses an assassination.

== Plot ==
Mitch is a small-time London con-artist. When he witnesses a gangland hit, he is forced to lie low while trying to carry out his own various schemes.

== Cast ==
- Ian McShane as Mitch
- Gayle Hunnicutt as Chris
- Keith Barron as Gary
- Alan Lake as Dean
- Peter Gilmore as Boss
- Luan Peters as Rosemary
- Peter Birrel as Jeff
- Elizabeth Proud as Gwen
- Charles Hyatt as McNair
- John Hollis as Hartley

== Production ==
Filming began in London in October 1969. It was Ian MacShane's fourth lead role of the year, following Tam Lin (1970), Battle of Britain (1969), and Pussycat, Pussycat, I Love You (1970).

== Reception ==
The Monthly Film Bulletin wrote: "Workmanlike but thoroughly routine crime drama, whose somewhat dog-eared message is that crime doesn't pay. There is too much chit-chat and – even given the brevity of the film – too many scenes which have little evident purpose. The action, however, is capably managed, and the standard of performances and production is high enough to make one wish that the talent involved had been put to more imaginative use."

The Cambridge Evening News called it "a film of such ordinariness that one wonders how it ever got to be made."
