= Noorderzon =

Festival in Groningen, Netherlands

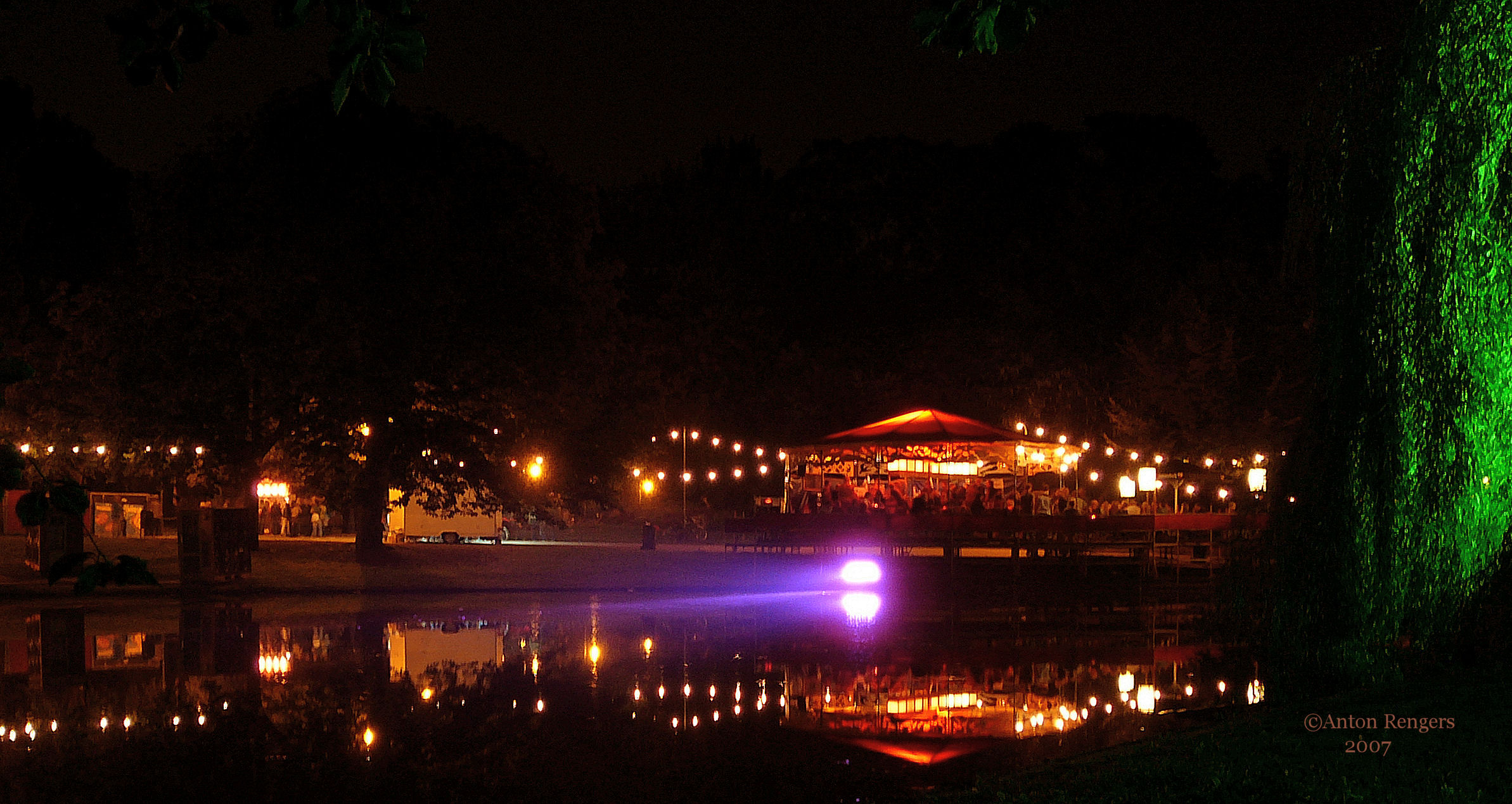
Noorderzon in 2007

The Noorderzon Festival is an annual festival in the Dutch city of Groningen taking place in the urban public park the Noorderplantsoen, usually for a period of eleven days beginning in the third week of August. The festival typically draws between 130,000 and 150,000 visitors.

The festival started out as a small music festival and a subsidiary of De Parade but has expanded to a festival where art, music, dance and theatre go together. Performances are shown in tents, on the street and in cultural venues in Groningen's inner city. There is a strong emphasis on international work, and on the cross-fertilization between theatre and other performing arts.

The 2020 edition takes place from 13 till 23 August.
