= Malpractice (film) =

1989 film

- Directed by: Bill Bennett
- Written by: Bill Bennett
- Produced by: Tristram Miall; Bruce Moir
- Starring: Caz Lederman
- Cinematography: Steve Arnold
- Edited by: Denise Hunter
- Production company: Film Australia
- Release dates: 1989 (Cannes); 12 September 1990 (Australia)
- Running time: 94 minutes
- Country: Australia
- Language: English
- Budget: $900,000

Malpractice is a 1989 Australian drama film directed by Bill Bennett.

== Plot ==
Coral and Doug Davis are an ordinary couple whose third child suffers brain damage during a complicated hospital birth. Coral believes that the injuries resulted from the attending doctor’s mishandling of the delivery, particularly his disagreement with the midwife over the appropriate procedure. Determined to establish what happened, Coral decides to takes legal action against Dr Frank Harrison.

As the case progresses, the family becomes caught up in the emotional and legal complexities of pursuing a medical negligence claim. Doug is reluctant to pursue the matter publicly, while Coral seeks accountability for the injuries suffered by their child. The dispute ultimately comes before a medical tribunal, which must determine whether the doctor’s actions constituted malpractice.

== Cast ==
- Caz Lederman as Coral Davis
- Bob Baines as Doug Davis
- Ian Gilmour as Dr. Frank Harrison
- Pat Thomson as Sister Margaret Beattie
- Charles Little as Dr. Tom Cotterslow
- Dorothy Alison as Maureen Davis
- Janet Stanley as Sister Diane Shaw
- Rebecca Frith as Sister Pam Elliot

== Production ==
The film was one of a series of drama documentaries produced at Film Australia for the Nine Network, dealing with social issues. It was filmed using hand held cameras. The actors improvised their parts based on detailed research and had real people in supporting roles as professionals.

Bennett says the making of the film was extremely emotional and it remains one of his favourite films.

== Release ==
The film was selected to premiere in the Un Certain Regard section at the 1989 Cannes Film Festival. It also screened at numerous international film festivals including Dublin Film Festival, Monte-Carlo Television Festival, Montreal World Film Festival, Vancouver International Film Festival, Seattle International Film Festival and International Film Festival of India.

== Reception ==
Marke Andrews of the Vancouver Sun gave the film 4 stars and said "Bennett never manipulates our emotions with melodrama; the sight of a tiny infant going into a brain scan machine is devastating enough."

Harlan Kennedy of Film Comment described Bennett’s production as an impressive example of documentary-style filmmaking, saying “Bill Bennett’s electrifying docudrama Malpractice (1989), about a botched delivery in a hospital maternity ward, so powerfully blurs the line between fact and fiction that we hardly know who’s an actor and who isn’t, or where the script stops and the improvisation begins.”

Time Out magazine described the film as "strong and compelling", praising Bennett’s direction, the documentary-style cinematography and the performances. They wrote: “Bennett has produced an immensely impressive film which explores the emotional and legal consequences.”

== Awards ==
Year	Award	Category	Result	Ref
1989	Australian Film Institute Awards	Best Actress (Pat Thomson)	Won	
1989	Australian Cinematographers Society Awards	National Merit Award (Steve Arnold)	Won	
