= Haunted (1977 film) =

- Theatrical poster
- Directed by: Michael DeGaetano
- Written by: Michael DeGaetano
- Produced by: Michael DeGaetano; Nicholas P. Nizich
- Starring: Aldo Ray; Virginia Mayo; Ann Michelle
- Cinematography: William E. Hines
- Edited by: Jack Hofstra
- Music by: Lor Crane
- Distributed by: Big Apple Releasing
- Release date: March 4, 1977
- Running time: 85 minutes
- Country: United States
- Language: English
- Budget: US$250,000

Haunted (also released as The Haunted) is a 1977 American supernatural horror film written and directed by Michael DeGaetano and starring Aldo Ray, Virginia Mayo, and Ann Michelle.

== Plot ==
In an Arizona community during the Civil War, a young Native American woman, Abanaki, is falsely accused of witchcraft and forced out into the desert to die.

Decades later, college student Patrick and his younger brother Russell are spending the summer with their widowed mother Michelle at the site of the former community, which they are renovating into a movie ranch tourist attraction. Michelle has recently gone blind, and her propensity for superstitious fantasies perturbs Andrew, the brother of her deceased husband who is protective of the property. One afternoon, a telephone company installs a phone booth in the small cemetery on the ranch.

Jennifer Baines, a young British woman, passes through the town when her car breaks down and is towed. Michelle and Patrick insist that Jennifer spend the night on the ranch before returning to obtain her car in Phoenix. Patrick recounts to Jennifer the origins of the town, including a tale of how a corrupt preacher stole gold from the Native Americans and hid the treasure in the Superstition Mountains.

At dinner, Michelle rants about Abenaki, and claims the car accident that killed her husband and resulted in her blindness was caused by Abenaki's curse. Exasperated by his mother's deteriorating mental state, Patrick declares that he is having her committed to a psychiatric hospital in Phoenix. The next morning, Patrick departs with Jennifer and Michelle, leaving Russell and Andrew behind at the ranch.

That night, Andrew gets drunk and disturbs patrons of a local saloon. Meanwhile, after leaving Michelle at the hospital, Patrick and Jennifer sped the night camping in the desert and have sex. Back at the ranch, Andrew begins receiving mysterious phone calls from the newly-installed phone booth. The woman's voice on the other end instructs him to venture into the mountains to locate the gold. Andrew departs in the middle of the night by boat along a river that winds into the mountains to meet with Prosperina, a Native American seer, to seek guidance. Prosperina suggests that Jennifer is a reincarnation of Abanaki. When Prosperina demands that Andrew give her a share of the gold, he angrily strangles her to death.

Patrick and Jennifer return to the ranch, where Jennifer uncovers newspaper clipping about the various tragedies that have befallen Patrick and Russell's family. Andrew arrives suddenly and attacks Jennifer, accusing her of being Abanaki. He binds and gags her, and confesses to having caused the accident that killed his brother out of jealousy. At nightfall, Patrick and Russell depart to search for Jennifer, unaware she is being held captive by Andrew. She manages to escape, and is chased by Andrew through the ranch.

Jennifer attempts to call police from the phone booth in the cemetery, but is taunted by Andrew, who manages to break inside before Jennifer stabs him with a sharpened stick. When he pulls the stick out of his chest, he strikes a lightbulb in the phone booth that explodes and sets him on fire, burning him to death. Patrick and Russell arrive moments later, and Jennifer collapses.

Some time later, Patrick and Russell depart the ranch, as does Jennifer, who goes on her own, despite Patrick expressing his love for her. Meanwhile, Abanaki's spirit is seen wandering on horseback through the nearby desert.

== Cast ==
- Aldo Ray as Andrew
- Virginia Mayo as Michelle
- Ann Michelle as Abanaki / Jennifer Baines
- Jim Negele as Patrick
- Brad Rearden as Russell
- Fred Carroll as Steiner / Bartender
- June Ely as Prosperina
- Carl Belfor as Mechanic

== Production ==
Haunted was filmed on location in Arizona over a period of 24 days on a budget of $250,000. According to writer-director De Gaetano, budgeting issues necessitated that portions of the script be un-filmed, resulting in "a good deal of the philosophical depth of the film" disappearing.

== Release ==
Haunted was released theatrically in the United States, beginning on March 4, 1977 in Florence, South Carolina. Contemporaneous newspaper sources show had a limited engagement screening in Salem, Oregon in late-March 1977.

In the United States, the film was released on VHS under the title The Haunted on March 20, 1992.
