= Athena Starwoman =

Australian astrologer (1945–2004)

- Born: 17 July 1945; Prahran, Victoria, Australia
- Died: 16 December 2004 (aged 59); Gold Coast, Queensland, Australia
- Other names: Miss Starwoman, Athena Demartina (her married name)
- Occupations: Media Astrologer; publisher; internet businesswoman; columnist
- Spouse: Dr John Demartini (married 1995–2004; her death)

Athena Starwoman (17 July 1945 – 16 December 2004), real name Athena Demartini, also known internationally as Miss Starwoman.

She was known as a media astrologer as well as for her magazine columns, books, and her radio and television appearances; she also had a hotline and online astrology business.

== Biography ==
Starwoman was born in Prahran, Victoria, to a housewife mother and engineer father. Her grandmother had been a psychic and mystic, as well as her sister and nieces. After studying astrology in Los Angeles in the 1970s, she returned to Australia and wrote for The Daily Telegraph newspaper from 1978 and 1988, and she also had a regular column in Woman's Day magazine.

During her final years, she divided her time between a luxury apartment at Broadbeach on the Gold Coast in Queensland and a US$3,000,000 apartment on the cruise liner The World, which she purchased after selling an apartment in New York's Trump Tower. She was married to self-help guru John Demartini. Starwoman died on 16 December 2004 from breast cancer.

== Publications (selected) ==
| Title | Year Published |
| Star Struck | 1980 |
| Glamazon (with Deborah Gray) | 2003 |
| How To Turn Your Ex-Boyfriend Into A Toad (with Deborah Gray) | 1996 |
| Zodiac: Your Astrology Guide for the New Millennium | 2000 |
| Soulmates and the Zodiac | 2003 |
