= Caz Lederman =

Australian actress

- Born: Margaret Lederman c. 1951/1952
- Died: prior to 2023
- Education: University of New South Wales
- Occupation: Actress
- Years active: 1974–2002
- Known for: Malpractice (1989); Holiday Island (1981-1982)

Margaret "Caz" Lederman (born c.1951/1952-prior to 2023), was an Australian former actress.

== Early life ==
Lederman was born c. 1951/1952 in Viennese parents, who had emigrated to Australia and was Jewish

She grew up on Sydney's, North Shore district and studied at the University of New South Wales, whilst taking on early stage roles as a means to pay for her education.

== Career ==
Lederman's acting career began with television commercials and bit parts in tv dramas and soap operas. She made her live debut in Tilly Devine at NIDA’s Jane Street Theatre, before spending two years working in Europe, North America and Israel.

In 1978, she starred in the comedy play Father's Day in Sydney and Melbourne, alongside Carole Cook and Anne Haddy.

Lederman appeared in numerous film and television series, including Silent Number and Young Doctors and both the film and TV versions of Number 96. She played a lead role in the Crawford Productions early 1980s TV series Holiday Island.

Her feature film and tv movie credits include thriller The Killing of Angel Street (1981), drama Winter of Our Dreams (1981), Undercover (1983), The Boy Who Had Everything (1984) and crime film Grievous Bodily Harm (1988).

She was nominated for the 1989 AFI Award for Best Lead Actress in a Telefeature for her role in 1989 drama film Malpractice.

== Personal life ==
Lederman is married to actor Bill Summers.

She was a practising Jew, and according to Jewish records, which cite her birth name as Margaret Lederman, she died sometime prior to 2023, although this has not been independently verified by the media.

== Filmography ==
=== Film ===
Year	Title	Role	Type
1974	Number 96	Bikie chick (uncredited)	Feature film
1981	Winter of Our Dreams	Jenny	Feature film
1981	The Killing of Angel Street	Nancy	Feature film
1981	A Slice of Life	Sally	Feature film
1983	Undercover	May	Feature film
1984	Tail of a Tiger	Lydia	Feature film
1985	The Boy Who Had Everything	First Prostitute	Feature film
1987	Belinda	Rhonda	Feature film
1988	Grievous Bodily Harm	Vivian Enderby	Feature film
1990	Deadly	Irene	Feature film
1991	Fatal Bond	Detective Chenko	Feature film

=== Television ===
Year	Title	Role	Type
1977	The Young Doctors	Policewoman	2 episodes
1978	The Young Doctors	Beverley Adler	Guest role
1979	Cop Shop	Cathy Mercer	2 episodes
1980	Spring & Fall		1 episode
1981–1982	Holiday Island	Angela Scott	64 episodes
1982, 1991, 1993	A Country Practice	Daphne Jones / Anne Finlay / Betty Hartley	5 episodes
1984	Kindred Spirits	Amber	TV film
1989	Malpractice	Coral Davis	TV film
1989	E Street	Jackie Morris	4 episodes
1989–1990	Fresh Start	Kerry	TV series
1990	Ring of Scorpio	Pauline	Miniseries, 2 episodes
1990	More Winners: The Big Wish	C.W.'s Mum	TV film
1991	Chances	Jennifer Parsons	1 episode
1992	Cluedo	Janet Tipple	1 episode
1992	G.P.	Mrs. Saleh	1 episode
1995	Heartbreak High	Patricia	1 episode
2001	Water Rats	Marie James	1 episode
2001	The Finder	Judy Wheelen	TV film
2001	Cold Feet	Real Estate Agent	1 episode
2002	All Saints	Catherine Chadwick	1 episode

== Theatre ==
Year	Title	Role	Type
	Tilly Devine		Jane St Theatre, Sydney with NIDA
1978	Father's Day	Estelle	Mayfair Theatre, Sydney, Total Theatre, Melbourne with Stuart Wagstaff Enterprises
1979	Blinky Bill		New South Wales tour
1980	The Imaginary Invalid	Angelique / Louison	Playhouse, Newcastle with Hunter Valley Theatre Company
1980	Travelling North	Helen	Civic Playhouse, Newcastle with Hunter Valley Theatre Company
1980	Henry IV, Part 1		University of Newcastle with Hunter Valley Theatre Company
1980	Brecht on Brecht		Playhouse, Newcastle with Hunter Valley Theatre Company
1980	Bedroom Farce	Susannah	Newcastle Civic Theatre with Hunter Valley Theatre Company
1980	The Star Show: Tonite Heroes, Tomorrow Forgotten	Merle	Civic Playhouse, Newcastle with Hunter Valley Theatre Company
1985	In the Sweet Bye and Bye		Ensemble Theatre, Sydney
