= Intimate Strangers (miniseries) =

- Based on: Intimate Strangers by Katharine Susannah Prichard
- Written by: Judith Bell; Brian Bell
- Directed by: Michael Carson
- Starring: Carmen Duncan; Kit Taylor; Tony Bonner
- Country of origin: Australia
- Original language: English
- No. of episodes: 2 x 1 hours

Production
- Producer: Michael Carson

Original release
- Network: ABC
- Release: 12 July 1981

Intimate Strangers is an Australian mini series about a married couple put at risk when both parties become infatuated with other people.

== Cast ==
- Carmen Duncan as Elodie Blackwood
- Kit Taylor as Greg Blackwood
- Lulu Pinkus as Dirk
- Tony Bonner as Jerome Hartog
- John O'Brien as Tony Maretti
- Jennifer Claire as Ray
- Oriana Panozzo as Chrissie

== Reception ==
Greg Shelley of The Sydney Morning Herald says it "is, for part one at least, rather slow. The pace quickens in episode two." and writes "Intimate Strangers is saved by the acting of Carmen Duncan as Elodie." Don Groves in the Sun-Herald says "Boredom does threaten in the first 15 minutes or so of Strangers but, happily, the pace quickens, a modicum of tension builds and an ounce or two of emotion is judiciously added." The Age's Barbara Hooks states "the script is shot through with cliches and non-sequiturs which do little to marry a series of unconvincing characters and disjointed scenes." Marion McDonald of the Sydney Morning Herald noted it was unlucky to run at the same time as A Town Like Alice and said "The first episode slow and uneven and there was one ridiculous scene, again reminiscent of opera, where the major characters popped in and out of a clearing, imparting vital bits of the story. I read somewhere that the second and last episode picks up pace, which is a good thing because while the elegiac mood may be well suited to the time and the social setting. I doubt that it will sustain our interest in a set of characters who, apart from Duncan, are neither believable nor engaging."
