= Pacific Banana =

- Cover of DVD reissue
- Directed by: John D. Lamond
- Written by: Alan Hopgood
- Based on: idea by John D. Lamond
- Produced by: John D. Lamond
- Starring: Graeme Blundell; Robin Stewart; Deborah Gray
- Cinematography: Gary Wapshott
- Production company: Pacific Banana Pty Ltd
- Distributed by: Roadshow
- Release date: 1981
- Running time: 82 minutes
- Country: Australia
- Language: English
- Budget: $230,000

Pacific Banana is a 1981 Australian sex comedy film which reunites the star and writer of Alvin Purple.

== Plot ==
Martin is a pilot who sneezes whenever he is aroused and loses an erection. He works for an airline owned by Sir Harry Blandings, whose wife tries to seduce Martin but then claims he made a move on her. Blandings sacks him but gets him a job at broken down Banana Airlines, where he flies with handsome Paul, who sleeps around despite being engaged to two sexy airline hostesses, Sally and Mandy.

Martin makes several attempts to have sex, but constantly fails to get an erection, even with the help of the beautiful Candy Bubbles and her female friends. Paul constantly cheats on Sally and Mandy but they keep going back to him. Martin is constantly chased by Blandings' schoolgirl daughter, Julia. Eventually, Julia tells Martin she loves him which cures his impotence and he is able to have sex.

== Cast ==
- Graeme Blundell as Martin
- Robin Stewart as Paul
- Deborah Gray as Sally
- Alyson Best as Mandy
- Helen Hemingway as Julia Blandings
- Manuia Taie as Laya
- Luan Peters as Candy Bubbles
- Audine Leith as Lady Blandings
- Graham Duckett as Banana Airlines Passenger
- Alan Hopgood as Sir Harry Blandings

== Production ==
John Lamond had been impressed with the script for Alvin Purple (1973) and approached its original writer, Alan Hopgood with the idea of making a comedy about a broken down airline in the style of the Carry On films. Hopgood thought it was a good idea which could have led to a long-running series of comedies set in exotic locations around the world, with titles like Tokyo Banana and Guyana Banana. Lamond wanted to cast two English actors, Robin Stewart and Luan Peters, to give the movie more of a Carry On feel.

The film was funded by the South Australian Film Corporation. According to Lamond, this led to the film being toned down when it should have been more like Alvin Purple.

The movie was shot immediately before Nightmares (1980), also from Lamond, and edited at the same time. Filming took place at Odeon Theatre in Norwood, South Australia, Norwood Studios, Adelaide, and Tahiti. Lamond later said he wished the island scenes had been shot in Queensland "because when you go overseas with a low budget, people want to stay in nice places and you can see the money going out the door. Just in overheads." But filming in Tahiti was a requirement of some of the investors. Lamond says the three-week shoot on the island was tough because the weather was hot and the location was isolated, making the cast and crew go stir crazy.

Deborah Gray and Luan Peters wrote a theme song for fun during the shoot and Lamond liked it so much he decided to use it in the film.

== Reception ==
The film was not a commercial success. Alan Hogood felt the film departed from his original concept, becoming more slapstick orientated. Lamond believed he should have made the movie sexier.

Film Historian Brian McFarlane names the film as one of an "appalling bunch of sex comedies... sex is the recurring subject of a witless, numbing jokiness." He also describes the film as "puerile smut".
