= Ian Gilmour (actor) =

New Zealand-born actor and director

- Born: New Zealand
- Education: Australian Film, Television and Radio School
- Occupations: Actor and director
- Known for: Close to Home; Prisoner

Ian Gilmour is a New Zealand-born actor and director who has worked mostly in Australia.

== Career ==
=== Acting ===
Gilmour has acted in several Australian television series, most notably as Kevin Burns in Prisoner in 1980. Other credits include The Box, Chopper Squad, Kingswood Country, Waterloo Station, A Country Practice and The Flying Doctors.

Gilmour's early film credits include Fred Schepisi’s The Chant of Jimmie Blacksmith (1978), John Duigan’s Mouth to Mouth (1978) and The Odd Angry Shot (1979). His film work continued in the 1980s with Silver City (1984), The Coca-Cola Kid (1985) alongside American actor Eric Roberts and Malpractice (1989). He also appeared in the 1988 Fred Schepisi drama Evil Angels (a.k.a. A Cry in the Dark), which documented the true story of Lindy Chamberlain and the disappearance of Azaria Chamberlain, opposite Meryl Streep and Sam Neill.

=== Directing ===
Gilmour subsequently moved away from acting to become a director. He was selected from over a thousand applicants to study at the Australian Film, Television and Radio School specialising in Screen Direction. After completing his diploma, he went into pre-production on the 1985 TV movie Double Sculls, starring Chris Haywood.

In 1992, Gilmour was the set up director on Black Beauty, which received the International TV Programmers' Award at the 1994 New York Festival. He next directed the 1993 pilot for the series Newlyweds. His subsequent work included Tales of the South Seas, TV movie Code Red (2001) and fantasy series BeastMaster (1999) and The Lost World (1999). He directed the 2002 award-winning miniseries Bootleg, three episodes of multi-award winning children's series Mortified and two 'Movies of the Week' for the Sci Fi Network. He also created and directed the 2006 film Magma: Volcanic Disaster, about a volcanic disaster.

Other directorial credits in television include: The Flying Doctors, Heartbreak High, Water Rats, McLeod's Daughters, Flipper, Phoenix and Home and Away, as well as the miniseries Snowy and Bordertown.

== Filmography ==
=== Film ===
Year	Title	Role	Notes
1978	The Chant of Jimmie Blacksmith	Eddie	Feature film
1978	Mouth to Mouth	Tim	Feature film
1979	The Odd Angry Shot	Scott	Feature film
1979	Now and Then	Garry	Film
1979	Just Out of Reach	Steve	Feature film
1982	Going Down	Shadow	Feature film
1982	A Dangerous Summer	Steve Adams	Feature film
1983	Undercover	Simmo	Feature film
1984	One Night Stand	Sharon's Ex-boyfriend	Feature film
1984	Silver City	Barman	Feature film
1985	The Coca-Cola Kid	Marjorie	Feature film
1985	The Boy Who Had Everything	Pollock	Feature film
1988	The First Kangaroos	Steamship Official	Feature film
1988	Evil Angels (a.k.a. A Cry in the Dark)	John Buckland	Feature film
1989	Malpractice	Dr Frank Harrison	Feature film
2012	Careless Love	Detective	Feature film

=== Television ===
Year	Title	Role	Notes
1975	Close to Home	Alan Hearte	782 episodes
1977	The Sullivans	Young German	4 episodes
1978	Chopper Squad	Jeff	1 episode
1979	Ride on Stranger	Freddy	Miniseries, 1 episode
1979	A Place in the World		Miniseries
1979–1980	Cop Shop	Brett Summers / Russell Hewitt / David Griffin	6 episodes
1980	Lawson's Mates	Jim	1 episode
1980	Spring & Fall	Phil O'Donohue	1 episode
1980	Prisoner	Kevin Burns	22 episodes
1982	Kingswood Country	Troy Bridges	1 episode
1983	Waterloo Station		
1982–1987	A Country Practice	Commercial Director / Donald Cook / Spike	6 episodes
1987	Room to Move	Second Policeman	TV movie
1987	The Flying Doctors	Colin Neilson	1 episode
1989	E Street	Terry O'Brien	1 episode

== Personal life ==
Gilmour lives in Sydney, Australia with his wife and son.
