= Noorderplantsoen =

Park in Groningen, the Netherlands

Coordinates: 53°13′25″N 6°33′20″E

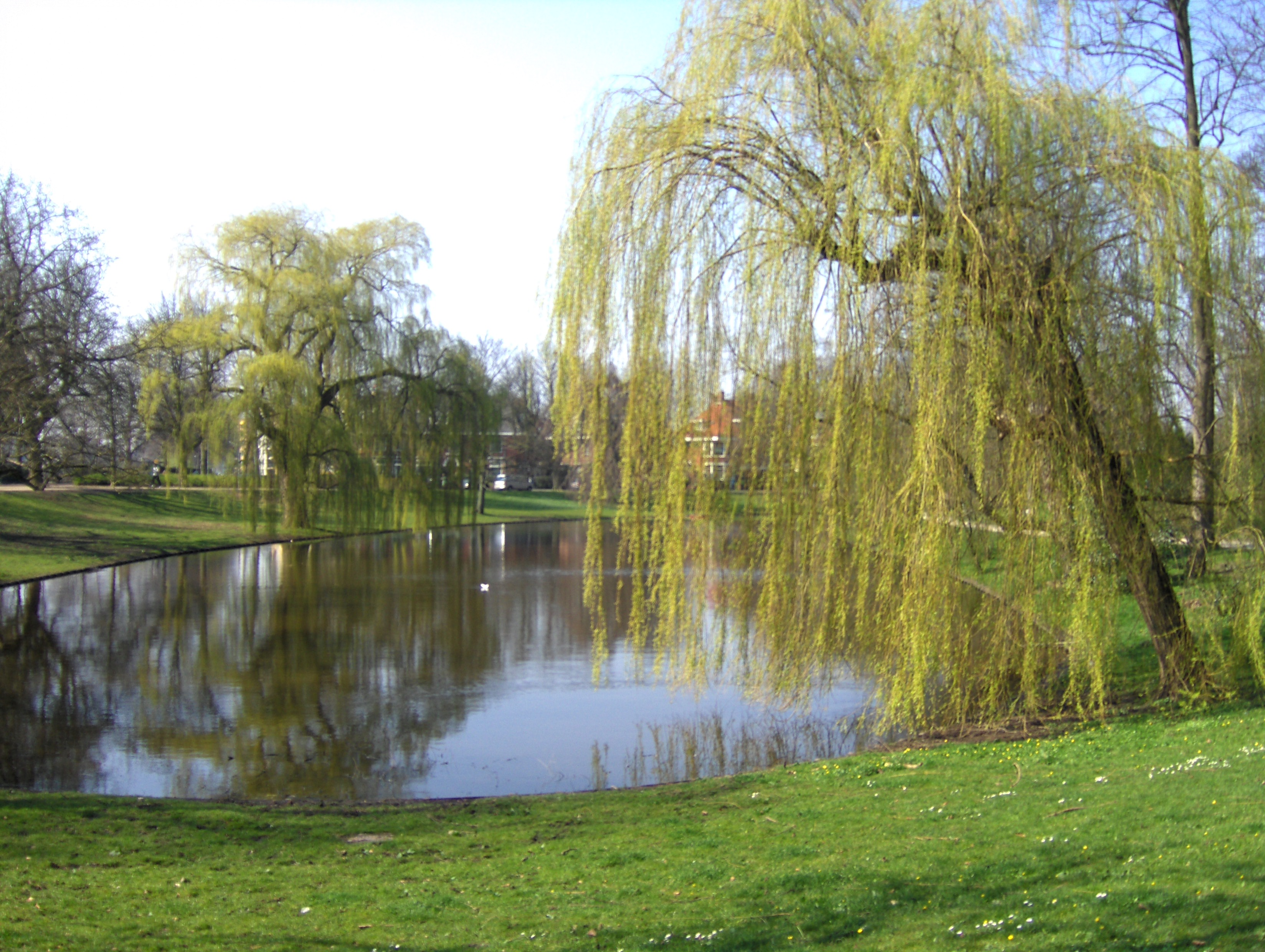
The big pond of the Noorderplantsoen

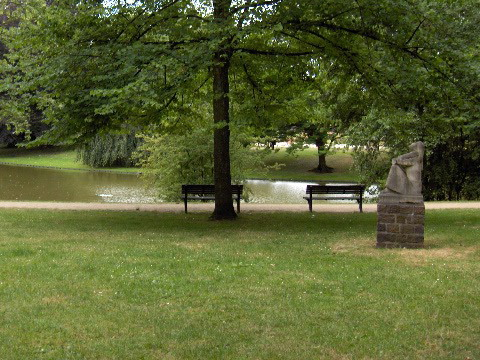
Noorderplantsoen near the big pond

Noorderplantsoen is an urban public park in the city of Groningen in the Netherlands, situated slightly north of the city center. Its name is Dutch for northern public garden.

== History ==
In 1874 the Vestingswet was passed. This law allowed cities to expand outside of the city walls and fortifications. Since the fortifications were no longer in use, they were transformed into a public park. The earth ramparts were incorporated in the park architecture and the moats were turned into ponds. The architecture is of an English garden style, characterized by meandering paths and serpentine ponds, inspired by wild nature. The shape of the park still reflects the former purpose of the area: the long but narrow park curves around the old city. The park includes an Art Nouveau bandstand and a small restaurant.

Until the mid-90s the Noorderplantsoen was split up by a busy road, but a referendum in 1994 decided - with a narrow majority - to close this road for motorized traffic.

== Events ==
Every year a number of events take place in the Noorderplantsoen, of which the Noorderzon Theater Festival is well known. This cultural event takes place at the end of August and is visited by over 125,000 visitors. Many theater, dance and music groups from The Netherlands and abroad perform during this 11-day festival.

Another well-known event in the Noorderplantsoen is the plantsoenloop. This run through the park is held annually in October or early November and attracts about 500 runners. In 2007 the 50th edition of the plantsoenloop took place.
