= Capital Theatre (Bendigo) =

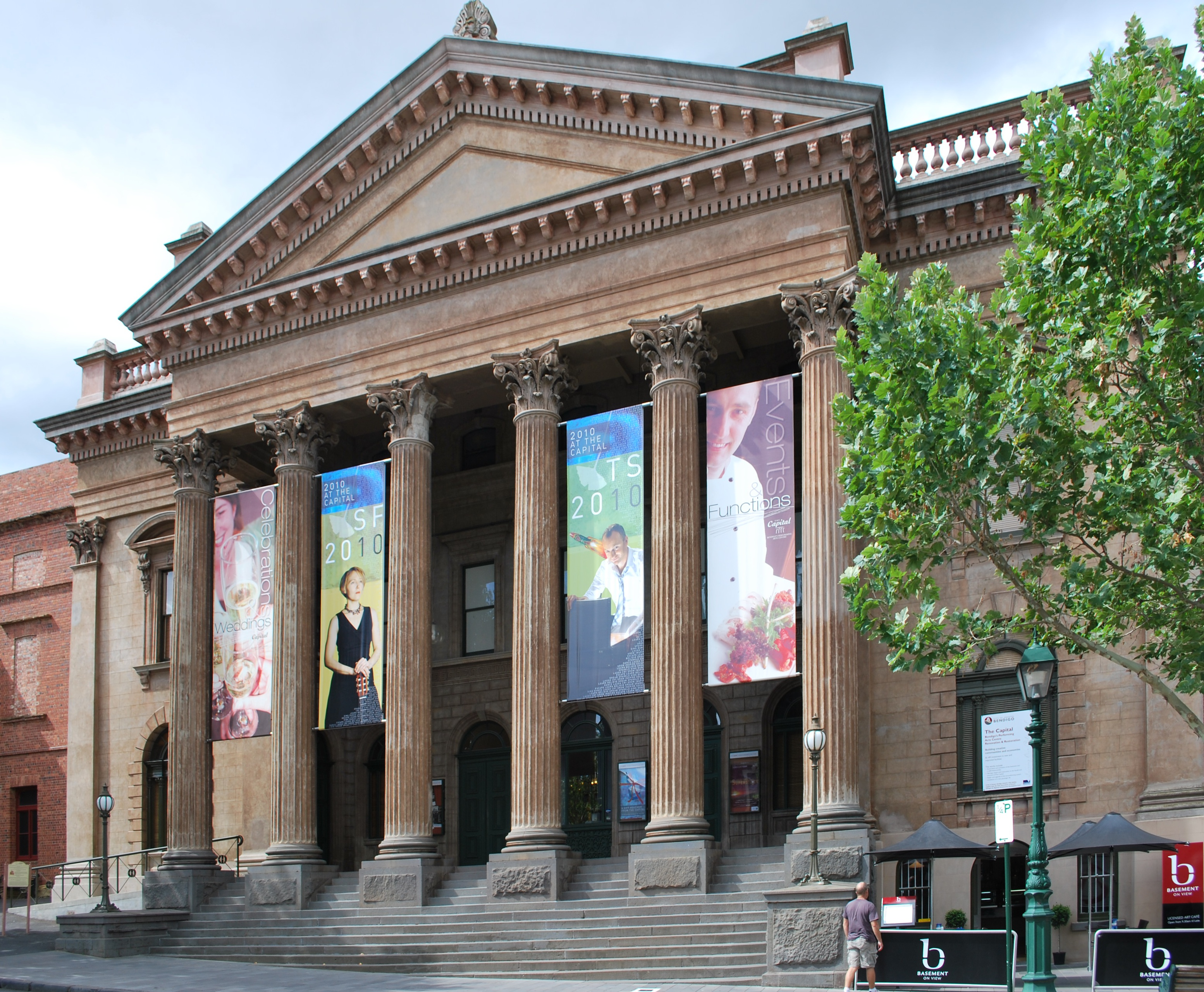
- Interactive map of Capital Theatre
- Address: 50 View Street; Bendigo, Victoria; Australia
- Coordinates: 36.7573°S 144.2763°E
- Capacity: 480
- Designation: Victorian Heritage Register

Construction
- Opened: 1873
- Architects: William Vahland and Robert Getzschmann

The Capital Theatre is a 480-seat theatre in Bendigo, Victoria, Australia.

Designed by prolific Bendigo architects William Vahland and Robert Getzschmann, the building opened in 1873 as a Masonic lodge, and was divided into a private and public section, the latter containing a ballroom where an array of entertainment was provided, including opera, plays, lectures, recitals and, later, silent movie screenings. In 1890, the Masons refurbished the building to include a dedicated theatre room. Originally called the Mason Theatre, it was renamed the New Britannia in 1912 and then the Capital Theatre in the 1930s. Today the whole building is occupied by the Capital, and has state and national heritage listing.

== See also ==
- List of Masonic buildings
