= Robin Stewart =

British actor (1946–2015)

- Born: 9 October 1946; Calcutta, India
- Died: 22 November 2015 (aged 69); Windsor, Berkshire, United Kingdom
- Occupations: Actor, game show host, reporter
- Years active: 1957–2003
- Spouse(s): Gillian Whitworth 1969–? (divorced); Fiona Partridge 1975–? (divorced) Roberta Daler (m. 2012)
- Children: 1

Robin Stewart (9 October 1946 – 22 November 2015) was an English actor, game show host and reporter. He was best known for playing Mike Abbott, the son of Sid James' character Sid Abbott in the 1970s sitcom Bless This House.

== Early life ==
Stewart was born Robin Guy Henry Steuer in Calcutta, British India to a Jewish father, Maximilian Steuer (1902–1978) and British mother, Dorothy Evelyn Beer (1906–1966).

== Career ==
Stewart acted on television and in feature films in both the UK and Australia. Some of his British film roles include Tamahine, The Haunted House of Horror, Cromwell, Adventures of a Private Eye, and The Legend of the 7 Golden Vampires as Leyland Van Helsing.

He played the role of Mike Abbott in sit-com series Bless This House during its entire 1971–76 run; due to prior commitments he did not feature in the film version of the series. After being asked to go to New Zealand for a telethon and subsequently taken back to host his own show, Stewart ended up being asked to relocate where he became involved with such soaps as The Young Doctors as a villainous character trying to silence a blind patient who had overheard his criminal acts, and Sons and Daughters as the villainous doctor Ross Newman.

Other roles in Australia included a lead role in sex comedy feature film Pacific Banana (1981), and an appearance in prison based soap opera Punishment. He was also one of the main characters in The Timeless Land, playing the role of John MacArthur. He played one of the supporting roles in the rock series Sweet and Sour for ABC; co-hosted Good Morning Sydney with Maureen Duval. Briefly he was the advertising executive for Rolling Stone magazine. He briefly co-produced weekly magazine program Midweek Live for DDQ TV in Toowoomba with presenter Craig Berkman in early 1990. For 18 months Stewart was the senior producer for FNQTV in Cairns.

== Personal life ==
After two brief earlier marriages (the second to magazine fashion editor, Fiona Partridge), he married Roberta "Bertie" Daler in 2012 and they had one daughter. Stewart suffered a stroke in 2003 and, having been a 60 cigarettes a day smoker, also developed emphysema.

His death on 22 November 2015 was announced on his official website. He was 69 years old.

== Filmography ==
=== Film ===
Year	Title	Role	Notes
1961	Greyfriars Bobby	Jodie Ross	Uncredited
1962	H.M.S. Defiant	Pardoe	
1962	Masters of Venus	Jim	
1963	Tamahine	Fiend	
1965	Be My Guest	Mathews	
1969	The Haunted House of Horror	Henry	
1970	Cromwell	Charles, Prince of Wales	
1974	The Legend of the 7 Golden Vampires	Leyland Van Helsing	
1976	Sextet	Bernie	
1977	Adventures of a Private Eye	Scott	
1981	Pacific Banana	Paul	
1983	Get Crazy	Nada Band	
1995	The Blue Villa	Client	

=== Television ===
Year	Title	Role	Notes
1960	Deadline Midnight	Peter Czinski	Episode #1.12
1961	Vice Versa	Tipping	Television film
1968	Dixon of Dock Green	Shoe-Shop Assistant	Episode: "A Quiet Sunday"
1968	The Very Merry Widow	Waiter	Episode: "Judgement in Paris"
1969	Softly, Softly	Indiopellus	Episode: "Persistence"
1969	Rembrandt	Titus	Television film
1971–1976	Bless This House	Mike Abbott	65 episodes
1972	The Troubleshooters	Spence	Episode: "Whatever Became of the Year 2000?"
1975	Whodunnit?	Harry Cook	Episode: "Pop Goes the Weasel"
1977	Leap in the Dark	Ernst	Episode: "The Fetch"
1980	The Timeless Land	John Macarthur	8 episodes
1981	The Young Doctors	Malcolm Fielding	Episode #1.1019
1982	Oliver Twist	Voice	Television film
1983	A Christmas Carol	Voice	Television film
1983	Sherlock Holmes and the Sign of Four	Voice	Television film
1983	Sherlock Holmes and the Valley of Fear	Voice	Television film
1983	Sherlock Holmes and the Baskerville Curse	Jack Stapleton	Television film
1983	Great Expectations	Voice	Television film
1983	David Copperfield	Voice	Television film
1984	Five Mile Creek	Scale	Episode: "Tricks of the Trade"
1984	A Tale of Two Cities	Voice	Television film
1984	Sweet and Sour	Brian Kawolski	4 episodes
1984–1985	Sons and Daughters	Ross Newman	29 episodes
1985	Runaway Island	Gonzalez	2 episodes
1985	Nicholas Nickleby	Voice	Television film
2003	Welcher & Welcher	Alf	8 episodes
