= Luan Peters =

British actress (1946–2017)

- Born: Carol Ann Hirsch; 11 June 1946; Bethnal Green, London, England
- Died: 24 December 2017 (aged 71)
- Other name: Karol Keyes
- Occupations: Actress, singer
- Years active: 1950–1990, 2005

Luan Peters (11 June 1946 – 24 December 2017), also known as Karol Keyes, was an English actress and singer.

== Biography ==
Born Carol Ann Hirsch, she made her stage debut in a pantomime aged four, then went on to win a drama scholarship at the age of 16 after a performance of Twelfth Night.

She started singing in a band for £2 a night as a way of earning extra money while attending drama school. In Manchester, under the name Karol Keyes (named after her management, Keystone Promotions), she fronted Karol Keyes and the Big Sound, a band previously known as The Fat Sound. One of her first records was an Ike & Tina Turner song called "A Fool in Love", released on Columbia. She left that band in June 1966; subsequently, as Luan Peters (a name she adopted in the late 1960s), she succeeded Tina Charles as frontwoman of 5000 Volts. A year later, she joined Joan Littlewood’s drama school at the Theatre Royal Stratford East. In 1971, she starred in Not Tonight, Darling a drama directed by Anthony Sloman.

Peters is known for her appearances in Hammer horror films of the 1970s such as Lust for a Vampire (1971) and Twins of Evil (1971). Other film credits include Man of Violence (1969), Freelance (1971), Not Tonight, Darling (1971), The Flesh and Blood Show (1972), Vampira (1974), Land of the Minotaur (1976), The Wildcats of St Trinian's (1980) and Pacific Banana (1981).

Her stage work includes A Man Most Likely To (1969, with George Cole), Pyjama Tops (1969), Decameron 73 (1973), John, Paul, George, Ringo ... and Bert (1974, playing Linda McCartney), Tom Stoppard's Dirty Linen (1976), Shut Your Eyes And Think Of England! (1978) and Funny Peculiar (1985).

In 1972, she starred in the unbroadcast television series Go Girl, as a go-go dancer caught up in thriller situations. The pilot episode, possibly the only one made, was released twice on UK video in the early 1980s, first as Give Me a Ring Sometime (the pilot episode title) and later as Passport to Murder. Other series were: Z-Cars, Dear Mother...Love Albert, Public Eye, Coronation Street (playing series regular Lorna Shawcross in 1971), Doctor Who (in the serials The Macra Terror in 1967, and Frontier in Space in 1973), Target, The Professionals, and the Fawlty Towers episode "The Psychiatrist" in which she played Raylene Miles, an Australian tourist. Her last known television role was in an episode of The Bill in 1990. In 2005, she was interviewed for the documentary Fawlty Towers Revisited.

=== Death ===
Luan Peters died on Christmas Eve 2017, aged 71, but her death was not made public until June 2018.

== Filmography ==
=== Film ===
Year	Title	Role	Notes
1970	Doctor in Trouble	Doctor Dare fan	Uncredited
1970	Man of Violence	Angel	
1971	Freelance	Rosemary	
1971	Lust for a Vampire	Trudi	
1971	Twins of Evil	Gerta	
1971	Not Tonight, Darling	Karen	
1972	The Flesh and Blood Show	Carol Edwards	
1974	Vampira	Pottinger's secretary	
1976	Land of the Minotaur	Laurie Gordon	
1980	The Wildcats of St Trinian's	Poppy Adams	
1981	Pacific Banana	Candy Bubbles	

=== Television ===
Year	Title	Role	Notes
1967	Doctor Who	Chicki	Episode: "The Macra Terror"
1967	Mickey Dunne	Young Woman	Episode: "No Flowers by Request"
1967	Z-Cars	Susan Cook	2 episodes
1967	Dixon of Dock Green	Marie	Episode: "The Party"
1967	Crossroads	Kim Hudson	9 episodes
1968	Public Eye	Brenda Smedley	Episode: "Strictly Private and Confidential"
1968	Crime Buster	Unknown	Episode: "Howzat"
1968	Nana	Maria Blond	2 episodes
1968	The Caesars	Agrippinilla	Episode: "Caligula"
1969	Randall and Hopkirk (Deceased)	Dancer	Episode: "That's How Murder Snowballs"
1969	Strange Report	Ward Nurse	Episode: "REPORT 3424: EPIDEMIC - A Most Curious Crime"
1970	Z-Cars	Doreen	Episode: "By Bread Alone: Part 2"
1971	Dear Mother...Love Albert	Leslie Willis	3 episodes
1971	Coronation Street	Lorna Shawcross	6 episodes
1971	Public Eye	Lana L'Ettrell	Episode: "Transatlantic Cousins"
1971	On the Buses	Joan	Episode: "Canteen Trouble"
1972	The Pathfinders	ACW Gwen Porter	Episode: "Into the Fire"
1972	Go Girl	Carol	TV pilot
1973	Doctor Who	Sheila	Episode: "Frontier in Space"
1973	Crown Court	Dorothy Greenway	3 episodes
1977	Robin's Nest	Elizabeth	Episode: "A Little Competition"
1977	The Boys and Mrs B	Ingrid	TV film
1977	Whodunnit?	Jillian	Episode: "The Rajah's Ruby"
1977	Target	Denise Musgrave	Episode: "Roadrunner"
1978	The Professionals	Lady in sports car	Episode: "Heroes"
1978	Mixed Blessings	Deirdre	Episode: "A Leg from the Past"
1979	Fawlty Towers	Raylene Miles	Episode: "The Psychiatrist"
1979–1980	The Cannon and Ball Show	Various	5 episodes
1980	The Enigma Files	Elvira	Episode: "Investigation of a Copper"
1989	The Bill	Doris	Episode: "The Visit"
1990	The Bill	Sylvia	Episode: "Vendetta"

== Discography ==
=== Singles ===
- "The Good Love The Bad Love" "Gonna Find me a Substitute" (Karol Keyes & the Big Sound, Unreleased Abbey Rd. EMI audition Recording)
- "No One Can Take Your Place"/"You Beat Me to the Punch" (Fontana TF517 December 1964) (as Karol Keyes)
- "One in a Million" (1964) (as Karol Keyes)
- "A Fool in Love/The Good Love and the Bad Love" (1966) (as Karol Keyes)
- "Don't Jump" (1966) (as Karol Keyes)
- "Can't You Hear the Music"/"The Sweetest Touch" (Fontana TF 846 July 1967) (as Karol Keyes)
- "Crazy Annie/ Colours" (1970)
- "Everything I Want to Do/Billy Come Down" (1973, Polydor)
- "Love Countdown/Beach Love" (1977, CBS, Germany)
- "Dolphin Dive" (1979)
- "It's Me Again Margaret/Henhouse Holiday" (1980, Precision)
- "Trouble" (1981, from the film Pacific Banana)
