= Against the Grain: More Meat Than Wheat =

- Directed by: Tim Burns
- Written by: Tim Burns
- Release date: 1981
- Country: Australia
- Language: English

Against the Grain is a 1981 Australian film directed by Tim Burns.

The film had censorship issues.
