= Levkas Man =

1971 novel by Hammond Innes

- First edition
- Author: Hammond Innes
- Genre: Thriller
- Publisher: Collins (UK); Knopf (US)
- Publication date: 1971
- Pages: 322

Levkas Man is a thriller novel by British author Hammond Innes, published in 1971. It tells the story of a doctor who goes to the Greek island of Lefkada (Levkas) with his adopted son in order to prove a theory about prehistoric man.

== Plot ==
The story takes place during the early 1970s, with the Cold War at its peak and the Middle East smouldering with political conflict. It is told by the protagonist, Paul van der Voort. He is a 28-year-old sailor from the Netherlands and is just back from a long journey, when he gets involved in a fight at the port area of Amsterdam. He needs to flee after murdering a man and goes back to his childhood home in the city of Amsterdam. His childhood has not been a happy one and the relationship between him and his adoptive father was full of strain, arguments, abuse and conflict. His father (who, unbeknownst to him at first, happens to be his real father) is a famous archaeologist, Dr Pieter van der Voort. Dr Van der Voort is trying to prove his theory that the pre-historic origins of modern European man lie in Greece.

Paul finds the house empty, except for his father's housekeeper and secretary, Sonia; he is visited by two of his father's fellow archaeologists. He learns that his father recently has gone on an expedition to Greece but has since disappeared.

A few days later Paul gets himself involved with an international smuggler, who wants to send him to Malta in order to pick up illicit antique artifacts from Turkey. Paul decides to take the assignment, as it is an opportunity to avoid arrest and to go searching for his father. The smugglers provide him with a charter boat with a crew that consists of a husband and wife. After he has picked up the merchandise, he is confronted by police. They think his father is a communist spy. The suspicion is fueled by their belief that his father's previous expeditions were funded by the Soviet Union. While sailing the Aegean Sea, Paul discovers that a rival archaeologist is out to take all the credit for his father's discoveries in Greece. He also learns more of the circumstances surrounding his father's disappearance: at a dig site Dr Van der Voort got angry and assaulted one of his assistants, then vanished.

Following his father's footsteps with help from Sonia, Paul briefly meets his father; but the police are after him, so Paul is forced to lead them astray so his father can escape them. The Greek police, the archaeologists, and others go to one of the caves on the island of Levkas. It is here that Dr Van der Voort was at work during his previous expedition to Greece. It appears Dr Van der Voort has been obsessively digging there again, in order to prove his theory; and that he has been exhausting himself. However, the doctor is nowhere to be seen; he is found to be trapped behind a rockfall, caused by an earth tremor.

In the climatic scene, the archaeologists start removing the fallen rocks and Paul makes an undersea dive and reaches a way into the cavern where his father is trapped. When father and son meet for one last time, they sit down to talk in the cavern, which is covered in stunning prehistoric paintings which give credence to Dr Van der Voort's theory: modern man migrated into Europe from Africa, not Asia. It also indicates that prehistoric man was violent and that homo sapiens exterminated the older race of Neanderthals.

Dr Van der Voort confirms again to his son his personal view that modern-day man is destroying the planet and that they are killing off each other at a terrible rate. When Paul is confronted by his father confessing to murdering his rival, who had the audacity to enter the cavern, he is shocked. Dr Van der Voort, having proven himself right, asks Paul to leave him in the cave to die, which Paul does. He returns to the yacht.

In the end Paul burns his bridges and leaves for a new beginning under the chaos of imminent war in Greece. He leaves Sonia and his other friends with the Greek police. There is a Greek police officer who has been following him around while on suspicion of smuggling. The police officer has boarded the charter yacht in order to escort Paul back to port. Paul restrains the Greek officer and steals the charter yacht. He takes off to sea with the smuggled goods, heading south in the hope of finding freedom.

== Television adaptation ==
Levkas Man was adapted into a six-episode television miniseries by the Australian Broadcasting Corporation (ABC), which aired from 18 March until 22 April 1981. It was a joint Australian–British–West German production, and was shot on location in Greece.
