= List of Australian films of 1984 =

== 1984 ==
Title	Director	Cast	Genre	Notes
After Hours	Jane Campion	Anna Maria Monticelli, Russell Newman, Danielle Pearse, Don Reid	Short / Drama	IMDb
Ana Who	Pip Karmel		Documentary	IMDb
Annie's Coming Out	Gil Brealey	Angela Punch McGregor, Drew Forsythe, Liddy Clark, Monica Maughan, Philippa Baker, Mark Butler, John Frawley, Wallas Eaton, Lyn Collingwood, Esme Melville, Charles 'Bud' Tingwell	Drama	IMDb
At Last... Bullamakanka: The Motion Picture	Simon Heath	Steve Rackman, Gary Kliger, Mark Hembrow, Alyson Best, Iain Gardiner, Debbie Matts, Kristoffer Greaves, David Bracks, Robert Baxter, Basia Bonkowski, Angry Anderson, Glenn Shorrock, John Farnham, Molly Meldrum, Gordon Elliott	Comedy / Musical Feature film	IMDb aka "Bullamakanka"
The Boy Who Had Everything	Stephen Wallace	Jason Connery, Diane Cilento, Laura Williams, Lewis Fitz-Gerald, Nique Needles, Michael Gow, Mark Wignall, Monroe Reimers, Tim Burns, Caz Lederman, Jo Kennedy, Ian Gilmour	Drama Feature film	IMDb, Entered into the 14th Moscow International Film Festival aka "Winner Takes All"
The Camel Boy	Yoram Gross	Barbara Frawley, Ron Haddrick, John Meillon	Animation / Adventure	IMDb
Channel Chaos	Barry Peak	Jay Hackett, Tim Scally, Lyn Semmler, Clive Hearne, Peter Hosking, Peter Thompson, Brenda Clarke, David Beresh, Alan Pentland, Peter Moon, Stefan Dennis, Gavin Wood	Comedy Feature film	IMDb
The Cleaning	Robert Grant	Neill Gladwin, Stephen Kearney	Comedy Short film	IMDb
The Coolangatta Gold	Igor Auzins	Joss McWilliam, Nick Tate, Colin Friels, Josephine Smulders, Robyn Nevin, Grant Kenny, Melissa Jaffer	Drama / Sport Feature film	IMDb aka "The Gold and the Glory"
Conference-ville	Julian Pringle	John Gaden, Robyn Nevin, Kevin Miles, Ray Barrett, Robin Ramsay, Mervyn Drake, John Frawley, Mercia Deane-Johns	Drama ABC TV film	
Crime of the Decade	Ken Cameron	John Gregg, Mark Davis, Toni Allaylis, Rod Zuanic, Paul Smith, Belinda Giblin, John Hamblin, Vicki Luke, Bill Pearson, Judy Nunn, John Jarratt	Drama ABC TV film	
Displaced Persons	Geoffrey Nottage	John Wood, Dasha Blahova, Steven Vidler, Annie Byron, Urszula Golka, Anna Golka, Slawomir Wabik, Joe Spano, Eva Sitta, Reg Gillam, John Orcsik	Drama ABC TV film	
Dot and the Bunny	Yoram Gross	Drew Forsythe, Barbara Frawley, Ron Haddrick	Animation / Family	IMDb
The Drover's Wife	Sue Brooks	Jeff Arnold, Jeff Ashby, Elaine Gay	Short	IMDb
Every Day... Every Night	Kathy Mueller	Carolyn Howard, David Swann	Short	IMDb
Every Move She Makes	Catherine Millar	Julie Nihill, Doug Bowles, Pepe Trevor, James Laurie, Bruce Miles, Victor Kazan, Bruce Knappett, Rod Williams, Shane Connor, George Harlem	Drama / Thriller ABC TV film	
Fantasy Man	John Meagher	Harold Hopkins, Jeanie Drynan, Kate Fitzpatrick, Kerry Mack, Colin Croft, John Howitt	Drama Feature film	IMDb
Fast Talking	Ken Cameron	Steve Bisley, Tracy Mann, Peter Hehir, Rod Zuanic, Toni Allaylis, Chris Truswell, Alistair Duncan, Frank Lloyd, Gail Sweeny, Dave Godden, Julie McGregor, Max Cullen, Peter Collingwood	Drama Feature film	IMDb
The Fire in the Stone	Gary Conway	Alan Cassell, Paul Smith, Ray Meagher,	Drama / Family Feature film	IMDb
Future Schlock	Chris Kiely, Barry Peak	Mary-Anne Fahey, Mike Bishop, Tracey Callander, Simon Thorpe, Peter Cox, Tiriel Mora	Comedy / Fantasy / Sci-Fi Feature film	IMDb
Getting Wet	P.J. Hogan	Jeremy Shadlow, Claire Crowther	Short	IMDb
A Girl's Own Story	Jane Campion	Gabrielle Shornegg, Geraldine Haywood, Marina Knight	Short / Drama	IMDb, 27 min. Screened at the 1986 Cannes Film Festival
The Girl From Moonooloo		Jacki Weaver, David Atkins, Henri Szeps, Ivan Waters	Comedy / Musical ABC TV film	
The Great Gold Swindle	John Power	John Hargreaves, Steve Jodrell, Tony Rickards, Robert Hughes, Chris Haywood, Bryan Marshall, Barrie Barla, Barbara Llewellyn	Crime / Drama TV film	IMDb
High Country	Bill Hughes	John Waters, Tom Oliver, Terry Serio, Tim Hughes, Simone Buchanan, Rod Williams, Robin Bowering, Maureen Edwards, Bret Climo, Peter Aanensen, Edward Hepple, Kerry Mack	Drama TV film	IMDb
Holzwege: Wood Roads/Wrong Ways	Georgia Wallace-Crabbe		Short	IMDb
Innocent Prey	Colin Eggleston	P.J. Soles, Kit Taylor, Grigor Taylor, Martin Balsam, John Warnock, Richard Morgan, Susan Stenmark	Horror / Thriller Feature film	IMDb
Kindred Spirits	Peter Fisk	Julieanne Newbould, John Ewart, Patricia Kennedy, Nicholas Eadie, David Waters, Kevin Wilson, Russell Newman, Benita Collings, Allan Penney, Patrick Ward, Caz Lederman	Drama / Thriller ABC TV film	
Leonora	Derek Strahan	Mandi Miller, Leon Marvell, Amanda Louise, David Evans, Ron Beck, James G. Steele, Lala Young, Corinne Collins, Stephen Lee, Zvonimir Mesarov, Angela Menzies-Wills	Drama / Erotica Feature film	IMDb
Mail Order Bride	Stephen Wallace	Ray Meagher, Charito Ortez, Paul Sonkkila, Sheila Kennelly, Robert Noble, Bill Conn, Frank McNamara, Justine Saunders	Drama ABC TV film	
Matthew and Son	Gary Conway	Paul Cronin, Paula Duncan, Darius Perkins, Peter Kowitz, Regina Gaigalas, Edward Hepple, Greg Fleet, Caroline Gillmer, Victor Kazan, Nicole Kidman	Drama TV film / TV Pilot	
Melvin, Son of Alvin	John Eastway	Graeme Blundell, Gerry Sont, Lenita Psillakis, Jon Finlayson, Tina Bursill, David Argue, Abigail, Arianthe Galani, Colin McEwan, Greg Stroud, Steve Bastoni, Katy Manning, Rhonda Burchmore	Comedy Feature film	IMDb
My First Wife	Paul Cox	John Hargreaves, Wendy Hughes, Lucy Angwin, David Cameron, Anna Jemison, Betty Lucas, Lucy Uralov, Charles Tingwell, Tony Llewellyn-Jones, Julia Blake, Renee Geyer	Drama / Romance Feature film	IMDb
The Naked Country	Tim Burstall	John Stanton, Rebecca Gilling, Ivar Kants, Tom E. Lewis, John Jarratt, Neela Day, Simon Chilvers	Action / Drama / Thriller Feature film	IMDb
The Old Curiosity Shop	Warwick Gilbert	John Benton, Jason Blackwell, Wallas Eaton	Animation / Adventure	IMDb
On Guard	Susan Lambert	Liddy Clark, Jan Cornall, Kerry Dwyer, Mystery Carnage	Crime / Drama	IMDb
On the Loose	Jane Oehr	Steve Bergan, Maria DaCosta, Jim Filipovski	Drama	IMDb
One Night Stand	John Duigan	Tyler Coppin, Saskia Post, Cassandra Delaney, Jay Hackett, David Pledger, Ian Gilmour, Midnight Oil	Comedy / Drama Feature film	IMDb
The Phantom Treehouse	Paul Williams	Brian Hannan, Beate Harrison, Jason Sole	Animation / Adventure	IMDb
Queen of the Road	Bruce Best	Joanne Samuel, Amanda Muggleton, Shane Withington, Chris Haywood, Chris Hession, Alan McQueen, Kevin Leslie, Shirley Cameron, Allan Penney, Christopher Pate	Comedy / Drama TV film	
Razorback	Russell Mulcahy	Gregory Harrison, Arkie Whiteley, Bill Kerr, Judy Morris, Chris Haywood, David Argue, John Howard, John Ewart,	Horror / Thriller Feature film	IMDb
Red Matildas	Sharon Connolly, Trevor Graham		Documentary	IMDb
Run, Chrissie, Run!	Chris Langman	Carmen Duncan, Michael Aitkens, Shane Briant, Nicholas Eadie, Red Symons, Annie Jones, Simone Buchanan	Crime / Drama / Thriller Feature film	IMDb
The Settlement	Howard Rubie	Bill Kerr, John Jarratt, Lorna Lesley, Tony Barry, Katy Wild, Elaine Cusick, David Downer, Dennis Grosvenor, Babette Stephens, Alan Cassell	Drama Feature film	IMDb
Silver City	Sophia Turkiewicz	Gosia Dobrowolska, Ivar Kants, Steve Bisley, Anna Jemison, Debra Lawrance, Ewa Brok, Annie Byron, Tim McKenzie, Ron Graham, John Clayton, Ian Gilmour, Karen Petersen, Dennis Miller	Drama Feature film	IMDb
Skin Deep	Mark Joffe / Chris Langham	Briony Behets, James Smilie, Carmen Duncan, Kate Fitzpatrick, Antoinette Byron, Maureen O'Shaughnessy, Liz Harris, Bartholomew John, John O'May, David Reyne, Jon Finlayson, Nicole Kidman, Bobby Limb	Drama TV film	
The Slim Dusty Movie	Rob Stewart	Slim Dusty, Joy McKean, Anne Kirkpatrick, Stan Coster, Jon Blake, Gordon Parsons, Sandy Paul, Beverley Phillips, Buck Taylor, Buddy Weston	Documentary / Biography / Musical Feature film	IMDb
Stanley: Every Home Should Have One	Esben Storm	Peter Bensley, Graham Kennedy, Nell Campbell, Michael Craig, Sue Walker, Joy Smithers, David Argue, Max Cullen, Lorna Lesley, Leonard Teale, Harold Hopkins, Willie Fennell, Jon Ewing	Comedy / Romance Feature film	IMDb
Street Hero	Michael Pattinson	Vince Colosimo, Sigrid Thornton, Sandy Gore, Bill Hunter, Ray Marshall, Tiriel Mora, Amanda Muggleton, Peta Toppano	Drama / Musical Feature film	IMDb
Strikebound	Richard Lowenstein	Chris Haywood, Carol Burns, Hugh Keays-Byrne, David Kendall, Marion Edward, Anthony Hawkins, Nik Forster, Tiriel Mora, John Flaus, Rob Steele	Drama Feature film	IMDb
Tale of a Tiger	Rolf de Heer	Grant Navin, Gordon Poole, Caz Lederman, Peter Feeley, Dylan Lyle, Basil Clarke, Walter Sullivan, Gayle Kennedy	Adventure / Drama / Family Feature film	IMDb
Where the Green Ants Dream	Werner Herzog	Bruce Spence, Wandjuk Marika, Ray Barrett, Wandjuk Marika, Roy Marika, Colleen Clifford, Ralph Cotterill, Tony Llewellyn-Jones, Hugh Keays-Byrne, Norman Kaye	Drama / Sci-fi Feature film	IMDb aka "Wo die grünen Ameisen träumen"
White Man's Legend	Geoffrey Nottage	Bill Kerr, Dorothy St Heaps, Deryck Barnes, Maureen Watson, Don Reid, Bob Maza, Reg Gillam, Frank Taylor, Patti Crocker, Fiona Press, Michael Watson	Drama ABC TV film	

== See also ==
- 1984 in Australia
- 1984 in Australian television
