= 1984 in Australia =

- Monarch: Elizabeth II
- Governor-General: Sir Ninian Stephen
- Prime minister: Bob Hawke
- Population: 15,393,472
- Australian of the Year: Lowitja O'Donoghue
- Elections: NSW, Federal, Referendum

The following lists events that happened during 1984 in Australia.

- Decades: 1960s; 1970s; 1980s; 1990s; 2000s
- See also: 1984 in Australian television; 1984 in Australian literature; Other events of 1984; Federal election; Timeline of Australian history

== Incumbents ==
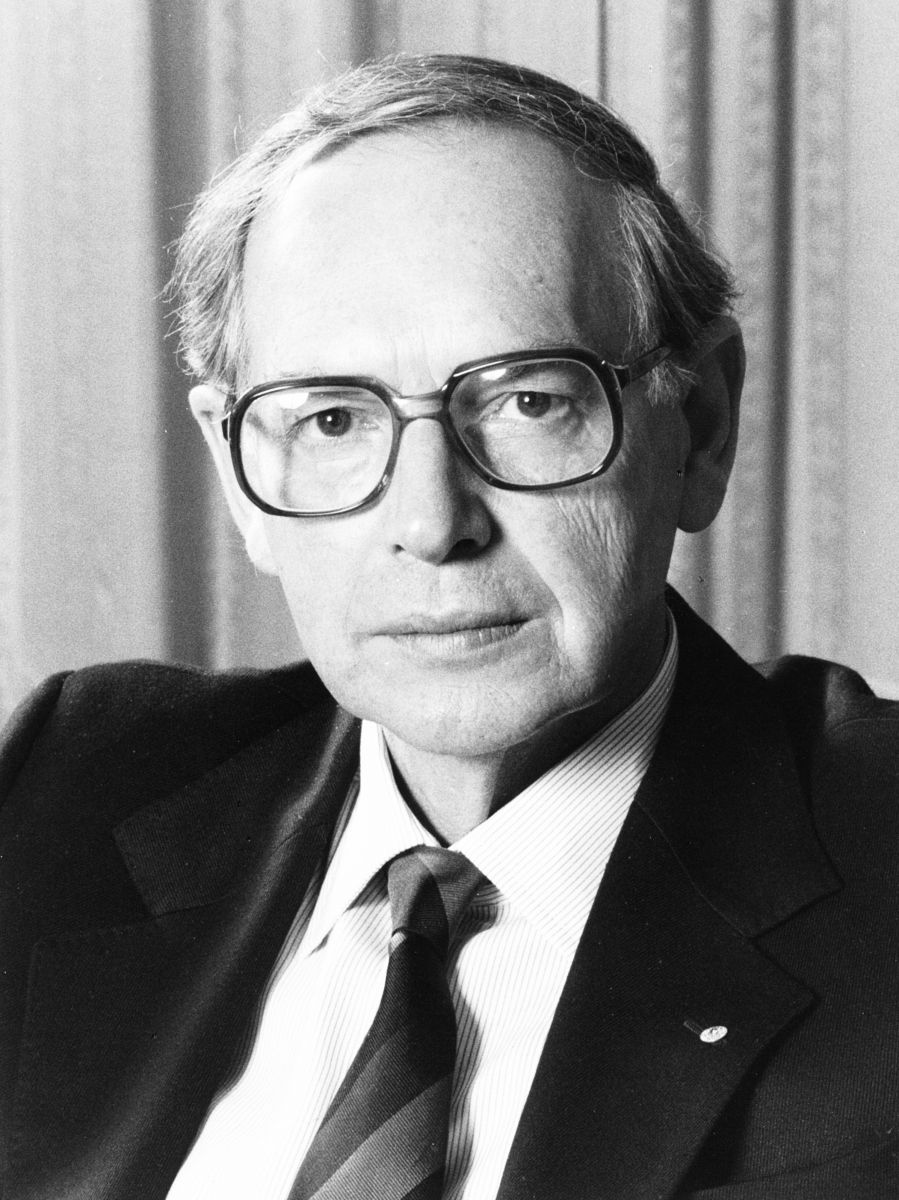
Sir Ninian Stephen

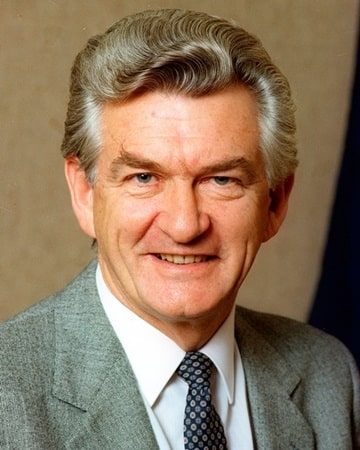
Bob Hawke

- Monarch – Elizabeth II
- Governor-General – Sir Ninian Stephen
- Prime Minister – Bob Hawke
  - Deputy Prime Minister – Lionel Bowen
  - Opposition Leader – Andrew Peacock
- Chief Justice – Sir Harry Gibbs

=== State and territory leaders ===
- Premier of New South Wales – Neville Wran
  - Opposition Leader – Nick Greiner
- Premier of Queensland – (Sir) Joh Bjelke-Petersen
  - Opposition Leader – Keith Wright (until 29 August), then Nev Warburton
- Premier of South Australia – John Bannon
  - Opposition Leader – John Olsen
- Premier of Tasmania – Robin Gray
  - Opposition Leader – Ken Wriedt
- Premier of Victoria – John Cain Jr.
  - Opposition Leader – Jeff Kennett
- Premier of Western Australia – Brian Burke
  - Opposition Leader – Ray O'Connor (until 15 February), then Bill Hassell
- Chief Minister of the Northern Territory – Paul Everingham (until 15 October), then Ian Tuxworth
  - Opposition Leader – Bob Collins
- Chief Minister of Norfolk Island – David Buffett

=== Governors and administrators ===
- Governor of New South Wales – Sir James Rowland
- Governor of Queensland – Sir James Ramsay
- Governor of South Australia – Sir Donald Dunstan
- Governor of Tasmania – Sir James Plimsoll
- Governor of Victoria – Sir Brian Murray
- Governor of Western Australia – Gordon Reid (from 2 July)
- Administrator of Norfolk Island – Raymond Trebilco
- Administrator of the Northern Territory – Eric Johnston

== Events ==
=== January ===
- 17 January – Ian Sinclair is elected leader of the National Party of Australia following Doug Anthony's retirement.
- 26 January – Aboriginal leader Lowitja (Lois) O'Donoghue becomes Australian of the Year.
- 27 to 30 January – The final Narara Music Festival on the Central Coast of New South Wales features INXS, Simple Minds, The Pretenders, Talking Heads, Eurythmics and Def Leppard.

=== February ===
- 1 February – Medicare comes into effect in Australia.
- 2 February – Melbourne newspaper The Age publishes phone taps incriminating an unknown judge.
- 14 February – Elton John marries Renate Blauel in Sydney.

=== March ===
- 6 March –
  - A bomb blast wrecks the home of Judge Richard Gee in the Sydney suburb of Belrose.
  - High Court Judge, Justice Lionel Murphy is named in Parliament as the judge referred to in The Age tapes published on 2 February.
- 24 March – Wran Government re-elected in NSW for a 4th term.
- 26 March – The $100 note is introduced.

=== April ===
- April – A 915g jar of Vegemite is the first product in Australia to be electronically scanned at a checkout.
- 19 April – Advance Australia Fair is proclaimed as Australia's national anthem, and green and gold as the national colours.

=== May ===
- 14 May – The $1 coin is introduced in Australia.
- 18 May – In New South Wales gay sex between consenting adult males is decriminalised.

=== July ===
- 4 July – Pearl, wife of Justice Ray Watson killed when their home is bombed. It is believed Judge Watson was the target.
- 16 July – Letters Patent issued for the Royal Commission into British Nuclear Tests in Australia
- 18 July – National Crime Authority is established.

=== August ===
- August – Brenda Hodge becomes the last person to be sentenced to death by Western Australia, and in the country as a whole, before the complete abolition of capital punishment. Her sentence is later commuted to life imprisonment.
- 1 August – Australian banks are deregulated.
- 7 August – Margaret, 35, and Seana Tapp, 9 are attacked and murdered by an unknown man in their suburban Melbourne home. Seana is also sexually assaulted.
- 21 August – The Federal budget is televised for the first time.

=== September ===
- 2 September – 7 people shot dead and 12 wounded in a bikie shootout between rival bikie gangs the Bandidos and Comancheros in the Sydney suburb of Milperra.
- 5 September – Western Australia becomes the last Australian state to abolish capital punishment for ordinary crimes (i.e. murder). New South Wales maintained it as a punishment for treason and piracy with violence until 1985†, when capital punishment was finally abolished in Australia.

=== October ===
- 1 October – National Film and Sound Archive (Screensound Australia) opens in Canberra.

=== November ===
- 6 November – In a crime that shocks the city, Melbourne schoolgirl Kylie Maybury is kidnapped, raped and murdered after being sent on an errand to buy a bag of sugar.
- 26 November –
  - Former NSW Corrective Services Minister Rex Jackson appears in Court on conspiracy charges for the early release of prisoners.
  - A good performance by Andrew Peacock in the leaders' televised debate boosts his poll ratings.

=== December ===
- 2 December – Hawke Government re-elected with a reduced majority.
- 7 December – Andrew Peacock and John Howard retain their respective positions in the Opposition.

== Arts and literature ==
- Tim Winton's novel Shallows wins the Miles Franklin Award

== Film ==
- Annie's Coming Out
- Razorback

== Television ==
- 30 January – Perfect Match is launched in the 5:30 pm timeslot, bringing in record ratings for that timeslot & ensuring Ten's Eyewitness News won the 6–7 p.m. timeslot.
- 3 February – Australia's first nationally televised telethon screens on Network Ten. It is a 26-hour effort to raise money for Australia's Olympic athletes.
- 11 February – The Nine Network's Hey Hey It's Saturday moves from Saturday mornings to the 9:30 pm timeslot and renamed Hey Hey It's Saturday Night.
- 26 July – French-American-Canadian animated television series Inspector Gadget begins on ABC.
- Christopher Skase purchases TVQ-0.
- Network Ten televises the 1984 Summer Olympics from Los Angeles. Also, all stations adopt a uniform on-air look for the first time.
- The first televised federal election debate takes place.

== Sport ==
=== VFL ===
- 29 September – Essendon (14.21.105) defeat Hawthorn (12.9.81) to win the 88th VFL premiership
- Brownlow Medal awarded to Peter Moore (Melbourne)

=== Rugby league ===
- 23 September – Minor premiers Canterbury Bulldogs defeat Parramatta Eels 6–4 to win the 77th NSWRL premiership. Western Suburbs Magpies finish in last position, claiming the wooden spoon.

=== Other ===
- 25 March – Robert de Castella is Australia's only competitor at the twelfth IAAF World Cross Country Championships, staged in New York, USA. He finishes in 21st place (34:08.0) in the race over 12,086 metres.
- 10 June – Andrew Lloyd wins the men's national marathon title, clocking 2:14:36 in Sydney, while Mora Main claims the women's title in 2:46:00.
- 6 November – Black Knight wins the Melbourne Cup.

== Births ==
- 1 January – Michael Witt, rugby league player
- 10 January – Trent Cutler, rugby league player
- 26 January – Ryan Hoffman, rugby league player
- 7 March – Jacob Lillyman, rugby league player
- 22 March – Tara Simmons, musician (died 2019)
- 30 March – Samantha Stosur, tennis player
- 3 April – Allana Slater, gymnast
- 10 April – Peter Veness, journalist (d. 2012)
- 13 April – Kris Britt, cricketer
- 20 April – Ashleigh Rudder, synchronised swimmer
- 26 April – Petrina Price, high jumper
- 3 May – Jacqui Dunn, artistic gymnast
- 4 May – Kiel Brown, field hockey midfielder
- 10 May – Alana Boyd, pole vaulter
- 15 May
  - Samantha Noble, actress
  - Beau Scott, Australian rugby league player
- 31 May – Jason Smith, actor
- 3 June – Todd Reid, tennis player (died 2018)
- June 14 – Jay Lyon, actor, musician and model
- 9 July – Alexandra Croak, gymnast & diver
- 20 July – James Mackay, actor
- 24 July – Patrick Harvey, actor
- 30 July – Trudy McIntosh, artistic gymnast
- 4 September – Adam Marshall, politician
- 20 September – Jason Chatfield, artist, comedian
- 3 October – Jarrod Bannister, athlete (d. 2018)
- 8 October — Laura Wells, International Plus Sized Model and Environmentalist.
- 17 October – Michelle Ang, actress
- 30 October – Cameron Ciraldo, rugby league player and coach
- 9 November – Delta Goodrem, singer and actress
- 13 November – Jamie Soward, rugby league player
- 14 November – Courtney Johns, Australian footballer
- 25 November – Peter Siddle, cricketer
- 28 November – Andrew Bogut, basketball player
- 8 December – Tim Paine, cricketer
- 12 December
  - Sophie Edington, swimmer
  - Daniel Merrett, Australian footballer
- 25 December – Lisa and Jessica Origliasso, singer/songwriters

== Deaths ==
- 9 January – Bob Dyer, television host (born in the United States) (b. 1909)
- 21 January – Alan Marshall, writer (b. 1902)
- 14 February – Kevin Barrett (died 1984), Australian rules footballer (b. 1915)
- 17 May – Nigel Drury, Queensland politician (b. 1911)
- 26 May – Hilda Abbott, Red Cross leader and wife of the administrator of the Northern Territory (b. 1890)
- 19 June – Sir Phillip Lynch, Victorian politician (b. 1933)
- 21 June – Denis Murphy, Queensland politician (b. 1936)
- 6 July – Mina Wylie, swimmer (b. 1891)
- 13 August – Clyde Cook, actor (b. 1891)
- 29 September – Hal Porter, author and playwright (b. 1911)
- 6 November – Kylie Maybury, murder victim (b. 1978)
- 20 December – Grace Cossington Smith, artist (b. 1892)

== See also ==
- 1984 in Australian television
- List of Australian films of 1984
