= Veness =

Veness is a surname. Notable people with the surname include:

- Amy Veness (1876–1960), British actress
- David Veness, British civil official
- Peter Veness (1984–2012), Australian journalist
