= The Cutting Room (TV series) =

Australian anthology series

The Cutting Room was an anthology series of 5 short films screened by the ABC in late 1985 to early 1986. The films were presented by John Baxter, giving critical commentary and information about the productions. Films shown had low budgets and were all less than an hour in duration. The films were created from 1973 (Come Out Fighting) to 1982 (Last Breakfast in Paradise). The series showcased some of the earlier works of those years' best known directors.

Richard Coleman in The Sydney Morning Herald referred to Baxter as "one of those people who make a living out of taking flicks too seriously". In her review of the final film, Anna Murdoch of The Age called Baxter's introductions "turgid".

== Episodes ==
1. Last Breakfast in Paradise by Meg Stewart
2. Out of It by Ken Cameron
3. The Singer and the Dancer by Gillian Armstrong
4. Temperament Unsuited by Ken Cameron
5. Come Out Fighting by Nigel Buesst
