= Christopher Truswell =

Australian actor

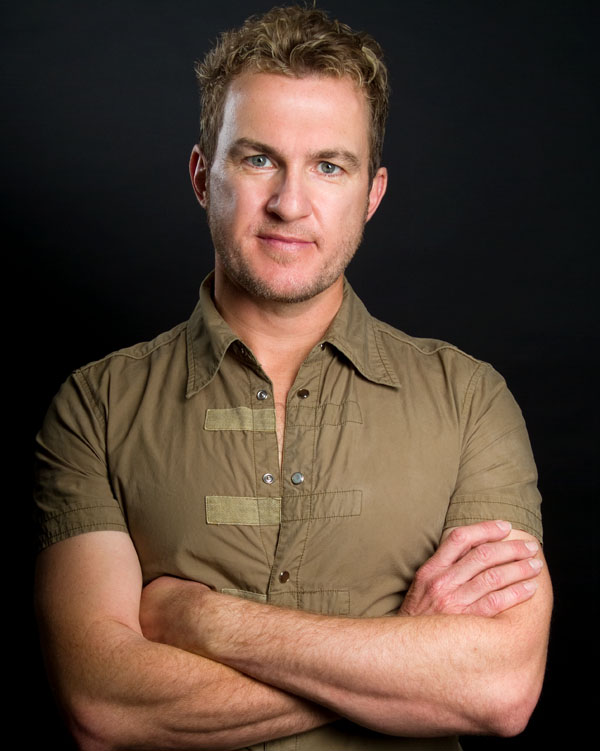
- Born: 31 January 1966 (age 60); Manchester, England
- Occupation: Actor / musician / voice-over
- Years active: 1984–present
- Known for: Hey Dad..!

Christopher Truswell (born 31 January 1966), is an English-born Australian actor, musician and voice-over artist, best known as Gerald 'Nudge' Noritas in Hey Dad..!

== Early life ==
Truswell was born in the north of England in 1966.

== Career ==
Truswell landed his first acting role at the age of 17, in 1984 Australian comedy/drama film Fast Talking, playing the character 'Moose', opposite Steve Bisley.

In 1986, Truswell began playing the long-running role of 'Nudge' in Australian TV sitcom Hey Dad..!, alongside Simone Buchanan and disgraced former actor Robert Hughes, also reuniting with Julie McGregor, with whom he had first appeared alongside in Fast Talking. After featuring in six of the show's ten seasons, he departed the series in 1991, to concentrate on pursuing film roles and furthering his musical ambitions.

That same year, Truswell was a member of short-lived Australian group 'Farmhouse', which was also made up of Georgie Parker, Emily Symons, his Hey Dad..! co-star Julie McGregor and Michael Horrocks. The group released a self-titled album of ten cover songs, including the single "These Boots Are Made for Walkin'".

Truswell subsequently had guest roles in several series, including the first season of sitcom All Together Now, sci-fi series Farscape and medical drama All Saints.

Truswell went on to voice the character of Rune Haako in 2002 sci-fi film Star Wars: Episode II – Attack of the Clones, which was filmed in Sydney. He later guested in an episode of Packed to the Rafters, before appearing in Underbelly: The Golden Mile, the 2010 third installment of true crime drama series Underbelly, playing the role of Bobby Flood.

In 2013, and again in 2014, Truswell guested in children's adventure series In Your Dreams. He then appeared in 2017 crime miniseries Blue Murder: Killer Cop, playing the role of Hal Tate, opposite Richard Roxburgh, before portraying Sergeant Bennett in LGBTQ film Riot with Damon Herriman and Xavier Samuel the following year.

More recently, Truswell embarked on a 2022 regional tour of a stage adaptation of comedy series Mother and Son, playing son, Arthur Beare, while Julie McGregor took on the role of mother, Maggie. His most recent credit is sci-fi feature film Last Ark, filmed in between lockdowns during the COVID-19 pandemic and due for completion in 2026.

== Personal life ==
Truswell and his partner, Suzanne Richards live in the Blue Mountains, in New South Wales. Prior to their relationship, Truswell initially saw Suzanne in a supermarket, before discovering her profile on an online dating site.

Truswell currently runs two Airbnb rentals.

== Filmography ==
=== Film ===
Year	Title	Role	Type	Ref
1984	Fast Talking	Moose	Feature film	
1989	Candy Regentag (aka Kiss the Night)	Leo (teen virgin)	Feature film	
2001	La Spagnola	Butcher	Feature film	
2002	Star Wars: Episode II – Attack of the Clones	RIC-920 / Rune Haako / Shu Mai / San Hill / Wat Tambor / Sun Fac (voice, uncredited)	Feature film	
2003	Ned	Nudge	Feature film	
2013	Custody	Shane	Short film	
2019	Smoke Between Trees	Loud Drunk	Film	
2022	Last Ark	Ross	Feature film	
2024	Terry Flynn	Terry Flynn	Short film	

=== Television ===
Year	Title	Role	Type	Ref
1984	Crime of the Decade	Bruce Smith	TV film	
1984	Rabbit Show	Rabbit Compere		
1985	The New Adventures of Blinky Bill	Bobby	Guest role	
1986–1991	Hey Dad..!	Gerald ’Nudge’ Noritas	Regular role	
1988	Watch the Shadows Dance (aka Nightmasters)	‘Fingers’ Hough	TV film	
1991	All Together Now	Rhys	Season 1, 1 episode	
1991	Farscape	Evran (voice)	1 episode	
2004	Skithouse	Guest performer		
2006; 2007	All Saints	Phil Masterson	2 episodes	
2008	Packed to the Rafters	Office Boss	1 episode	
2009	Scariacs	Annabelle’s Father	TV series	
2010	Underbelly: The Golden Mile	Detective Bobby Flood	3 episodes	
2012	Behind Mansion Walls	Guest role		
2013; 2014	In Your Dreams	Officer Domenico / Sergeant Schaffer		
2014; 2016	Deadly Women	Steve Clarkson / Former Husband		
2017	Blue Murder: Killer Cop	Hal Tate	Miniseries, 1 episode	
2018	Riot	Sergeant Bennett	TV film	

=== TV advertisements ===
Year	Title	Role	Ref
1995	Panasonic	Conductor	
1996	UDL	Skater Guy	
2003; 2005	Sydney Motor Show	Bogan / Survivor Contestant	
2006	Kellogg's "Superman Promotion"	Friend	
2011	Toyota	Family Guy	
2011; 2013	myPlates	Plate Spotter	
2012	Allianz	Trailer Guy	
2016	NRMA	NRMA Client	
2016	RAA	Classroom – Man	
2016	Scotts Lawn Builder	Dad	
2025	Golden Life Insurance	Gary	
2026	Optus	American Director	

== Theatre ==
Year	Title	Role	Type	Ref
1992	Don Juan	Peasant / Farmer	Seymour Centre, Sydney	
1993	Godspell	Chris	Sydney Opera House	
1993	Vroom Vroom the Musical	Warren Butcher	Theatre South	
1993	Dimboola	Dangles	Gary Penny Productions	
1993	A Bedfull of Foreigners	Heinz	Les Curry Productions	
1994	The Blues Brothers	Elwood Blues	State Theatre, Sydney with Livewire Productions	
1995	Bananas in Pyjamas	B1	Comedy Theatre, Melbourne with Gordon Frost Productions	
1996	Peter Pan	Cecco		
2001	The Wind in the Willows	Otter / Judge / Cop	Australian Shakespeare Company	
2004	Coasting Around the Edge	Greg / Eco Ranger	Museum of Australia	
2005	Musical Mystery Tour	Compere / Performer	Canuck Productions	
2005	The Merchant of Venice Beach	Lorenzo	The Kirk, Sydney with Bondi Theatre Company	
2008	Back to the 80s	Mr Cocker	AIPA Productions	
2009	Macbeth	Macduff	Wildfire Theatre Company	
2022	Mother and Son	Arthur Beare	Regional tour with Jally Entertainment	

== Discography ==
=== Albums ===
List of albums, with Australian chart positions
Title	Album details	Peak chart positions
Title	Album details	AUS
Farmhouse (as part of Farmhouse)	Released: November 1991; Format: CD, Cassette; Label: RCA (VPCD 0845)	95
