= 1984 in Australian television =

== Events ==
- January – English-born Australian businessman Alan Bond purchases STW9 Perth for just under $50 million.
- 9 January – British children's animated series Towser debuts on ABC before airing on ITV in the UK months later.
- 16 January – Australian situation comedy series Mother and Son debuts on ABC.
- 30 January – Perfect Match is launched in the 5:30 p.m. timeslot, bringing in record ratings for that timeslot and ensuring Ten's Eyewitness News won the 6–7 p.m. timeslot
- 3 February – Australia's first nationally televised telethon screens on Network Ten. It is a 26-hour effort to raise money for Australia's Olympic athletes.
- 18 February – The Nine Network's Hey Hey It's Saturday moves from a Breakfast Television format to the 9:30 p.m. timeslot, Primetime format and rebranded as Hey Hey It's Saturday Night.
- 2 April – British children's stop motion animated series, Paddington, debuts on ABC.
- 9 April – Guy Blackmore joins Eyewitness News.
- 20 April – The Royal Children's Hospital Appeal is televised on Seven Network on Good Friday in Melbourne.
- June – Christopher Skase purchases TVQ-0.
- 20 June – An electricity strike across Victoria cause all of Melbourne's TV stations to broadcast just two hours of programming closing down at 8:00 p.m.
- 26 July – French-American-Canadian animated series Inspector Gadget debuts on ABC at 5:30 p.m..
- July – Network Ten televises the 1984 Summer Olympics from Los Angeles. Also, all stations adopt a uniform on-air look for the first time.
- 8 October - Network Ten's long-running series, Prisoner, airs for the first time on British television under the title, "Prisoner: Cell Block H", on the ITV Yorkshire Television region. TVS and Channel Television follows in 1986, and eventually, all fourteen ITV regions will air the series, with most commencing in 1987 (Thames, Central, TSW and STV) and 1988 (Granada, Border, Tyne Tees, Grampian, Anglia, HTV Wales and West, and UTV in 1989).
- 19 October – Long running Australian current affairs program Dateline premieres on Network 0-28.
- 22 October – The first ever television incarnation of the popular koala, The New Adventures of Blinky Bill, debuts on ABC.
- The first televised federal election debate takes place.

=== Debuts ===
- 16 January – Mother and Son (ABC TV)
- 30 January – Perfect Match (Channel Ten)
- 18 February – Hey Hey It's Saturday Night (Channel Nine)
- 20 March – Waterfront (Channel Ten)
- 27 March – Eureka Stockade (Channel Seven)
- 1 June – Under Capricorn (Channel Nine)
- 11 June – Secret Valley (ABC TV)
- 2 July – Sweet and Sour (ABC TV)
- 16 July – Bodyline (Channel Ten)
- 30 July – The Love Game (Channel Seven)
- 17 October – City West (Network 0-28)
- 19 October – Dateline (Network 0-28)
- 22 October – The New Adventures of Blinky Bill (ABC TV)
- 5 November – The Gillies Report (ABC TV)
- 29 November – Brass Monkeys (Channel Seven)

=== New international programming ===
- 3 January – (United States) St. Elsewhere (Channel Nine)
- 9 January – (United Kingdom) Towser (ABC TV)
- 11 January – (United States) Manions of America (Channel Nine)
- 30 January – (United States) The Kwicky Koala Show (Channel Seven)
- 8 February – (United Kingdom) The Last Song (ABC TV)
- 10 February – (United Kingdom) Just Liz (ABC TV)
- 13 February – (United States) The A-Team (Channel Ten)
- 15 February – (United States) Blue Thunder (Channel Nine)
- 18 February – (United States) The Gary Coleman Show (Channel Nine)
- 19 February – (United States) V (1983) (Channel Ten)
- 28 February – (United Kingdom) Boys from the Blackstuff (ABC TV)
- 2 March – (United States) Automan (Channel Ten)
- 4 March – (United Kingdom) Storybook International (Channel 0/28)
- 9 March – (United Kingdom) The Machine Gunners (ABC TV)
- 16 March – (United States) Jennifer Slept Here (Channel Nine)
- 2 April – (United Kingdom) Paddington (ABC TV)
- 3 April – (United Kingdom) Reilly, Ace of Spies (ABC TV)
- 13 April – (United Kingdom) Give Us a Break (ABC TV)
- 14 April – (United States) Newhart (Channel Nine)
- 15 April – (United Kingdom) / (Republic of Ireland) The Irish R.M. (ABC TV)
- 13 May – (United States) Goodnight, Beantown (Channel Ten)
- 19 May – (United States) Gilligan's Planet (Channel Ten)
- 27 May – (United Kingdom) Winston Churchill: The Wilderness Years (ABC TV)
- 6 June – (United Kingdom) Agatha Christie's Partners in Crime (Channel Seven)
- 7 June – (United States) Scarecrow and Mrs. King (Channel Ten)
- 18 June – (Italy) AEIOU (ABC TV)
- 15 July – (United Kingdom) The Wind in the Willows (ABC TV)
- 17 July – (United Kingdom) All Electric Amusement Arcade (ABC TV)
- 20 July – (United Kingdom) Auf Weidersehen, Pet (ABC TV)
- 25 July – (Germany) / (Japan) Maya the Honey Bee (Channel Ten – Melbourne)
- 26 July – (France) / (United States) / (Canada) Inspector Gadget (ABC TV)
- 30 July – (United Kingdom) Beau Geste (ABC TV)
- 6 August – (United States) Cagney and Lacey (Channel Seven)
- 10 August – (United Kingdom) Shine on Harvey Moon (ABC TV)
- 20 August – (United Kingdom) Educating Marmalade (ABC TV)
- 22 August – (United Kingdom) Alas Smith and Jones (ABC TV)
- 4 September – (United States) A Woman Called Golda (Channel Ten)
- 7 September – (United States) Rainbow Brite (Channel Seven)
- 17 September – (United Kingdom) Robin of Sherwood (Channel Nine)
- 21 September – (United Kingdom) Only Fools and Horses (ABC TV)
- 1 October – (United Kingdom) The Black Adder (Channel Seven)
- 6 October/16 November – (United States) Whiz Kids (6 October: Channel Seven – Melbourne, 16 November: Channel Seven – Sydney)
- 10 October – (United States) Lifestyles of the Rich and Famous (Channel Nine)
- 14 October – (United States) V: The Final Battle (Channel Ten)
- 22 October/3 November – (United States) The Fantastic Miss Piggy Show (22 October: Channel Seven – Sydney, 3 November: Channel Seven – Melbourne)
- 22 October – (United States) Mr. Smith (Channel Seven)
- 23 October – (United Kingdom) The Dark Side of the Sun (ABC TV)
- 2 November – (United States) Big Bird in China (ABC TV)
- 3 November – (United States) Reggie (Channel Nine)
- 3 November – (United States) Heathcliff (Channel Nine)
- 7 November – (United Kingdom) Jane Eyre (1983) (ABC TV)
- 9 November – (United States) Don't Eat the Pictures (ABC TV)
- 11 November – (United States) Palmerstown, USA (Channel Nine)
- 14 November – (United States) Gloria (Channel Nine)
- 14 November – (United States) The Rousters (Channel Seven)
- 14 November – (Sweden) Mika (Channel 0/28)
- 14 November – (United Kingdom) Sorry! (ABC TV)
- 16 November – (United States) Legmen (Channel Ten)
- 16 November – (United States) The Duck Factory (Channel Nine)
- 17 November – (United States) Manimal (Channel Seven)
- 17 November – (United States) Mr. T (Channel Ten)
- 20 November – (United States) Emerald Point N.A.S. (Channel Ten)
- 21 November – (United States) 3-2-1 Contact (ABC TV)
- 30 November – (United States) Wizards and Warriors (Channel Ten)
- 7 December – (United States) Just Our Luck (Channel Seven)
- 8 December – (United Kingdom) The Doombolt Chase (Channel Seven)
- (United States) Shirt Tales (Channel Seven)
- (United States) Donkey Kong (Channel Seven)
- (Italy) Mr. Hiccup (Channel 0/28)
- (United States) Masquerade (Channel Ten?)

=== Changes to network affiliation ===
This is a list of programs which made their premiere on an Australian television network that had previously premiered on another Australian television network. The networks involved in the switch of allegiances are predominantly both free-to-air networks or both subscription television networks. Programs that have their free-to-air/subscription television premiere, after previously premiering on the opposite platform (free-to air to subscription/subscription to free-to air) are not included. In some cases, programs may still air on the original television network. This occurs predominantly with programs shared between subscription television networks.

==== International ====
Program	New network(s)	Previous network(s)	Date
(United States) Hong Kong Phooey	Channel Seven	Channel Nine	4 January
(United States) Roger Ramjet	ABC TV	Channel Seven	6 March
(United States) Jabberjaw	Channel Seven	Channel Nine	31 August

== Television shows ==
=== 1950s ===
- Mr. Squiggle and Friends (1959–1999)

=== 1960s ===
- Four Corners (1961–present)

=== 1970s ===
- Hey Hey It's Saturday (1971–1999, 2009–2010)
- Young Talent Time (1971–1989)
- Countdown (1974–1987)
- 60 Minutes (1979–present)
- Prisoner (1979–1986)

=== 1980s ===
- Kingswood Country (1980–1984)
- Sale of the Century (1980–present)
- Wheel of Fortune (1981–present)
- Sunday (1981–present)
- Today (1982–present)

== Ending this year ==
Date	Show	Channel	Debut
7 February	Waterloo Station	Channel Nine	2 February 1983
21 March	Waterfront	Channel Ten	20 March 1984
23 July	Cop Shop	Channel Seven	28 November 1977
2 August	Sweet and Sour	ABC TV	2 July 1984
7 November	Australia You're Standing In It	ABC TV	26 September 1983
1 September	Kingswood Country	Channel Seven	30 January 1980
1 December	Carson's Law	Channel Ten	24 January 1983

== See also ==
- 1984 in Australia
- List of Australian films of 1984
