= Georgie Parker =

Australian actress (born 1964)

- Born: Georgina Parker; 16 December 1964 (age 61); Sydney, New South Wales, Australia
- Other name: Georgia Parker
- Occupation: Actress
- Years active: 1988–present
- Notable work: A Country Practice; All Saints; Home and Away
- Spouse: Steve Worland (1999–present)
- Children: 1

Georgina Parker (born 16 December 1964) is an Australian television soap actress and has also appeared in film and theatre. She is a double Gold Logie winner, best known for her acting roles in Australian soap operas; as Lucy Gardiner (later Tyler) in A Country Practice; as Theresa 'Terri' Sullivan in All Saints; and as Roo Stewart in Home and Away, as well as being a presenter on the children's program Play School.

== Early life ==
Parker was born in 1964. She is the daughter of iconic Australian furniture designer Tony Parker of Parker Furniture. Parker grew up in the Sydney North Shore suburb of St Ives, where she attended St Ives North Public School and later Abbotsleigh School for Girls in Sydney. Parker spent two years at a performing arts school studying dancing and drama. She appeared in various theatre and dance productions, including the musical Nunsense. Parker stopped dancing after she realised that people only saw her as a dancer and not an actor who could dance. In between jobs, Parker worked in a video shop, as a waitress, and taught fitness classes to actors.

== Career ==
Parker made her screen acting debut in television commercials aged 19. She then guested in Body Business and Willing and Abel, before she had a small role in the Yahoo Serious film Young Einstein. In 1988, she had a supporting role in A Country Practice as Ben Green's (Nicholas Bufalo) fiancée, pianist Barbara Gottlieb. Fifteen months later, Parker joined the main cast of A Country Practice as nurse Lucy Gardiner. She originally auditioned for park ranger Cathy Hayden, (later played by Kate Raison). Parker admitted that she was glad she did not get cast as Cathy as Raison was more suited to the role, and she was comfortable as Lucy. Parker became a fixture on Australian television through her role as Lucy. She also appeared as Despina, Memo's love interest, in the sitcom Acropolis Now. She had starring roles in the television series Over the Hill in 1994 and as young firefighter "Mad Dog" Cartwright in the first season of Fire in 1995.

From 1998 until 2005, Parker played Sister Teresa (Terri) Sullivan, a nurse and former nun, in the Australian medical drama series All Saints, for which she was awarded a number of Logies, including 'Most Popular Actress' in 2001. This saw her win the award for the fourth time, having already won 3 times from 1991 to 1993 for her role on A Country Practice. In 2001 & 2002 Parker won the Gold Logie or 'Most Popular TV Personality' firmly cementing her place as an Australian television favourite.

In 2002, Parker took part in the Australian musical theatre production The Man from Snowy River: Arena Spectacular, where she appeared as Kate Conroy, the daughter of the Station owner, John Conroy - and the romantic interest of Jim Ryan (The Man).

In 2004 Parker starred in the Sydney Theatre Company's production of Scenes from a Separation, as journalist Nina Molyneux. After concluding her work on All Saints in 2005, Parker starred in the Ensemble Theatre's production of Chapter Two as actress Jennie MacLaine.

In 2006, she joined the Nine Network to host the new TV show, Clever. She also appeared on the ABC children's show Play School and starred in the telemovie Stepfather of the Bride for the same network. In 2006 she also headlined the Network Ten telemovie The Society Murders. She was a semi-regular guest on the show The Glass House.

She was in The Wiggles DVD Racing to the Rainbow.

Georgie Parker starred in the drama Emerald Falls, which aired on Network Ten. She also briefly hosted Animal Emergency for Channel Nine in 2008, and acted as the New South Wales Premier in the telemovie Scorched for Channel Nine in 2008.

Parker released a children's album in 2008.

In 2010, she appeared as Det. Senior Sergeant Susan Blake on the Australian drama City Homicide. She played Miss Monica in David Williamson's Rhinestone Rex and Miss Monica.

The Seven Network announced in August 2010 that Parker would return to screens playing the character of Roo Stewart in Home and Away. The character was previously portrayed by Justine Clarke from 1988 to 1989.

In 2011, Parker appeared on Who Do You Think You Are?, season 3, episode 6, in which she explored the strength and courage shown by the women on both sides of her family. On her mother's side, Georgie's quest begins with her maternal grandmother Grace, before investigating her father's maternal ancestors, the Breckenridges.

In 2022, Parker appeared in the theatre play Rhinestone Rex and Miss Monica. In 2024, Ensemble Theatre would announce Parker as part of their 2025 lineup.

On 7 November 2025, Parker was cast in Paramount+'s upcoming series Dalliance.

== Personal life ==
She has been married since December 1999 to Steve Worland, the screenwriter of the Fox Searchlight feature film Bootmen (2000). Worland is also an action-adventure novelist and wrote Velocity (2012) and Combustion (2013). They have a daughter, Holly, born in September 2000. Parker has Scoliosis and is an ambassador of the National Scoliosis Foundation

== Discography ==
=== Albums ===
List of albums, with Australian chart positions
Title	Album details	Peak chart positions
Title	Album details	AUS
Farmhouse (as part of Farmhouse)	Released: November 1991; Format: CD, Cassette; Label: RCA (VPCD 0845)	95
Here Comes the Sun	Released: 2008; Format: CD; Label: ABC for Kids (R-301468-2)	—
Carnival of the Animals (with Justine Clarke & Jay Laga'aia)	Released: 2009; Format: 2×CD; Label: ABC Classics (ABC 476 3686)	—

== Filmography ==
=== Film ===
Year	Title	Role	Type
1988	The 13th Floor	Maid	Feature film
1988	Young Einstein	Country Girl Fan	Feature film
2006	Irresistible	Jen	Feature film
2010	Santa's Apprentice	Mrs. Poulmer (voice in English version)	Animated film
2017	Stranger	May	Film Short
2023	13th Summer	Debbie Collins	Feature film
2024	He Loves Me Not	Marissa	Feature film

=== Television ===
Year	Title	Role	Notes
1986	Body Business	Model in Commercial	Miniseries
1987	Willing and Abel		
1987	Danger Down Under (aka Reed Down Under)	Cabbie	TV film
1988	Barlow and Chambers: A Long Way From Home (aka Dadah Is Death)	Corine Johnstone	TV miniseries, 2 episodes
1988	A Country Practice	Barbara Gottlieb	Guest
1989	Rafferty's Rules	Lucy	Episode: "Politburo"
1989–1992	A Country Practice	Sister Lucy Gardiner	Series regular
1992	All Together Now	Brenda Beanley	Episode: "Love Me Tender"
1992	Acropolis Now	Despina Hatzipapadopoulos	10 episodes
1992	G.P.	Marcey Heywood	Episode: "Funny Business"
1995	Fire	Firefighter Morgan "Mad Dog" Cartwright	Series regular
1997	Reprisal	Janis	TV film
1998–2005	All Saints	Terri Sullivan	Series regular
2002	The Man from Snowy River: Arena Spectacular	Kate Conroy	TV special
2006	The Society Murders	Emma Connell	TV film
2006	Stepfather of the Bride	Catriona	TV film
2006	The Wiggles: Racing to the Rainbow	Queen of the Rainbow	Video
2006, 2008	Stupid, Stupid Man	Dr. McPherson / Uta	Episodes: "Prophylaxis" (2006), "Coqtober" (2008)
2008	Animal Emergency	Narrator	TV series
2008	Emerald Falls	Joni Ferguson	TV film
2008	Scorched	Angela Boardman	TV film
2010	City Homicide	Susan Blake	Episodes: "Aussie! Aussie! Aussie!", "Good Cop/Bad Cop"
2010 – Present	Home and Away	Ruth "Roo" Stewart	Regular: 2,000 + Episodes
2023	Watch Dogs	Georgie	TV series
2026	Dalliance	Rose	TV series: 6 Episodes

=== Appearances as self ===
Year	Title	Role	Notes
1991	Celebrity Family Feud	Contestant	TV series, 1 episode
1991	The Main Event	Contestant (with Julie McGregor, Agro, Lorrae Desmond, Andrew Blackman & Mike Carlton)	TV series, 2 episodes
1991, 1994	Celebrity Wheel of Fortune	Contestant	TV series, 2 episodes
1992, 1996, 2011, 2012	Carols in the Domain	Guest / Singer	TV special
1993	Sale of the Century	Contestant	TV series, 1 episode
1994	Over the Hill	Sandy Spencer	TV series, 13 episodes
1999	All-Star Squares	Contestant	TV series, 1 episode
2005	Medical Emergency	Narrator	TV series
2006–2010	Play School	Presenter	TV series, 32 episodes
2006	Clever	Host	TV series, 1 episode
2011	Who Do You Think You Are?	Subject	TV series, season 3, episode 6
2019	Anh's Brush with Fame	Subject	TV series, 1 episode

== Theatre ==
Year	Title	Role	Theatre/company	Ref
1985	Jack and Jill - The Panto		Tivoli Theatre	
1986	Twelve Angry People		Ross Coleman Performing Arts Studio	
1986	The Other Room		Ross Coleman Performing Arts Studio, Sydney	
1987	Nunsense		Footbridge Theatre Camperdown, Twelfth Night Theatre & Canberra Theatre	
1988	She Shall Have Music		University of Sydney & Footbridge Theatre, Camperdown	
1993	How to Succeed in Business Without Really Trying	Rosemary	University of Sydney, Lyric Theatre & His Majesty's Theatre, Perth	
1995	The Threepenny Opera	Polly	Suncorp Theatre with Queensland Theatre Company	
1995	All In the Timing		Wharf Theatre, Sydney	
1996	Wait Until Dark		Majestic Cinemas	
1996	Crazy for You		Theatre Royal, Sydney	
1997	Here Comes Showtime!		Marian Street Theatre	
2002	The Man from Snowy River: Arena Spectacular	Kate Conroy	Sydney Entertainment Centre, Brisbane Entertainment Centre, Rod Laver Arena, Burswood Dome & Adelaide Entertainment Centre	
2002	Chapter Two	Jennie MacLaine	Ensemble Theatre & Parade Theatre	
2004	Scenes from a Separation	Nina Molyneux	Sydney Theatre Company at Sydney Opera House	
2006	Love Letters	Melissa Gardener	Parade Theatre & Tuggeranong Arts Centre	
2006	They're Playing Our Song	Sonia Walsk	Ensemble Theatre	
2006	Play School 40th Birthday		Sydney Opera House	
2007	Rabbit Hole		Ensemble Theatre & The Playhouse, ACT	
2008	Carols By Candlelight		Sidney Myer Music Bowl	
2009	Let the Sunshine	Ros	Ensemble Theatre	
2010; 2022	Rhinestone Rex and Miss Monica	Miss Monica	Ensemble Theatre	
2011	Celebrity Autobiography		Sydney Opera House	
2012	8 - The Play		Her Majesty's Theatre, Melbourne & Sydney Town Hall	
2013	Rapture, Blister, Burn	Catherine	Ensemble Theatre	
2016	Barefoot in the Park	Corie's mother, Mrs Banks	Ensemble Theatre	
2016	The Casting Couch with Todd McKenney		Ensemble Theatre	
2018	Luna Gale	Caroline	Ensemble Theatre	
2019	Murder on the Wireless (double bill)	Violet Smith in The Solitary Cyclist / Teresa Scott in The Deadly Wives Club	Ensemble Theatre	
2022	Rhinestone Rex and Miss Monica	Monica	Ensemble Theatre	
2024	The Great Divide	Alex	Ensemble Theatre	
2025	How To Plot A Hit In Two Days		Ensemble Theatre	
2025	Rhinestone Rex and Miss Monica	Monica	Queensland Theatre Co	

== Awards and nominations ==
=== ARIA Music Awards ===
The ARIA Music Awards is an annual ceremony presented by Australian Recording Industry Association (ARIA), which recognise excellence, innovation, and achievement across all genres of the music of Australia. They commenced in 1987.

Year	Nominee / work	Award	Result	Ref.
2009	Here Comes The Sun	Best Children's Album	Nominated	

=== Logie Awards ===
Parker has been nominated for Logie Awards several times, and has won many Logies, including two Gold Logies.

Awards for Georgie Parker include:

Year	Category	Work	Result
1990	Most Popular New Talent	A Country Practice	Won
1991	Most Popular Actress	A Country Practice	Won
1992	Most Popular Actress	A Country Practice	Won
1992	Gold Logie	A Country Practice	Nominated
1993	Most Popular Actress	A Country Practice	Won
1993	Gold Logie	A Country Practice	Nominated
1999	Gold Logie	All Saints	Nominated
1999	Most Popular Actress	All Saints	Nominated
2000	Gold Logie	All Saints	Nominated
2000	Most Popular Actress	All Saints	Nominated
2001	Gold Logie	All Saints	Won
2001	Most Popular Actress	All Saints	Nominated
2002	Gold Logie	All Saints	Won
2002	Most Outstanding Actress	All Saints	Nominated
2002	Most Popular Actress	All Saints	Nominated
2003	Gold Logie	All Saints	Nominated
2003	Most Popular Actress	All Saints	Nominated
2004	Gold Logie	All Saints	Nominated
2005	Gold Logie	All Saints	Nominated

Awards and achievements
Preceded by Lisa McCune for Blue Heelers	Gold Logie Award; Most Popular Personality on Australian Television; 2001–2002 for All Saints	Succeeded by Rove McManus for Rove Live
