= Temperament Unsuited =

1978 short film

- Directed by: Ken Cameron
- Written by: Ken Cameron
- Produced by: Christine Dunstan; Ross Matthews; Ken Cameron
- Starring: Steve J. Spears; Robyn Nevin
- Cinematography: Russell Boyd
- Edited by: David Huggett
- Music by: Robert Murphy
- Release date: 1978
- Running time: 54 minutes
- Country: Australia
- Language: English
- Budget: $30,000

Temperament Unsuited is a 1978 Australian short film directed by Ken Cameron and starring Steve J. Spears, Robyn Nevin and Ken Goodlet. The film is about a school teacher.

Colin Bennett of the Age said it was an "accurate looking, ruefully funny picture of a trainee teacher played by playwright Steven J. Spears) who briefly tries to buck the establishment system at a NSW high school." In the Sydney Morning Herald Martha DuBose noted "Spears is delightful as the callow nonconformist. Cameron's script and his direction are bright and funny, and he shows a special sensitivity when handling children." Ken Quinnell of Filmnews says Cameron's "films are carefully crafted and Temperament Unsuited, while more of a consolidation than a step forward, is nonetheless interesting." and notes "Confrontations between individuals and entrenched beliefs offer a rich source of drama and, although Cameron handles it well, he does fail to render the conflict with sufficient excitement to make it entirely accessible." A review in the journal Education said it "is a highly entertaining drama which explores the predicament faced by an unconventional student teacher attempting to orient himself in the stifling, conservative world of secondary school teaching."

In 1986 it was showcased on The Cutting Room with Brian Courtis of the Age commenting "On occasion, the film crawls along, but there are strong performances from both Spears and Goodlet, both dealing well with the mix of serious drama and comedy in Cameron's script." The Age's Michael Shmith said "Although Temperament Unsuited is only eight years old, it appears vintage stuff. Somehow, in the intervening years, film-making has improved, not only in technical quality but in its power to make a point in not so quite an obvious way."

Temperament Unsuited won the Best Short Film Award at the 1978 Australian Film Institute Awards.

== Cast ==
- Steve J. Spears as Mark
- Robyn Nevin as Anne
- Deborah Kennedy as Christine
- Ken Goodlet as Ted 'Seedy' Yates
- Peter Carroll as Ross Elliot
- Jude Kuring as Ms Redmond
- Paul Mason as Visual Aids Tutor
- Jenny McNae as Drama Tutor
- Max Phipps as Supervisor
- Phil Ross as Christine's Parents
- Don Reid as Deputy Principal
- Jacqueline Kott as Christine's Parents
- Victoria Nicholls as Karen
- Tony Sheldon as Tod
- Kay Self as Ms Scott
- Basia Bonkowski as Ms Prosser
