= Animal Emergency =

- Genre: Observational Documentary; Reality/Real-Life
- Narrated by: Georgie Parker
- Country of origin: Australia
- Original language: English
- No. of seasons: 1

Production
- Running time: 60 minutes

Original release
- Network: Nine Network
- Release: 11 March 2008

Animal Emergency is an Australian observational documentary series that began airing on the Nine Network on 16 March 2008. It is narrated by Gold Logie winner Georgie Parker. Animal Emergency follows the daily happenings of the Lort-Smith Animal Hospital in Melbourne.

Some media outlets have reported the title of the program to be Animal Hospital; Nine Network has since clarified that this is incorrect, and the show will indeed be titled Animal Emergency.
