= Fighting Back (1982 Australian film) =

- Directed by: Michael Caulfield
- Written by: Tom Jeffrey; Michael Cove
- Based on: "Tom" by John Embling
- Produced by: Tom Jeffrey, Sue Milliken
- Starring: Lewis Fitz-Gerald; Paul Smith; Anne Haddy; Wynn Roberts
- Cinematography: John Seale
- Edited by: Ron Williams
- Release date: 1982
- Running time: 102 minutes
- Country: Australia
- Language: English
- Box office: A$121,000 (Australia)

Fighting Back is a 1982 Australian film about troubled teenagers.

== Synopsis ==
Dedicated schoolteacher, John Embling takes Tom, a troubled and violent 13-year-old boy, under his wing, at the behest of his fellow teachers and his job. By spending meaningful time with Tom on a camping trip and through liaising with his mother, John discovers Tom’s angst is rooted in his father’s abandonment of him and his mother. He gradually gets through to Tom, and a meaningful relationship develops between the pair, as Tom begins to see John as a mentor and a father figure.

== Cast ==
- Lewis Fitz-Gerald as John Embling
- Paul Smith as Tom Goodwood
- Robyn Nevin as Mary
- Kris McQuade as Mrs Goodwood
- Gillian Jones as English teacher
- Anne Haddy as Magistrate
- Wynn Roberts as Payne
- Ben Gabriel as Moreland
- Caroline Gillmer as Rosemary

== Production ==
The film was based on the best selling novel, "Tom", by John Embling. It was produced by Adam Packer Film Productions and was screened at the Australian Film Institute.

== Release ==
The film was released in theatres on 1 June 1982.

== Reception ==
Australian film critic David Stratton from At the Movies, reviewed the film for The International Film Guide, saying: "A promising debut was made by direct(or) Michael Caulfield with Fighting Back, the story of a schoolteacher’s efforts to help a deeply disturbed 13-year-old boy. Though the character of the teacher is under-developed, that of the boy presented in-depth; and there is an amazingly tough performance from young Paul Smith in the role."

American film critic Leonard Maltin reviewed the film for Leonard Maltin's Movie Guide in 2001, saying “Ambitious if not entirely successful drama of teacher Fitz-Gerald trying to tame unruly, illiterate 13-year old (Smith, excellent in acting debut)." He gave it two and a half stars.

== Awards ==
Actress Kris McQuade won a 1982 Australian Film Institute Award for Best Supporting Actress for her performance as Mrs Goodwood, the boy's long-suffering mother.
