= The Coca-Cola Kid =

1985 film by Dušan Makavejev

- Promotional movie poster for the film
- Directed by: Dušan Makavejev
- Screenplay by: Frank Moorhouse
- Based on: "The Americans, Baby" "The Electrical Experience" by Frank Moorhouse
- Produced by: Les Lithgow; Sylvie Le Clezio; David Roe
- Starring: Eric Roberts; Greta Scacchi; Bill Kerr
- Cinematography: Dean Semler
- Edited by: John Scott
- Music by: William Motzing
- Production companies: Cinema Enterprises; Australian Film Commission; Grand Bay Films International
- Distributed by: Roadshow Film Distributors
- Release dates: 14 July 1985 (U.S.); 19 July 1985 (UK); 29 August 1985 (Australia)
- Running time: 98 minutes
- Country: Australia
- Language: English
- Budget: A$3 million
- Box office: $36,365 (Australia)

The Coca-Cola Kid is a 1985 Australian romantic comedy film. It was directed by Dušan Makavejev and stars Eric Roberts and Greta Scacchi. The film is based on the short stories "The Americans, Baby", and "The Electrical Experience" by Frank Moorhouse, who wrote the screenplay. It was entered into the 1985 Cannes Film Festival.

== Plot ==
Becker, a hotshot American marketing executive (played by Roberts) from The Coca-Cola Company, visits their Australian operations in Sydney and tries to figure out why a tiny corner of Australia (the fictional town of Anderson Valley) has so far resisted all of Coke's products. He literally bumps into the secretary (played by Scacchi) who is assigned to help him.

Becker discovers that a local producer of soft drinks run by an old eccentric has been successfully fending off the American brand name products. The executive vows an all out marketing war with the eccentric but eventually comes to reconsider his role as a cog in Coca-Cola's giant corporate machinery. Along the way there are humorous subplots involving the office manager's violent ex-husband, Becker's attempt to find the 'Australian sound', and an odd waiter who is under the mistaken belief that Becker is a secret agent.

== Cast ==
- Eric Roberts as Becker
- Greta Scacchi as Terri
- Rebecca Smart as "DMZ", her daughter
- Bill Kerr as T. George McDowell
- Chris Haywood as Kim
- Kris McQuade as Juliana
- Max Gillies as Frank Hunter
- Tony Barry as Bushman
- Paul Chubb as Fred
- David Slingsby as The waiter
- Tim Finn as Phillip
- Colleen Clifford as Mrs Haversham
- Esben Storm as Country Hotel Manager
- Steve Dodd as Mr Joe
- Ian Gilmour as Marjorie
- Gia Carides as Chambermaid
- David Argue as Newspaper Vendor
- Julie Nihill, Linda Nagle, and Fiona Hallett as Marching Girls
- Ricky Fataar, Mark Moffatt, Paul Hester, and Rex Goh as Rock musicians
- Jane Markey as Doris
- Mick Conway with Palz Vaughan, Kim Cook, Jim Niven, and Kim Constable as Country musicians
- Peter Armstrong as Security guard
- Pola as Shirley
- Debbie Conway as Girl with camera
- Angelo D'Angelo as Projectionist

== Production ==
David Stratton gave a copy of Frank Moorhouse's book The Americans, Baby to Dušan Makavejev when he attended the Sydney Film Festival in 1975 with Sweet Movie. Production of the movie was difficult in part because of Makavejev's work methods, which were different from the way films were normally made in Australia. Denny Lawrence came on board the film as a consultant.

The Coca-Cola Kid was shot on location in Sydney and the Blue Mountains.

== Reception ==
Rotten Tomatoes gives The Coca-Cola Kid a rating of 47% from 17 reviews. Roger Ebert gave the film 3 out of 4 stars and said that the movie was "filled with moments of inspiration," but believed that "the last half of the film [...] does not quite deliver on the promises of the first half."

=== Box office ===
The Coca-Cola Kid grossed $36,365 at the box office in Australia.

== Home media ==
MGM Home Entertainment released the Region 1 DVD in the United States on 16 April 2002. Umbrella Entertainment released a region free version in May 2009. The DVD includes special features such as the theatrical trailer, and an interview with Greta Scacchi and David Roe titled The Real Thing. Fun City Edition released the film on Blu-ray in the United States on 16 June 2022. In addition to the features included in the 2009 DVD, the Blu-ray contains an interview with Eric Roberts and a new audio commentary.

== Accolades ==
Award	Category	Subject	Result
AACTA Awards (1985 AFI Awards)	Best Adapted Screenplay	Frank Moorhouse	Nominated
AACTA Awards (1985 AFI Awards)	Best Cinematography	Dean Semler	Nominated
AACTA Awards (1985 AFI Awards)	Best Editing	John Scott	Nominated
AACTA Awards (1985 AFI Awards)	Best Original Music Score	William Motzing	Nominated
AACTA Awards (1985 AFI Awards)	Best Sound	Helen Brown	Nominated
AACTA Awards (1985 AFI Awards)	Best Sound	Gethin Creagh	Nominated
AACTA Awards (1985 AFI Awards)	Best Sound	Dean Gawen	Nominated
AACTA Awards (1985 AFI Awards)	Best Sound	Mark Lewis	Nominated
AACTA Awards (1985 AFI Awards)	Best Sound	Martin Oswin	Nominated
AACTA Awards (1985 AFI Awards)	Best Production Design	Graham 'Grace' Walker	Nominated
AACTA Awards (1985 AFI Awards)	Best Costume Design	Terry Ryan	Nominated
Cannes Film Festival	Palme d'Or	Dušan Makavejev	Nominated
