= Come Out Fighting (1973 film) =

- Directed by: Nigel Buesst
- Written by: Nigel Buesst
- Based on: a play by Harry Martin
- Produced by: Nigel Buesst
- Starring: Michael Karpaney
- Cinematography: Byron Kennedy
- Edited by: Tony Patterson
- Music by: Smetana
- Release date: July 1973
- Running time: 50 mins
- Country: Australia
- Language: English
- Budget: $6,000

Come Out Fighting is a short 1973 Australian feature directed by Nigel Buesst.

== Plot ==
Aboriginal boxer Al Dawson is torn by the demands of fight promoters and aboriginal protestors. He eventually decides to reject them all and gives away his chance at a world title.

== Cast ==
- Michael Karpaney as Al Dawson
- Joey Collins as Eddie
- Bethany Lee as Susan Parker
- Cliff Neate as Stan Harkness
- Peter Green as Rocky Garibaldi
- Bob Horsfall as Phil Bench
- Brian Torrens as Carl Price
- Peter Adams as Garry Day
- Martin Phelan as student
- Harry Williams as aboriginal drinker
- Max Pescud as trainer
- Bert Williams as aboriginal drinker
- Kris McQuade as Sporting World hostess
- John Jacobs as trainer
- John Duigan as student

== Production ==
The film was shot on 16mm and was made with the assistance of the Experimental Film and Television Fund. Filming completed by July 1973.

== Reception ==
In the Sydney Morning Herald Martha DuBose noted "It is an interesting and depressingly real story, Australian in context but universally comprehensible. Buesst has enhanced the realism of the story by including "live" fight sequences and by directing non-professional Michael Karpaney as the boxer with complete sureness in a cast of professional players."

In 1986 it was showcased on The Cutting Room where Anna Murdoch of the Age finishes her review "I don't know if Buesst wanted us to feel sorry for Al, so vulnerable at the hands of the white trash. If he did, I don't think he achieved it. Al is exploitable because he somehow lacks a will, a stamp. The film ended with a whimper and Al's character disappeared with it".

Dylan Rainforth wrote an annotation on the film for Senses of Cinema where he writes "With Come Out Fighting Buesst became the first to use boxing as a way to cinematically address racism and Aboriginal experience, and passing references are made to this significant earlier tradition throughout the film."
