= Out of It (1977 film) =

1977 short film

- Directed by: Ken Cameron
- Written by: Ken Cameron
- Produced by: Ken Cameron
- Starring: Glenn Mason; Chris Haywood; George Spartels
- Cinematography: David Gribble
- Edited by: David Huggett
- Music by: Robert Murphy
- Production companies: Film Radio and Television Board of the Australia Council
- Release date: 27 June 1977
- Running time: 50 minutes
- Country: Australia
- Language: English
- Budget: $23,000

Out of It is a 1977 Australian film created by Ken Cameron. It is a road movie where three unemployed friends head north after a robbery goes wrong.

== Synopsis ==
Unemployed Larry is age 24, living with his mother in Sydney's industrialised western suburbs and working in a car-wrecking yard. Bored with the limitations of his job, Larry and his friends, Warren and Tony begin stripping stolen cars and selling the parts to local yards to get by. Larry also borrows money from his girlfriend, Wendy, and uses his welfare cheque to bet on dogs that never win.

Realising they're going nowhere fast, Larry joins Warren and Tony in a dodgy warehouse robbery, organised by Jacko and his boss Ferret, stealing televisions, cassettes and radios. When the robbery is interrupted by a patrol car, the three flee to Rockdale railway station, where they consider their next move. With an ill-conceived plan, they ultimately skip town and head up the highway to Nambucca Heads.

In the ensuing debacle, Tony loses his car and Warren loses his beloved greyhound and spends a week in a country lock-up. Larry emerges unscathed, but considers himself better for the experience, for having done something to reminisce about. When he receives his next welfare cheque, Larry puts a bet on 'Coolangatta Miss' – with the post-script, "she didn't come in, of course".

== Cast ==
- Glenn Mason as Larry
- Chris Haywood as Warren
- George Spartels as Tony
- Martin Harris as Boyle
- Terry Camilleri as Jacko
- Saviour Sammut as Ferret
- Arna-Maria Winchester as Hitch-Hiker
- Margaret Nelson as Wendy

== Release ==
The film was released theatrically on 27 June 1977. It screened in Sydney as part of a double feature, together with Backroads.

== Reception ==
Barbara Aylsen of Filmnews said: "As a portrait of the vacuum that is often euphemistically called youth it's nostaliga (sic) if you care to remember, and an insight if you want to find out." Sandra Hall, writing for The Bulletin, called it "a nicely ironic story about three likable bumblers caught up in petty crime on the outskirts of F. J. Holden country."

When it aired on Channel Ten in 1980, Don Groves wrote in The Sydney Morning Herald: "On a tiny budget ($23,000), writer-director Ken Cameron has achieved a remarkably high standard of film-making." In 1986, it was showcased on The Cutting Room, where The Age's Judith Fox called it "an essay on the Aussie loser, a road movie which investigates the loss of focus of three youths as a journey in itself."
