= Punishment (TV series) =

- Genre: Drama; Soap opera
- Created by: Reg Watson
- Country of origin: Australia
- Original language: English
- No. of seasons: 1
- No. of episodes: 26

Production
- Producer: Alan Coleman
- Running time: 60 minutes
- Production company: Reg Grundy Organisation

Original release
- Network: Network Ten
- Release: 14 February 1981 – 27 April 1982

Punishment is an Australian television soap opera made by the Reg Grundy Organisation for Network Ten in 1981. It debuted in Melbourne and Brisbane on Saturday 14 February 1981, and a few days later in Sydney on Friday 20 February 1981.

Set in a fictional men's prison, the series attempted to present a male version of its female counterpart Prisoner, which was set in a woman's prison. Attempts by the show's makers to differentiate the series from Prisoner saw Punishment imbued with greater realism; however, the formula did not attract high viewing figures. Network Ten deemed the new series a failure after only three episodes had gone to air, and in Melbourne and Sydney it was removed from the schedules after the fourth episode had been shown. Several more episodes were shown in Brisbane, as their Network Ten affiliate TVQ-0 had scheduled two episodes per week as opposed to the weekly broadcasts in Melbourne and Sydney. The series resumed at the end of the ratings period in November 1981, and then continued in Sydney in a late night slot - often after midnight - with the series being completed on 27 April 1982. Only the first 13 episodes appear to have been broadcast in Melbourne.

Unusually for a soap opera, the series was taped using the single camera technique.

Grundy produced Punishment mainly to complement Prisoner in international sales, to a point that the pilot was initially telecast in the United States before debuting in Australia. KTLA, the Los Angeles television station that helped launched Prisoner in the United States, originally expressed interest in doing the same with Punishment; it is unknown if KTLA had screened any episodes of Punishment, in light of its failure on Network Ten in Australia.

The program was created by Reg Watson and produced and directed by Alan Coleman. The regular cast featured many notable Australian actors. Mel Gibson played a prisoner in the first two episodes. Kris McQuade played the girlfriend of Gibson's character and was phased out of the series after the first few episodes due to Gibson's departure.

== Cast ==
- Mel Gibson as Rick Munro (2 episodes)
- Ken Wayne as Jack Hudson
- Brian Wenzel as Wally Webb
- Ross Thompson as Mike Rogers
- Barry Crocker as Governor Alan Smith
- Ralph Cotterill as Russell Davis
- Michael Preston as Larry Morrison
- Michele Fawdon as Susan Morrison
- Brian Harrison as Sam Wells
- Michael Smith as Paul Wells
- George Spartels as David Roberts
- Julie McGregor as Julie Smith
- Kris McQuade as Kate Randall
- Cornelia Frances as Cathy Wells
- Arthur Sherman as Andy Epstein
- Anne Haddy as Alice Wells
- Penne Hackforth-Jones as Heather Rogers
- Lisa Peers as Roslyn Rowney

== Episode list ==
No.	Title	Directed by	Written by	Original release date
1	TBA	Rod Hardy and Bruce Best	Reg Watson and Alan Coleman	14 February 1981 (MEL/BRIS), 20 February 1981 (SYD)
Male version of 'Prisoner' and starring Robert Coleby, Mike Preston and Barry Crocker. Includes an appearance by Mel Gibson in this episode.
2	TBA	Unknown	Unknown	16 February 1981 (BRIS), 21 February 1981 (MEL), 27 February 1981 (SYD)
3	TBA	Unknown	Unknown	21 February 1981 (BRIS), 28 February 1981 (MEL), 6 March 1981 (SYD)
Cast includes Anne Haddy, Terry Bader, Penne Hackforth-Jones, Julie McGregor, Jon Ewing, Kris McQuade
4	TBA	Unknown	Unknown	23 February 1981 (BRIS), 7 March 1981 (MEL), 13 March 1981 (SYD)
5	TBA	Unknown	Unknown	28 February 1981 (BRIS), 17 November 1981 (SYD), 15 December 1981 (MEL)
6	TBA	Unknown	Unknown	2 March 1981 (BRIS), 24 November 1981 (SYD), 22 December 1981 (MEL)
7	TBA	Unknown	Unknown	7 March 1981 (BRIS), 1 December 1981 (SYD), 29 December 1981 (MEL)
8	TBA	Unknown	Unknown	9 March 1981 (BRIS), 8 December 1981 (SYD), 5 January 1982 (MEL)
9	TBA	Unknown	Unknown	14 March 1981 (BRIS), 15 December 1981 (SYD), 12 January 1982 (MEL)
10	TBA	Unknown	Unknown	16 March 1981 (BRIS), 22 December 1981 (SYD), 19 January 1982 (MEL), 15 February 1982 (ADEL)
11	TBA	Unknown	Unknown	29 December 1981 (SYD), 26 January 1982 (MEL)
Actors appearing in this episode : Barry Crocker, Jon Ewing, Cornelia Frances, Ron Graham, Penne Hackforth-Jones, Julie McGregor, Mike Preston, Arthur Sherman, Michael Smith, George Spartels, James C Steele, Ross Thompson, Ken Wayne, Brian Wenzel, Penny Downie, Amanda Jane Trotter.
12	TBA	Unknown	Unknown	5 January 1982 (SYD), 2 February 1982 (MEL)
13	TBA	Unknown	Unknown	12 January 1982 (SYD), 9 February 1982 (MEL)
14	TBA	Unknown	Unknown	19 January 1982 (SYD)
15	TBA	Unknown	Unknown	26 January 1982 (SYD)
16	TBA	Unknown	Unknown	2 February 1982 (SYD)
17	TBA	Unknown	Unknown	23 February 1982 (SYD)
18	TBA	Unknown	Unknown	2 March 1982 (SYD)
19	TBA	Unknown	Unknown	9 March 1982 (SYD)
20	TBA	Unknown	Unknown	16 March 1982 (SYD)
21	TBA	Unknown	Unknown	23 March 1982 (SYD)
22	TBA	Unknown	Unknown	30 March 1982 (SYD)
23	TBA	Unknown	Unknown	6 April 1982 (SYD)
24	TBA	Unknown	Unknown	13 April 1982 (SYD)
25	TBA	Unknown	Unknown	20 April 1982 (SYD)
26	TBA	Unknown	Unknown	27 April 1982 (SYD)

== Reception ==
In 2020, Fiona Byrne of the Herald Sun included Punishment in her feature about "long forgotten Australian TV dramas that made viewers switch off." Byrne expressed surprise that the show was Gibson's next role after his appearance in Mad Max. She stated "Perhaps sensing that better options were available to him overseas, Gibson took off after the pilot episode, but the Punishment cast was still strong". She noted that Network Ten "lost faith in its grim, dark drama" so they launched it in a poor timeslot, leading it to be pulled after only three episodes.

== Home media ==
Title	Format	Episodes	Discs/Tapes	Region 4 (Australia)	Special features	Distributors
Punishment (Complete Series)	DVD	26	N/A	N/A	N/A	N/A

== Available at (National Film and Sound Archives) ==
Title	Episodes	NFSA Content	Available For Viewing
Punishment	26/26	Episodes 01–26 Documents x02	Episodes 1-17 (Episodes 1,5,11 & 12 Tape Format) Episodes 21-26 (Episodes 2–4,6-10,13-17,21-26 Digital Format)
