= Platypus Cove =

- Written by: Charles Stamp
- Directed by: Peter Maxwell
- Starring: Tony Barry; Allen Bickford; Simone Buchanan; Paul Smith; Carmen Duncan; Bill Kerr
- Country of origin: Australia
- Original language: English

Production
- Producer: Geof Gardiner
- Production company: Independent Productions

Original release
- Release: 1983

Platypus Cove is a 1983 Australian television film about a tugboat.

== Cast ==
- Tony Barry as Frank Nelson
- Carmen Duncan as Margaret Davis
- Simone Buchanan as Jenny Nelson
- Paul Smith as Jim Mason
- Martin Lewis as Peter Nelson
- Aileen Britton as Grandma Mason
- Henri Szeps as Winston Bell
- Mark Hembrow as Paddy O'Neil
- Dennis Miller as Sergeant Don Bailey
- Bill Kerr as Mr. Anderson
- Brian Anderson as Shop Manager
- Allen Bickford as Ted Finch
- Robin Bowering as Dr. Rinaldi
- Robert Carne as Boxing Second
- John Chedid as Michael Peters
- Tim Grogan as Boxing Second
- John Ley as Leo Baldwin
- Patrick Mansfield as Boat Seller
