= Dusty (film) =

- Directed by: John Richardson
- Written by: Sonia Borg
- Based on: novel by Frank Dalby Davison
- Produced by: Gil Brealey
- Starring: Bill Kerr
- Cinematography: Alex McPhee
- Edited by: David Greig
- Music by: Frank Strangio
- Distributed by: Umbrella Entertainment
- Release date: 1983
- Running time: 88 min
- Country: Australia
- Language: English
- Box office: A$710,000 (Australia)

Dusty is a 1983 Australian film about the friendship between a drover (Bill Kerr) and his part-dingo dog, Dusty.

Based on the popular novel by Frank Dalby Davison, it was shot on location in northern Victoria.

== Cast ==
- Bill Kerr as Tom Lincoln
- Noel Trevarthen as Harry Morrison
- Carol Burns as Clara Morrison
- John Stanton as Railey Jordan
- Nicholas Holland as Jack Morrison
- Dan Lynch as Ron Morrison
- Kati Edwards as Mrs Muspratt
- William Kerr as Jim Logan
- Ed Thurley as Fred Patterson
- May Howlett as Mrs Patterson
- Kim Trengove as Barmaid

== Reception ==
Writing in The Age, Neil Jillett said the film "succeeds artistically where the bombastic We of the Never-Never and The Man from Snowy River failed. Like The Getting of Wisdom, it brings a classic of our literature to the screen without sacrificing its spirit, without kowtowing to fashionable attitudes and without trying to ape Hollywood."

The Sydney Morning Herald's Anna Maria Dell'Oso gave it a mixed review and wrote: "Dusty is mostly, however, a good-hearted film, plainer than Phar Lap but with the same Aussie affection for a bush story." Susie Eisenhuth of The Sun-Herald gave it 2 stars, finishing: "Like any good animal film, Dusty checks in with a suitable plea for the wild and its creatures. But here again, as elsewhere, it isn't quite up to dishing it out with the sort of verve that might have made the whole film a lot more memorable."

Sandra Hall wrote in The Bulletin: "Dusty is directed by John Richardson with rather too much deliberation and too little humor. Nonetheless, it’s a modestly affecting film dignified by Kerr’s performance which is strong, understated and staunchly unsentimental. No crowd-pleasing compromises here."

The Canberra Times's Dougal MacDonald opines: "Dusty is not the greatest Australian film by any means, but it is strong, honest work that stands very much to the credit of its makers and deserves a look."

Reviewing for a 1985 TV broadcast John Hindle of The Age began: "I've always been impressed by Dusty. In fact, I think it's one of the finest films made in Australia." Jill Morris, also in The Age, notes: "John Richardson's direction sets a pace slow enough for us to empathise with the dilemmas of dog lovers who are first and foremost sheepmen; and with the confusions of Dusty himself. Yet there is sufficent (sic) suspense to hold young viewers."

Bill Kerr earned a nomination for the 1982 AFI Award for Best Actor for his role.

== Television series ==
Dusty
- Written by: Graeme Farmer; John Misto
- Directed by: Colin Budds
- Starring: John Heywood; Brenton Whittle; Kris McQuade; Asher Keddie; John Jarratt
- Countries of origin: Australia; France
- Original language: English
- No. of episodes: 6

Production
- Running time: 85 mins

Original release
- Release: 20 February 1989

The film led to a miniseries which cost $3 million.

=== Cast ===
- John Heywood
- Jessica Muschamp
- Brenton Whittle
- Kris McQuade
- Asher Keddie
- John Jarratt as Jacko
