= Allen Bickford =

Australian actor of film and TV

Allen Bickford is an Australian actor of film and TV. He has appeared in classic Australian TV series such as Matlock Police and Homicide as well as the British series Man at the Top.

In 1970, he appeared as Dan Kelly in the film Ned Kelly which starred Mick Jagger as Ned Kelly.

He appeared as the sinister hitman Collins in the award-winning 1981 film The Killing of Angel Street. His character was loosely based on the Sydney gangster Abe Saffron who was widely believed to be involved in the disappearance of the Sydney heiress and green activist Juanita Nielsen.

In 1983 he appeared in the TV film Platypus Cove.

In 1986 he appeared in an episode of The Flying Doctors.
