= Last Breakfast in Paradise =

1982 short film

- Directed by: Meg Stewart
- Written by: Meg Stewart
- Produced by: Richard Brennan
- Starring: Penne Hackforth-Jones; John Hargreaves
- Cinematography: David Sanderson
- Edited by: Henry Dangar
- Music by: Sharon Calcraft
- Release date: 1982
- Running time: 45 minutes
- Country: Australia
- Language: English
- Budget: $52,000

Last Breakfast in Paradise is a 1982 Australian short film created by Meg Stewart. It tell the story of the last period of a love affair. It was the first fiction film by Stewart who shot the film over two weeks. It won the Fiction award Greater Union Awards in 1982.

Anna-Maria Dell'oso, writing for the Sydney Morning Herald, called it "Short, sweet and scathing". She writes "Swift, witty and poignant, Last Breakfast In Paradise emerges as an intimate chamber piece against the big loud symphonies of the two-hour-plus feature films."

In 1985 it was showcased on The Cutting Room where the Age's Judith Fox called it "a densely-written, theatrically-structured film about the end of a relationship in which language is used to maintain emotional distance." Barbara Hooks of the Age writes "Meg Stewarts script is at once studied and throwaway, penetrating and obscure, wryly amusing and sad. Language is the couple's chosen weaponry. This is dialogue at 10 paces. An interesting, if rather theatrical, observation of a romance in ruins." Richard Coleman in the Sydney Morning Herald said it "was a boy-leaves-girl story enshrouded in a lot of bad dialogue" and that the best parts of the film was the performance of the lead actors.

== Cast ==
- Penne Hackforth-Jones as Angela Jones
- John Hargreaves as Stephen Smith
