= Kokoda Crescent =

- Directed by: Ted Robinson
- Written by: Patrick Cook
- Produced by: Phillip Emanuel
- Starring: Warren Mitchell; Bill Kerr; Martin Vaughan; Ruth Cracknell
- Cinematography: Dan Burstall
- Production companies: Phillip Emanuel Productions; Australian Film Commission
- Distributed by: Applause Home Video (video)
- Release date: 1988
- Country: Australia
- Language: English
- Budget: A$2 million

Kokoda Crescent is a 1988 Australian film about World War Two veterans who seek revenge against the drug pushers responsible for the death of one of their grandchildren.

== Cast ==
- Warren Mitchell as Stan
- Bill Kerr as Russ
- Martin Vaughan as Eric
- Ruth Cracknell as Alice
- Madge Ryan as Margaret
- Penne Hackforth-Jones as Carol
- John Orcsik as Vince
- Slim De Grey as Aub
- Greg Stone as Sergeant
- Steve Jacobs as Detective

== Music ==
The film's sound track features the opening chords of Erik Satie's Gymnopédie No. 1 repeated ad nauseam with no apparent connection to the action on the screen.

== Release ==
The movie was not released theatrically and went straight to video. A DVD transfer has been published in Australia.

== Review ==
"Good idea squanders an excellent cast by concentrating on the nastier sides of the story"
