= Farmhouse (group) =

Australian supergroup

- Origin: Australia
- Years active: c. 1991
- Labels: RCA; BMG
- Past members: Georgie Parker, Emily Symons, Julie McGregor, Chris Truswell, Michael Horrocks

Farmhouse was a short-lived Australian supergroup consisting of Georgie Parker (A Country Practice), Emily Symons (Home & Away), Julie McGregor and Chris Truswell (Hey Dad..!) and Michael Horrocks (Cartoon Connection). The group made a self-titled album consisting of ten cover songs.

== Discography ==
=== Albums ===
List of albums, with Australian chart positions
Title	Album details	Peak chart positions
Title	Album details	AUS
Farmhouse	Released: November 1991; Format: CD, Cassette; Label: RCA (VPCD 0845)	95

=== Singles ===
Year	Title	Chart positions	Album
Year	Title	AUS	Album
1991	"These Boots Are Made For Walking"	54	Farmhouse
1991	"Jet Airliner"	—	Farmhouse
