= Kris McQuade =

Australian actress

- Born: 1952 (age 73–74)
- Education: National Institute of Dramatic Art (1971)
- Occupation: Actor
- Known for: Deadloch; Rosehaven; Wentworth

Kris McQuade (born 1952) is an Australian stage, television and film actress who has had many film, television and theatre roles. McQuade is best known for her roles in Deadloch, Rosehaven and Wentworth.

== Early life ==
McQuade studied a Bachelor of Performing Arts at Sydney's National Institute of Dramatic Art (NIDA), graduating in 1971.

== Career ==
=== Television ===
From 1973, McQuade had early guest roles in Matlock Police, Division 4, Ryan and Homicide, before landing a regular ongoing role as Gail Bennet in ABC soap opera Bellbird in 1974. She went on to star as Christine Clayton in another soap opera, Certain Women from 1975 to 1976, before making further guest appearances in Alvin Purple, Bluey and Love Thy Neighbour in Australia.

McQuade's next television credit of note was Crawford Productions soap opera Skyways, in which she starred as Faye Peterson, partner of security chief, Peter Fanelli (played by Bill Stalker), from 1979 to 1980. Roles in several miniseries followed during the 1980s, including playing Kitty in ABC Depression-era period drama Palace of Dreams in 1985. The role won her a Penguin Award for Best Supporting Actress. She then played Mum / Elsie in the three installments of historical saga Fields of Fire from 1987 to 1989. She also appeared as Shirley in the 1991 biographical miniseries Rose Against the Odds, telling the story of Australian Indigenous boxer Lionel Rose.

From 1991 to 1992, McQuade's next significant credit was Boys from the Bush, in which she played the role of Delilah, before playing the first of two recurring roles, 'Loony Laura' Brennan, a retired professional runner, in long-running soap opera Home and Away in 1993. She played Gillian in sci-fi series Return to Jupiter in 1997. She had a second recurring role on Home and Away in 2005, this time as Noelene, mother of Dan and Peter Baker. She then went on to play the lead role of Professor Pip Cartwright in comedy series Supernova from 2005 to 2006.

McQuade joined the main cast for prison drama series Wentworth in late 2012, as crime matriarch and prison top dog Jacqueline 'Jacs' Holt. She featured in the entire first season of the show, before the character was killed during the finale. Her portrayal earned her a nomination for the AACTA Award for Best Guest or Supporting Actress in a Television Drama in 2013. The following year, as part of the ensemble cast, she was nominated for an Equity Ensemble Award.

McQuade portrayed underworld matriarch Kath Pettingill in the award-winning 2011 drama series Killing Time, based on the true story of disgraced lawyer Andrew Fraser. She played Dr Fiona McKenzie in 2016 miniseries The Kettering Incident and from 2016, she also featured in the cast of comedy series Rosehaven, alongside Celia Pacquola and Luke McGregor, playing the role of Barbara for the show's entire run.

In 2023, McQuade appeared in black comedy crime series Deadloch. That same year, she was announced as part of the cast for the second season of The Twelve, opposite Sam Neill and Brendan Cowell. On 20 November 2025, McQuade was announced to appear in upcoming ABC drama series Treasure & Dirt.

McQuade's other television credits include episodes of Punishment (1981), Scales of Justice (1983), A Country Practice, The Flying Doctors, The Last Resort (1988), Wildside, Grass Roots, Blue Heelers, and Stingers.

=== Film ===
McQuade's early film roles include 1973 Ozploitation sex-comedy classic Alvin Purple, in which she played Samantha alongside Graeme Blundell and a young Jacki Weaver. The following year, she appeared in the film's sequel, Alvin Rides Again. She also appeared in 1977 short film The Love Letters from Teralba Road, playing estranged wife Barbara opposite Bryan Brown.

Appearances in two of her early films, as Mrs Goodwood in Fighting Back (1982) and as Stella in Buddies (1983), saw McQuade nominated for Australian Film Industry Awards for Best Supporting and Best Actress respectively, scoring a win for Fighting Back.

In 1985, McQuade appeared in romantic comedy feature The Coca-Cola Kid, playing the role of Juliana, opposite American actor Eric Roberts and Greta Scacchi. The following year, she acted in Jane Campion's directorial film debut Two Friends, earning an AFI Award nomination for Best Actress. She then had a role in Baz Luhrmann's first feature film, the romantic comedy Strictly Ballroom in 1992, playing Charm Leachman, opposite Paul Mercurio and Barry Otto.

McQuade was recognised with further AFI Award nominations for her roles in 1993 drama film Broken Highway starring Aden Young and 2000 romantic comedy Better Than Sex, in which she appeared opposite David Wenham and Susie Porter.

McQuade played Gwen Maloney in 2001 David Caesar film Mullet, appearing alongside Ben Mendelsohn. She then had a role as family matriarch, Ellen Kelly in Gregor Jordan's 2003 historic drama Ned Kelly, a retelling of the story of Australia's famed bushranger of the same name, with Heath Ledger and Orlando Bloom. She played Mrs McAnsh in 2007 Australian drama film December Boys, starring Daniel Radcliffe.

More recently, McQuade has appeared in the 2017 post-apocalyptic thriller Cargo, in which she appeared with British actor Martin Freeman as the character of Etta. She also had a supporting role in martial arts fantasy film Mortal Kombat (2021).

Further film credits throughout McQuade's career include Kostas (1978), Harvest of Hate (1979), Lonely Hearts (1982), Goodbye Paradise (1983), Billy's Holiday (1995), Subdivision (2009) and Holding the Man (2015).

=== Theatre ===
McQuade has also appeared in numerous theatre productions, beginning with The Beggar's Opera with NIDA in 1971. The following year, she played Jan in a production of the musical Grease at Melbourne's Metro Theatre for Harry M. Miller. In 1977, playing the role of Natasha in an Old Tote Theatre Company production of The Lower Depths at the Sydney Opera House won McQuade a National Theatre Critics Award.

From 1998 to 2001, McQuade toured Australia and then London and New York with a stage adaptation of Tim Winton's Cloudstreet. Her role as Dolly Pickles earned her a 2002 Helpmann Awards nomination for Best Actress.

2010 saw McQuade nominated for a Sydney Theatre Critics Award for Best Supporting Actress for her role as Gabrielle York in a STC touring production of When the Rain Stops Falling. Then in 2012, she was nominated for a Helpmann Award for Best Supporting Actress, for a MTC production of Neighbourhood Watch. The role also saw her nominated for a Sydney Theatre Critics Award.

In 2013, McQuade played the titular role in Maggie Stone, for State Theatre Company of South Australia. She returned to Adelaide in 2015, to lead the cast in the world premiere season of The Aspirations of Daise Morrow, adapted from a short story by Australian playwright, Patrick White.

== Filmography ==
=== Film ===
Year	Title	Role	Notes	Ref.
1973	Come Out Fighting	Sporting World Hostess	Short film	
1973	Alvin Purple	Samantha		
1974	Alvin Rides Again	Mandy		
1975	The Firm Man	Anne Thropomorphic		
1975	The True Story of Eskimo Nell	Lil		
1977	The Love Letters from Teralba Road	Barbara	Short film	
1978	Harvest of Hate	Ruth Grant	TV film	
1979	Kostas	Jenny		
1982	And/Or = One	Samantha		
1982	Lonely Hearts	Rosemarie		
1982	Fighting Back	Mrs. Goodwood		
1983	Now and Forever	Matilda Spencer		
1983	Buddies	Stella		
1983	Goodbye Paradise	Hooker		
1985	The Coca-Cola Kid	Juliana		
1985	Stock Squad	Caroline Marshall	TV film	
1985	Remember Me	Sue	TV film	
1986	Two Friends	Janet, Louise's mother	TV film	
1987	The Surfer	Trish		
1992	Strictly Ballroom	Charm Leachman		
1992	Resistance	Ruth		
1993	Broken Highway	Woman		
1995	Billy's Holiday	Kate Hammond		
1996	McLeod's Daughters	Meg	TV film	
2000	Better Than Sex	Taxi Driver		
2001	Mullet	Gwen Maloney		
2003	Ned Kelly	Ellen Kelly		
2003	Preservation	Mrs. Harrison		
2005	Hell Has Harbour Views	Pam	TV film	
2007	December Boys	Mrs. McAnsh		
2008	Not Quite Hollywood: The Wild, Untold Story of Ozploitation!	Herself	Documentary film	
2009	Subdivision	Betty Kelly		
2015	Holding the Man	Aunt Mary		
2017	Cargo	Etta		
2021	Mortal Kombat	Cargo Plane Pilot		
2025	Modern Folklore	Girl Scout Mom		

=== Television ===
Year	Title	Role	Notes	Ref
1973, 1974	Matlock Police	Terri Williams / Carol Green	2 episodes	
1973–1974	Division 4	Various roles	4 episodes	
1974	Ryan	Abby Simpson	Episode: "A Deep Dark Place"	
1974	Homicide	Sonia / Mary Turner	2 episodes	
1974	Bellbird	Gail Bennet	173 episodes	
1975	Wollongong the Brave	Karen Vaughn / Tracey	Episode: "Gunston: The Golden Weeks"	
1975–1976	Certain Women	Christine Clayton	11 episodes	
1976	Alvin Purple	Elsie	Episode: "The Postman"	
1976	Bluey	Judy Browning	Episode 35: "Whole of Life"	
1979	Love Thy Neighbour in Australia	Liz	Episode: "Who's a Naughty Boy?"	
1979–1980	Skyways	Faye Peterson	74 episodes	
1980	The Sullivans	Lt. Phillipa Heath	2 episodes	
1982	A Country Practice	Trudi	2 episodes	
1983	Scales of Justice	Kate Hardman	Episode: "The Numbers"	
1985	Palace of Dreams	Kitty	Miniseries, 4 episodes	
1986	The Fast Lane	Zola	Episode: "Murder Most Fouled"	
1987	Fields of Fire	Mum	Miniseries, 2 episodes	
1987	Rafferty's Rules	Pamela Gordon	Episode: "Public Image"	
1988	The Last Resort			
1988	Dusty		Miniseries	
1988	Fields of Fire II	Elsie	Miniseries, 2 episodes	
1989	Fields of Fire III	Elsie	Miniseries, 2 episodes	
1990	The Flying Doctors	Caz	Episode: "Dad's Little Bloke"	
1991	Rose Against the Odds	Shirley Rennie	Miniseries	
1991–1992	Boys from the Bush	Delilah	16 episodes	
1993–2005	Home and Away	Laura Brennan / Noelene Baker	20 episodes	
1994	G.P.	Julia Priestley	Episode: "That Old Black Magic"	
1994	A Country Practice	Helen Ross	Episode: "Running Wild"	
1995	Blue Heelers	Maureen Powers	Episode: "Protected Species"	
1996	Police Rescue	Alison Johnson	Episode: "Nobody's Place"	
1996	House Gang	Raelene	Episode: "Winners"	
1997	Fallen Angels	Jude	Episode: "All Things Bright and Beautiful"	
1997	Return to Jupiter	Gillian	13 episodes	
1998	Medivac	Carmel	Episode: "Denial"	
1999	Wildside	Elizabeth Holland	Episode #2.20	
2000	Grass Roots	Cheryl Da Costa	Episode: "October to March"	
2001	The Farm	Pat McCormick	3 episodes	
2002	Stingers	Dossie Logan	Episode: "Old Scores"	
2003	Snobs	Mrs. Lewis	Episode #1.20	
2005–2006	Supernova	Professor Pip Cartwright	12 episodes	
2007	All Saints	Dorothea Louden	Episode: "Cutting Free"	
2009	My Place	Grandma / Bev's Friend	2 episodes	
2009	The Circuit	Terri Oliver	2 episodes	
2011	Killing Time	Kath Pettingill	6 episodes	
2011–2012	Packed to the Rafters	Brenda Fraser	3 episodes	
2013	A Place to Call Home	Grace Stevens	2 episodes	
2013	Wentworth	Jacs Holt	10 episodes	
2016	The Kettering Incident	Dr. Fiona McKenzie	6 episodes	
2016–2021	Rosehaven	Barbara McCallum	39 episodes	
2018	Mystery Road	Liz Rutherford	3 episodes	
2019	Glitch	Dawn	Episode: "Mum"	
2020	The Gloaming	Detective Snr Carrie Bennett	3 episodes	
2021	The Tailings	Laurie	6 episodes	
2023	Deadloch	Victoria O'Dwyer	8 episodes	
2024	The Twelve	Bernice Price	7 episodes	
2025	Bay of Fires	Barry	Episode: "The Chosen"	
2026	Treasure & Dirt	TBA	TBA	

== Theatre ==
Year	Title	Role	Notes	Ref
1971	The Beggar's Opera	Mrs Coaxer	UNSW Old Tote Theatre, Sydney with NIDA	
1971	Women Beware Women	Livia	UNSW Old Tote Theatre, Sydney with NIDA	
1971	Peer Gynt	Boy / Herd girl	UNSW Old Tote Theatre, Sydney with NIDA	
1971	The Balcony	Thief	UNSW Old Tote Theatre, Sydney with NIDA	
1971	Under Milk Wood		NIDA Theatre, Sydney	
1972	OddOdyssey		Schonell Theatre, Brisbane with Nova Terra Astra	
1972	Grease	Jan	Metro Theatre, Melbourne with Harry M. Miller	
1974	Muriel		Jane St Theatre, Sydney with NIDA	
1975	Mariner		Jane St Theatre, Sydney with NIDA	
1975	Interplay		Jane St Theatre, Sydney with NIDA	
1975	Bérénice		Sydney Opera House with Old Tote Theatre	
1976	Hero		Seymour Centre, Sydney with Australian Opera	
1976	The Duchess of Malfi	Julia	Nimrod, Sydney	
1977	Fifth Australian National Playwrights' Conference		Canberra	
1977	The Lower Depths	Natasha	Sydney Opera House with Old Tote Theatre	
1978	Rock-Ola		Nimrod, Sydney, University of Adelaide	
1980	The Oresteia	Kassandra / Trojan Slave / Fury	Nimrod, Sydney	
1980–1981	Catch a Rising Star		Melbourne Theatre Restaurant	
1982	The Butterflies of Kalimantan	Sal	Stables Theatre, Sydney with STC	
1983	Mission Molly Morgan		Playhouse, Newcastle with Hunter Valley Theatre Co (also Devisor)	
1984	1984 A.D.		Arts Theatre, Adelaide	
1984	King Lear	Regan	Bankstown District Sports Club, York Theatre, Sydney with Nimrod	
1992	The Rain Dancers		Wharf Theatre, Sydney with STC	
1994	Big Toys		Marian St Theatre, Sydney	
1998	Mourning Becomes Electra	Christine Mannon	Wharf Theatre, Sydney with STC	
1998–2001	Cloudstreet	Dolly Pickles / Alma	Australian tour, National Theatre, London, Harvey Lichtenstein Theater, New York with Company B, Black Swan Theatre Co & QTC	
2000	A Cheery Soul	Ronald Falk Matron / Mrs. Pinfold / Mr. Furze	Sydney Opera House with STC & Company B	
2002	Wicked Sisters		Stables Theatre, Sydney with Griffin Theatre Co	
2003	The One Day of the Year	Dot Maloney	Australian tour	
2003	The Threepenny Opera	Celia Peachum	Belvoir, Sydney	
2004	Our Lady of Sligo	Mai O'Hara	Belvoir, Sydney	
2004–2005	Parramatta Girls		Belvoir, Sydney	
2005–2006	The Odyssey	The Storyteller	Malthouse Theatre, Melbourne, Silver Jubilee Pavilion, Perth with Black Swan Theatre Co	
2007	The Adventures of Snugglepot and Cuddlepie and Little Ragged Blossom	Mrs Snake	Australian tour with Company B & STCSA	
2008–2010	When the Rain Stops Falling	Gabrielle York (50)	Australian tour with STC & Brink Productions	
2010	Love Me Tender	Ensemble	Perth Cultural Centre, Belvoir, Sydney with Griffin Theatre Co	
2011; 2014	Neighbourhood Watch	Milova / Milinka	Belvoir, Sydney, Southbank Theatre, Melbourne with MTC	
2012	Strange Interlude	Mrs Evans	Belvoir, Sydney	
2013	Maggie Stone	Maggie Stone	Space Theatre, Adelaide with STCSA	
2015	The Aspirations of Daise Morrow	Mrs Whalley / Counsellor Hogben	Space Theatre, Adelaide with Brink Productions	
2018	The Sugar House	June Macreadie	Belvoir, Sydney	
2018	Darlinghurst Nights		Sydney Theatre Company	
2020	King Ubu	Ma Ubu (voice)	Cataract Gorge, Launceston with Terrapin Puppet Theatre for MONA FOMA	
	The Mask of the Red Death	Narrator	Archipelago Productions	

== Awards ==
Year	Work	Award	Category	Result	Ref
1978	The Lower Depths	National Theatre Critics Award		Won	
1982	Fighting Back	Australian Film Industry Awards	Best Supporting Actress	Won	
1983	Buddies	Australian Film Industry Awards	Best Actress	Nominated	
1985	Palace of Dreams	Penguin Awards	Best Supporting Actress	Won	
1986	Two Friends	Australian Film Industry Awards	Best Actress in a TV movie	Nominated	
1993	Broken Highway	Australian Film Industry Awards	Best Supporting Actress	Nominated	
2000	Better Than Sex	Australian Film Industry Awards	Best Supporting Actress	Nominated	
2002	Cloudstreet	Helpmann Awards	Best Actress	Nominated	
2006	Super Nova	Australian Film Industry Awards	Best TV Comedy Performance	Nominated	
2010	When the Rain Stops Falling	Sydney Theatre Critics Awards	Best Supporting Actress	Nominated	
2012	Neighbourhood Watch	Sydney Theatre Critics Awards	Best Supporting Actress	Nominated	
2012	Neighbourhood Watch	Helpmann Awards	Best Supporting Actress	Nominated	
2013	Wentworth	AACTA Awards	Best Guest or Supporting Actress in a TV Drama	Nominated	
2014	Wentworth	Equity Ensemble Awards	Most Outstanding Performance By an Ensemble in a Drama Series	Nominated	
2017	The Kettering Incident	Equity Ensemble Awards	Most Outstanding Performance by an Ensemble in a Miniseries or Telemovie	Nominated	
2017	Rosehaven	Equity Ensemble Awards	Most Outstanding Performance by an Ensemble in a Comedy Series	Nominated	
2019	Mystery Road	Equity Ensemble Awards	Most Outstanding Performance by an Ensemble in a Drama Series	Won	
2024	Deadloch (Season 1)	Equity Ensemble Awards			
