= The Private War of Lucinda Smith =

- Written by: Peter Yeldham
- Directed by: Ray Alchin
- Starring: Nigel Havers; Linda Cropper; Werner Stocker; Andrew Clarke; Bill Kerr; Paul Smith
- Country of origin: Australia
- Original language: English
- No. of episodes: 2 x 2 hours

Production
- Producers: Ray Alchin; Geoffrey Daniels

Original release
- Network: Nine Network
- Release: 20 March 1991

The Private War of Lucinda Smith is a 1990 Australian mini series about an Australian chorus girl living in London.

== Cast ==
- Nigel Havers as Edward
- Linda Cropper as Lucinda Smith
- Werner Stocker as Hans
- Andrew Clarke as Lieutenant Andrews
- Anne Haddy as Mrs Spencer Grant
- Bill Kerr
- Paul Smith
