= The Fire in the Stone =

1984 Australian television film

- Based on: The Fire in the Stone by Colin Thiele
- Written by: Graeme Koetsveld
- Directed by: Gary Conway
- Starring: Alan Cassell; Paul Smith; Ray Meagher; Linda Hartley
- Music by: Brian Beamish; Peter Benson; Anita Hardman; Garry Hardman
- Country of origin: Australia
- Original language: English

Production
- Cinematography: Ross Berryman
- Editor: Philip Reid
- Running time: 94 minutes
- Production companies: South Australian Film Corporation; Australian Children's Television Foundation

Original release
- Release: 4 May 1985

The Fire in the Stone is a 1984 Australian made for television drama about teenagers in the town of Coober Pedy. It is based on the 1973 novel of the same name by Colin Thiele.

== Plot ==
When his precious cache of opals is stolen, 14-year-old Ernie, who lives with his alcoholic father in the harsh and lawless opal fields of inland Australia, sets out with a friend determined to find the thief.

== Cast ==
- Alan Cassell as Robbie
- Paul Smith as Ernie Ryan
- Ray Meagher as Dosh
- Linda Hartley as Sophie Andropoulos
- Leo Taylor as Borgan
- Andrew Gaston as Willie
- Theo Pertsinidis as Nick Andropoulos
- John Dick as Dingo
- Henry Salter as Davo
- George Katsibiris as Stan Andropoulos
- Alexandra Black as Mrs. Andropoulos
- Don Barker as Harry
- Ray Wheeler as Herb Henderson
- Kathryn Fisher as Nurse (as Katherine Fisher)
- Jon Firman as Brian Powell
- Peter Healy as Constable
- Anne Demidowicz as Jana Odinsky
- Raymond Jurgens as Kurt Odinsky
- Mladen Mladenov as Lech Odinsky
- Chris Sperou as Herman
- Zeta Boland as Aunt Marna
- Lorna Hudson as Willie's Mum
- Robert Gusenza as Storekeeper
- Rosina Coppola as Storekeeper's Wife
