= Rhinestone Rex and Miss Monica =

Play by David Williamson

- Original language: English
- Written by: David Williamson

Premiere
- Date: 2010

Rhinestone Rex and Miss Monica is a 2010 play by David Williamson about a romance between two middle aged people.
