= Bill Kerr =

British and Australian actor, comedian, and vaudevillian (1922–2014)

- Born: William Henry Kerr; 10 June 1922; Cape Town, Cape Province, South Africa
- Died: 28 August 2014 (aged 92); Perth, Western Australia, Australia
- Occupations: Actor (radio, stage, television and film); comedian; vaudevillian
- Years active: 1933–2011
- Children: 4

William Henry Kerr (10 June 1922 – 28 August 2014) was a British and Australian actor, comedian and vaudevillian. He was nicknamed "the lad from Wagga Wagga", and his name is inscribed in the town's Walk of Honour.

Born in South Africa, he started his career as a child actor in Australia, before emigrating to Britain after the Second World War, where he developed a career as a performer in comedy, especially gaining notice in the radio version of Hancock's Half Hour. In 1979 Kerr returned to Australia and developed a second career as a character actor.

== Early life ==
Kerr was born on 10 June 1922, in Cape Town, to an Australian performing arts family, including mother Anne Roberts, while they were on tour in South Africa. His introduction to show business was as a baby in his mother’s arms for the rest of the tour, when upon returning to the stage a few weeks after giving birth, Kerr's mother began using him as a stand-in for a 'prop' doll. Kerr's grandfather was Professor Roberts, who ran a Dancing Academy in both Sydney and Melbourne.

From there, Kerr's family relocated to Wagga Wagga, in regional New South Wales, Australia. where his mother ensured he worked on his elocution, which paved the way for his acting career, beginning with youth roles in radio. He also performed in local musical theatre, revues and eisteddfods.

== Career ==
=== Early career ===
Kerr began to work in radio for ABC in 1932, and continued performing child parts for about eight years.

His first screen appearance was in Harmony Row (1933), where he gave a feisty performance as a juvenile delinquent alongside Australian vaudeville comedian George Wallace. He appeared alongside Wallace once more in the successful film His Royal Highness.

Kerr's first major role on screen came in 1934, with the Cinesound drama The Silence of Dean Maitland, where he played the part of a blind child.

In his teens, Kerr worked at 2WG in Wagga Wagga as a radio announcer from 1939 to 1941.

Kerr served in the Australian army during the Second World War, alongside his friend, actor Peter Finch. While serving, he performed in theatrical shows in both Australia and abroad overseas.

=== Career in Britain ===
At the end of the war, a newly married Kerr relocated to Britain in 1947, with his wife Margaret, to make his name overseas. The pair only had enough money for one ticket, so Kerr worked as a steward on the boat trip over.

During the next few years he was regularly featured in the BBC radio series Variety Bandbox, part of the BBC Light Programme. Retaining his accent, an unusual choice for performers moving to Britain at this time, he was billed as "the boy from Wagga Wagga." A spokesman for the Australian town's museum said that this "struck an instant chord with the post-war British audience, who thought of 'Wagga Wagga' as a comically surreal, end of the earth, magical place somewhere left of Narnia." Harry Secombe described Kerr as having a "very laconic act" on the show, beginning his spots with the catchphrase "I'm only here for four minutes." In 1952, Kerr embarked on a six week concert tour of Korea.

From 1954 to 1959, Kerr had a regular role as an Australian lodger in the BBC radio comedy series Hancock's Half Hour. The series, with comedian Tony Hancock as the eponymous lead and also featuring Sid James, ran for six series. Initially sharper than Hancock's characterisation, Kerr's portrayal eventually developed into a more dim-witted character who became the butt of Hancock's jokes. When Hancock moved to television, Kerr did not feature in the subsequent television version of the series.

During his tenure on Hancock's Half Hour, Kerr appeared in 1955 war film The Dam Busters, playing real life bomber pilot Micky Martin.

Kerr also had much theatrical success in Britain, appearing in a touring production of the play The Teahouse of the August Moon in 1956. He next played the Devil disguised as Mr Applegate in the first West End production of Damn Yankees, directed by Bob Fosse and first performed in March 1957.

From 1958 to 1963, Kerr starred in the radio drama series The Flying Doctor, his character regularly flying in and out of the fictitious Wollumboola base, as he and his 'doctor' colleague brought reprobates to justice in the outback. Later, after Sid James had ended his professional partnership with Hancock, Kerr briefly resumed working with him in the first season of the television comedy series Citizen James (1960). He also appeared in 1963 British film The Wrong Arm of the Law.

Kerr also worked with Spike Milligan, appearing in Milligan and John Antrobus's stage play The Bed-Sitting Room, which opened at the Mermaid Theatre on 31 January 1963. A subsequent production opened on 3 May 1967 at the Saville Theatre, with "a cast containing an unusually high proportion of Australian actors including Kerr and David Nettheim." In the 1969 London production of Play It Again, Sam at the Globe Theatre, Kerr played Humphrey Bogart.

Kerr's made further television appearances with a featured role in the 1968 Doctor Who serial The Enemy of the World, with Patrick Troughton and a long-running role in the early 1960s BBC-TV soap, Compact.

In 1972, Kerr co-starred with Anthony Newley in the Newley/Bricusse musical, The Good Old Bad Old Days, which enjoyed a run lasting 309 performances. He also had a role (with Julia McKenzie and Una Stubbs) in the musical play Cole, dedicated to the work of Cole Porter and first staged at the Mermaid Theatre, London in July 1974.

Kerr took the part of Bluey Notts, described as "an Australian bookie's clerk, a crude racialist", in The Melting Pot (1975). This was a sitcom written by Spike Milligan and Neil Shand, which was cancelled by the BBC after just one episode had been broadcast.

=== Return to Australia ===
In 1979, after three decades of working in the UK, Kerr returned to Australia and settled in Perth, Western Australia, where his son William lived.

Kerr appeared in a recurring capacity on television series Glenview High in 1979. He then played the part of Douglas Kennedy in the soap opera The Young Doctors in 1980, before choosing to focus on versatile character roles. He played serious parts in Australian drama films, including Peter Weir's films Gallipoli (1981) and The Year of Living Dangerously (1982), both alongside Mel Gibson. He also appeared in comedy films with 1982 musical The Pirate Movie and 1985 film The Coca-Cola Kid. Additionally, he was seen as Dave Welles in the Australian miniseries Return to Eden (1983), a role he reprised in the 1985 full series of the same name.

Kerr's dramatic roles also continued, with turns as General John Monash in 1985 miniseries Anzacs, General Harry Chauvel in 1986 film The Lighthorsemen and a role in Kokoda Crescent (1989). He appeared in several other miniseries including 1915 (1982), The Heroes (1989), The Private War of Lucinda Smith (1991) and The River Kings (1991).

Kerr also worked on the Australian stage, in musicals such as My Fair Lady, where he received excellent reviews as Alfred Doolittle.

Kerr later had a recurring television role in comedy series Minty (1998). He also appeared in 2001 comedy film Let's Get Skase, miniseries Changi (2001) and The Shark Net (2003) and comedy adventure film Peter Pan (2003) opposite Jason Isaacs.

Additionally, he provided the narration for several documentaries including No Survivor – The Mysterious Loss of HMAS Sydney (1995) for the Nine Network, Malice or Mutiny (2003) for the ABC, and a series for Discovery, released in the US as Animal X (originally Animal X Natural Mystery Unit).

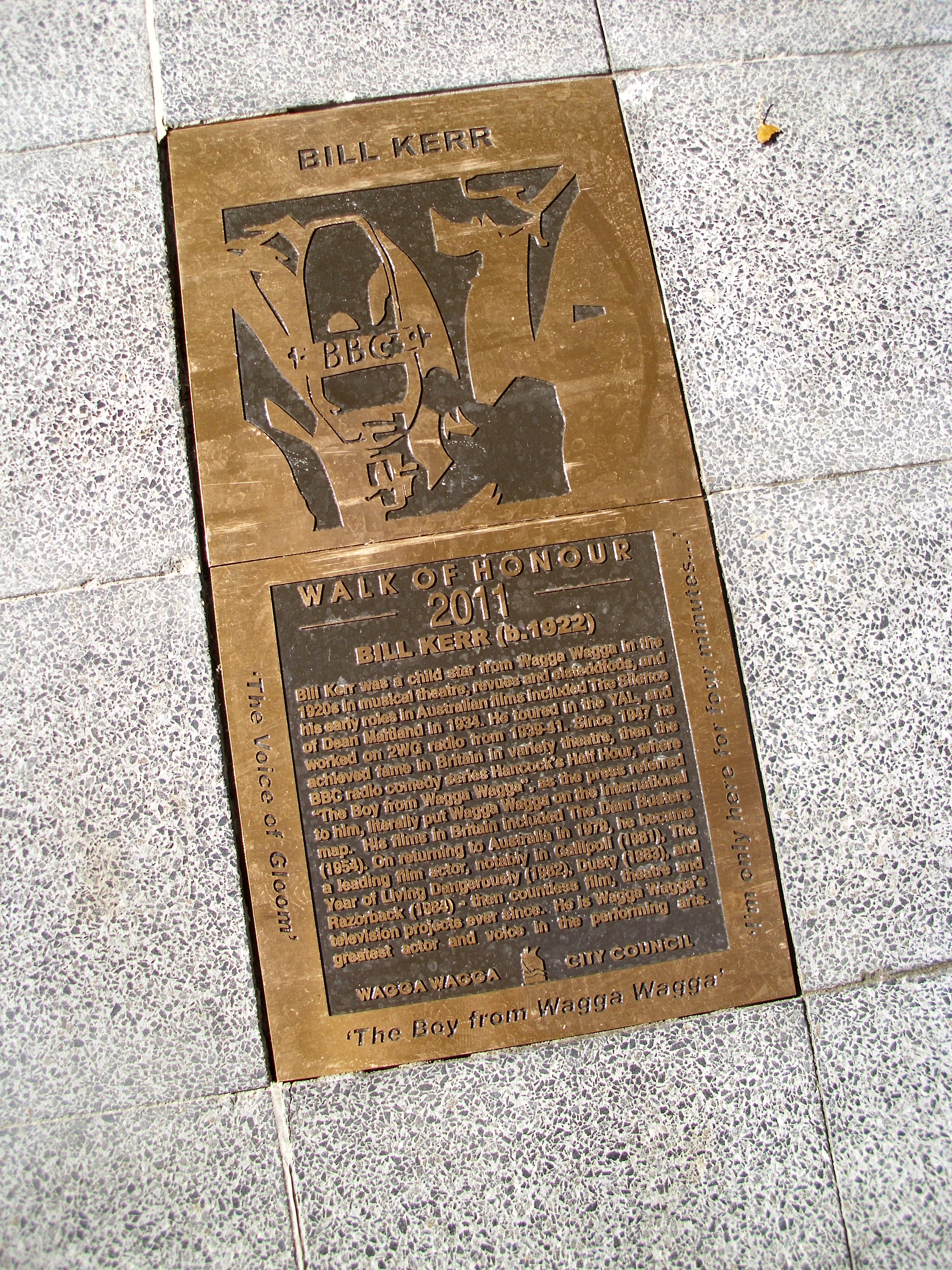
Walk of Honour plaque

On 26 January 2011, Kerr received the 2011 Walk of Honour in Wagga Wagga, which was unveiled on 17 May 2011.

== Personal life and death ==
During time in Western Australia, Kerr met English teacher Margaret Weaver whom he married at St George's Cathedral. It was the first of his three marriages.

He had four children: William, Peter, Wilton and Anne. The last two were born late in Kerr's life, to his third wife, Sandra.

Kerr died in his family home in Perth, Western Australia, on 28 August 2014 at the age of 92.

== Filmography ==
=== Film ===
Year	Title	Role	Notes	Ref.
1933	Harmony Row	Leonard aka Sonny		
1934	The Silence of Dean Maitland	Cyril Maitland Jr.		
1951	Penny Points to Paradise	Digger Graves		
1952	My Death Is a Mockery	Hansen		
1952	Appointment in London	Bill Brown		
1954	You Know What Sailors Are	Lieutenant Smart		
1955	The Night My Number Came Up	The Soldier		
1955	The Dam Busters	Flight Lieutenant H. B. Martin, D.S.O., D.F.C., A.F.C.		
1956	Port of Escape	Dinty Missouri		
1957	The Shiralee	Shopkeeper (uncredited)		
1959	The Captain's Table	Bill Coke		
1962	A Pair of Briefs	Victor – Club Owner		
1963	The Wrong Arm of the Law	Jack Coombes		
1963	Doctor in Distress	Australian Sailor		
1966	Doctor in Clover	Digger		
1966	A Funny Thing Happened on the Way to the Forum	Gladiator-in-Training		
1973	Tiffany Jones	Morton		
1973	Ghost in the Noonday Sun	Giacomo		
1975	Girls Come First aka Just One More Time	Hugh Jampton		
1976	House of Mortal Sin	Mr. Davey		
1981	Gallipoli	Jack		
1982	Save the Lady	MacDuff		
1982	The Pirate Movie	Major General Stanley		
1982	Tracks of the Rainbow	Narrator		
1982	The Year of Living Dangerously	Colonel Henderson		
1983	Dusty	Tom Lincoln		
1984	Razorback	Jake Cullen		
1984	Vigil	Birdie		
1984	The Settlement	Kearney		
1984	The Narcissus Factor	Hilbert	Direct-to-video movie	
1985	Relatives	Grandpa		
1985	The Coca-Cola Kid	T. George McDowell		
1987	The Lighthorsemen	General Sir Harry Chauvel		
1987	Running from the Guns	Gilman		
1987	Bushfire Moon	Trevor Watson	Direct-to-video film	
1987	Rob Roy	Voice	Direct-to-video animated film	
1991	Sweet Talker	'Uncle' Cec		
1992	Over the Hill	Maurice		
2001	Let's Get Skase	Mitchell Vendieks		
2003	Peter Pan	Fairy Guide		
2004	Southern Cross	Tom Casely		

=== Television ===
Year	Title	Role	Notes	Ref.
1955	Garrison Theatre	Presenter	1 episode	
1958; 1959	ITV Television Playhouse		2 episodes	
1959	The Flying Doctor	Ted Mason	1 episode	
1960	Boyd Q.C.	Lewis Gorman	1 episode	
1960	Christmas Night with the Stars	Bill	1 episode	
1960	Citizen James	Bill	Season 1, 6 episodes	
1961	Spike Milligan: A Series of Unrelated Incidents at Current Market Value	Various roles	TV movie	
1961	Ghost Squad	Wacker Dawson	1 episode	
1962	Sykes and a...		1 episode	
1962	No Hiding Place	Hosking	1 episode	
1962	Garry Halliday	Eddie Robbins	17 episodes	
1963	Benny Hill	Lester	1 episode	
1963	Armchair Theatre	McKinney	1 episode	
1963–1965	Compact	Ben Bishop	156 episodes	
1963; 1975	Comedy Playhouse	Bluey Notts / First Customs Officer	2 episodes	
1964	Miss Adventure	Max Parrish	2 episodes	
1965	It's Not Me: It's Them!	Len	1 episode	
1965	Chicago in the Roaring 20's	Johnny Torrio / Augie	TV movie	
1967	Adam Adamant Lives!	Inspector Foster	1 episode	
1967–1968	Doctor Who	Giles Kent	Serial: The Enemy of the World, 6 episodes	
1969	Crossroads	Henry Plum	4 episodes	
1972	Dixon of Dock Green	Stan Pritchard	1 episode	
1974	2nd House	Actor in Cole	1 episode	
1976	The Melting Pot	Bluey Notts	6 episodes	
1977–1979	Glenview High	Harry Carter	39 episodes	
1978	Father, Dear Father in Australia	Customs Man	1 episode	
1978	Run from the Morning	Morrie Nelson	5 episodes	
1980	The Young Doctors	Douglas Kennedy	2 episodes	
1981	Falcon Island	Madden	143 episodes	
1981	Trial By Marriage	Sir Edmund King	1 episode	
1982	..'Deadline...	William Ashby	TV movie	
1982	M.P.S.I.B.	Levine	1 episode	
1983	Great Expectations	Voice	Animated TV movie	
1983	Platypus Cove	Mr. Anderson	TV movie	
1983	Return to Eden	Dave Welles	Miniseries, 1 episode	
1984	White Man's Legend	Mac	TV movie	
1985	Anzacs	General Monash	Miniseries, 2 episodes	
1985	A Fortunate Life	Narrator	Miniseries, 4 episodes	
1986	Return to Eden	Dave Welles	2 episodes	
1986	Sons and Daughters	Jeff Dalton	1 episode	
1986	Double Sculls	Cirly Pilsudki	TV movie	
1987	Flight of Diamonds	Narrator	TV special	
1988	Australians	Gordon Bennett	Miniseries, 1 episode	
1989	The Heroes	Paddy McDowell	Miniseries, 2 episodes	
1989	Kokoda Crescent	Russ	TV movie	
1990–1992	The New Adventures of Black Beauty	Samuel Burton	25 episodes	
1991	The Private War of Lucinda Smith	Scotty	TV movie	
1991	The River Kings	Captain Elijah	Miniseries, 4 episodes	
1993	Snowy	Stuart McLachlan	13 episodes	
1993	Clowning Around 2	Max	TV movie	
1993–1996	Ship to Shore	Horace Brinkmann	25 episodes	
1995	No Survivors – The Mysterious Loss of HMAS Sydney			
1995	The Celluloid Heroes	Self	Miniseries	
1998	Minty	Willie Courtenay / Old Thane	11 episodes	
2000	Funny by George: The George Wallace Story	Narrator	TV movie	
2001	Changi	Older Eddie	Miniseries, 2 episodes	
2003	The Shark Net	Mr Coleman	Miniseries, 1 episode	
2003	Malice or Mutiny: The Koolama Incident		Documentary	
2004–2006	Animal X Natural Mystery Unit		Documentary series	

== Theatre ==
Year	Title	Role	Notes	Ref.
1955	Sabrina Fair	David Larrabee	Theatre Royal, Windsor with Windsor Repertory Company	
1955–1956	The Teahouse of the August Moon	Sakini	Royal Lyceum Theatre, Edinburgh, New Theatre Oxford, Brighton Hippodrome	
1957	Damn Yankees	Mr Applegate	London Coliseum	
1958	You Too Can Have a Body	Lucky Wilson	UK tour	
1960	Once Upon a Mattress	Wizard	Adelphi Theatre, London	
1963–1967	The Bed-Sitting Room	Shelter Man / Plastic Mac Man / Richard Crossman / Underwater Vicar / Brigadier Sergeant	UK tour	
1964–1966	Son of Oblomov	Zakhar (replacement)	Comedy Theatre, London, Lyric Theatre, London	
1966	Son of Oblomov	Ilya Ilych Oblomov	New Theatre, Hull, Cambridge Arts Theatre, Knightstone Pavilion, Weston-super-Mare	
1968–1969	The Sleeping Beauty	Baron Bombarde, Captain of the Guard	Derby Playhouse	
1969	Rooted		Claremont Theatre Centre, Melbourne	
1969–1970	Play It Again, Sam	Humphrey Bogart	Globe Theatre, London	
1972	Liberty Ranch	Colonel Culpepper	Greenwich Theatre, London	
1972	The Good Old Bad Old Days	Simon	Theatre Royal, Nottingham, Prince of Wales Theatre, London	
1973–1974	A Funny Thing Happened on the Way to the Forum		Gaiety Theatre, Dublin, Theatre Royal, Newcastle, Congress Theatre, Eastbourne	
1974	Cole		Mermaid Theatre	
1975	Don't Just Lie There, Say Something!	The Rt Hon Wilfred Potts, PC, MP	UK tour	
1976	Salad Days	The Tramp / A Bishop / Tom Smith	Duke of York’s Theatre, London, Theatre Royal, Windsor	
1979	Something's Afoot	Col Gilweather	Playhouse, Perth	
1979	The Man from Mukinupin	Cecil Brunner / Max Montebello / The Flasher	Playhouse, Perth with National Theatre	
1980	Privates on Parade	Major Giles Flack	Playhouse, Perth with National Theatre	
1980	My Fair Lady	Alfred Doolittle	Australian tour	
1981	The Girl who Lived on Venus Street	Roger Van Dahl	Princess May Theatre, Fremantle with Winter Theatre	
1995	Paradise Lost		St George's Cathedral, Perth	
1996	Peter Pan		Regal Theatre, Perth	

== Radio ==
Year	Title	Role	Notes	Ref.
1948	Variety Bandbox	Presenter (replacement for Derek Roy)	BBC Light Programme	
1951	Happy Go Lucky	Scout	BBC Light Programme	
1954–1959	Hancock's Half Hour	William Montmorency Beaumont Kerr (Australian lodger)	BBC Radio	
1958–1963	The Flying Doctor	The Pilot	BBC Light Programme	
1979	A Plum Job	Archie	ABC Radio Perth	
1979	The Painting	Alder	ABC Radio Perth	
1979	Blossom	Mr. Shiner	ABC Radio Perth	
1979	Romulus the Great	Casesar Rupf	ABC Radio Perth	
