= Paul Smith (Australian actor) =

Australian actor

- Born: 1968 (age 57–58); Sydney, New South Wales, Australia
- Occupation: Former actor
- Years active: 1982–1995
- Known for: Hey Dad...!, The Henderson Kids

Paul Bernard Smith (born 1968) is an Australian former actor, who started his career as a child actor.

He is best known for starring as Steve Henderson in the Network Ten children's drama The Henderson Kids and for originating the role of Simon Kelly in the Seven Network sitcom Hey Dad...!

Smith also starred in the 1982 film Fighting Back.

== Career ==
Smith began his acting career at the age of 12. He had to finish his schooling, including his HSC, with private tutors, before he quit to concentrate on acting. Smith's first role was playing a juvenile delinquent in the 1982 film Fighting Back. Throughout the 1980s, Smith appeared in a number of television shows and films, including Platypus Cove, The Fire in the Stone, Waterloo Station, Boy in the Bush, Crime of the Decade, and The Cowra Breakout.

Smith starred in a two-part episode of A Country Practice called "Repairing The Damage" as a glue-sniffing addict. The episodes were later re-screened by Seven due to popular demand.

In 1985, Smith was cast as 15-year-old "easy-going" Steve Henderson in the Crawfords-produced The Henderson Kids on Network Ten. He turned down a role in Mad Max 3 to join the series which followed Steve and his sister Tamara, played by Nadine Garner, who are sent to the country to live with their uncle following the death of their mother. Smith found Steve to be more fun to play than some of his previous roles. He also enjoyed developing a good working relationship with Garner, and they became like brother and sister on the set. He reprised the role for The Henderson Kids II.

In 1986, Henderson was cast in the role of Simon Kelly in the Seven Network sitcom Hey Dad..!. He left the show after just one year, with Christopher Mayer taking over the role. He later said he left Hey Dad..! after "a big row with the producer."

== Filmography ==
=== Film ===
- Fighting Back (1982) as Tom Goodwood
- Platypus Cove (1983) as Jim Mason

=== Television ===
- Waterloo Station (1983) as Joey Daniels
- Boy in the Bush (TV miniseries) (1984) as Lennie
- The Fire in the Stone (TV movie) (1984) as Ernie Ryan
- The Cowra Breakout (TV miniseries) (1984) as Bob Davidson
- Crime of the Decade (TV movie) (1984) as Rolly
- A Country Practice (1984) as Andy
- The Henderson Kids (1985) as Steve Henderson
- The Henderson Kids II (1987) as Steve Henderson
- Hey Dad..! (1987) as Simon Kelly
- Mission: Impossible (1988) as Tim
- The Private War of Lucinda Smith (TV movie) (1990) as Private Reed
- Police Rescue (1991) as Wilson
- G.P. (1992) as Davo

=== Legal issues ===
On 24 July 1991, Smith was sentenced in Parramatta District Court to 18 months weekend detention after pleading guilty to 18 dishonesty charges, having admitted to using false names to defraud and embezzle $57,000 to satisfy his gambling addiction.

Smith said he had booked himself into the Wisteria House Rehabilitation Centre in August 1990 after he found himself gambling compulsively having had trouble coping with the sudden success of his acting career.
