= The Love Game (game show) =

Television series

- Genre: Dating; Game Show
- Presented by: Mark Holden
- Narrated by: Gavin Wood
- Country of origin: Australia
- Original language: English
- No. of seasons: 1

Production
- Running time: 22 minutes

Original release
- Network: Seven Network

The Love Game was a short lived Australian dating game show aired on the Seven Network in 1984. It was hosted by Mark Holden.

== Gameplay ==
A panel of three (later two) asked four contestants (two men & two women) a series of Love Game questions for an unmentioned amount of time. When the time was up, the panel voted for which two contestants (one man & one woman) should be the best together. In the two panelist era, the panel chose which girl they liked the best and then after asking one question to the fellas, choose whom to be with. The woman also won a $250 bonus if her choice matched the panel's. The newly-formed couple then went into what's called "The Love Machine". The Love Machine measures how attractive they really are. The bigger the attraction, the bigger the trip.

Midway through the show, a previously formed couple returned to the show to talk about their date.
