= Fast Talking =

- Directed by: Ken Cameron
- Written by: Ken Cameron
- Starring: Rod Zuanic; Steve Bisley; Tracy Mann
- Cinematography: David Gribble
- Distributed by: Filmways
- Release date: 1984
- Country: Australia
- Language: English
- Budget: A$1 million
- Box office: A$100,118 (Australia)

Fast Talking is a 1984 Australian film written and directed by Ken Cameron. It starred Rod Zuanic and Steve Bisley and Tracy Mann.

== Cast ==
- Rod Zuanic as Steve Carson
- Toni Allaylis as Vicki
- Christopher Truswell as Moose
- Gail Sweeney as Narelle
- Steve Bisley as Redback
- Peter Hehir as Ralph Carson
- Tracy Mann as Sharon Hart
- Denis Moore as Yates
- Julie McGregor as Steve's mother
- Gary Cook as Al Carson
- Antoinette Byron as Cashier
- Lucky Grills as Detective Holloway
- Alastair Duncan as School Inspector

== Production ==
Cameron had been a school teacher before he became a filmmaker and the script was based on his personal experiences:

I think I was playing around with an idea of a Ginger Meggs, Junior Ned Kelly, character who was in a state of flight and rebellion from, I suppose, his school as prison. It's a strange work in the sense that it's never really resolved, his story. He remains on the run at the end just as he was at the beginning. I guess that comes from 400 Blows. I think I was very influenced by 400 Blows, by Ken Loach's work. It was an amalgam of all those things. I think at that stage in my career I was trying to graft the things that had influenced me onto the things that I saw in my own world.

He wrote the first draft at a time when he did not think film Monkey Grip would get made. He put it off to make that movie then went back to it in 1982.

In order to cast the film, Cameron spent three months teaching drama classes in schools in western Sydney to find young actors. Rod Zuanic was discovered at a high school in Blacktown. Christopher Truswell was working as an apprentice printer when he responded to an advertisement on radio station. 2SM.

The movie was shot over six weeks at Balmain High School and in the suburb of Rozelle, New South Wales.

== Release ==
Cameron hoped to follow the adventures of his lead character in other films similar to that of Antoine Doinel in the movies of François Truffaut but Fast Talking was not sufficiently successful at the box office. However he did subsequently make another film about young people, Crime of the Decade, for the ABC, which he called an extension of his work for Fast Talking.

== Reception ==
Walter Goodman of The New York Times stated "FAST TALKING resembles the broken-down cars that keep appearing in its background, one of those heaps that has been put together with used parts by a mechanic with more enthusiasm than experience, and it takes only a few minutes of jolting along to know it isn't going to take us very far." Writing in Sun-Herald Susie Eisenhuth gave it 3 stars saying "It's a strong involving movie with plenty to say - and, at a time when local movies appear to be in the doldrums, it's especially welcome." The Age's Neil Jillett gives it a mixed review stating "In acting, writing, and most cinematic skills, 'Fast Talking' outshines the others." and later writing "There are other ways in which I find this a repellent film." Writing in Australian Cinema Adrian Martin says "Although Fast Talking is ultimately a fairly middle-of-the-road social issue film, and one that has been little cited critically since its release, it does have a number of distinctive, original elements that anticipate subsequent realist teen films, especially Jean-Claude Brisseau's De bruit et de fureur (The Sound and the Fury, 1988)" Writing in Cinema Papers Geoff Mayer concludes "Cameron has managed to elicit natural performances from the three young actors and they add a strong sense of verisimilitude to the film. This is also assisted by the film's earthy dialogue and Sharon Calcraft's alienating use of the slide guitar on the soundtrack. Fast Talking is uncompromising but deserves to be seen and discussed by a large audience." Also in Cinema Papers, commenting on the film alongside Cameron's telemovie, Crime of the Decade Mark Spratt writes "Cameron's films are well-paced, edited and directed without proclaiming themselves to be 'stylish'. Both are most concerned with drawing identifiable teenage characters and realistically representing their contemporary problems. Perhaps this reflects a need for Australian audiences to see themselves as they are and the notion of documentary realism being more worthwhile than 'art' or directorial flights of fancy. " The Bulletin's Sandra Hall gives it a positive review and says "Fast Talking confirms [Cameron's] talent for catching the chancy rythmns of life on the edge." In 2017 Street Machine looked back at the movie and gave it a verdict of 4/5 "A sadly forgotten and underrated Australian cinematic gem, Fast Talking mixes laugh-out-loud hilarity with poignant drama."

== Awards ==
- 1984 Australian Film Institute Awards
  - Best Achievement in Direction - Ken Cameron - nominated
  - Best Original Screenplay - Ken Cameron - nominated
  - Best Supporting Actor - Peter Hehir - nominated
  - Best Supporting Actor - Steve Bisley - nominated
- 1984 AWGIE Awards
  - Film. Best Original Screenplay - Ken Cameron - won
