= Crime of the Decade =

- Written by: Michael Gow
- Directed by: Ken Cameron
- Starring: Mark Davis; Toni Allaylis; John Gregg
- Music by: Chris Neal
- Country of origin: Australia
- Original language: English

Production
- Producer: Michael Carson
- Cinematography: Julian Penney
- Editor: Michael Honey
- Running time: 75 minutes

Original release
- Network: ABC
- Release: 19 August 1984

Crime of the Decade is a 1984 Australian TV movie. It was the fourth in a collection of six films in the series Sunday Australian Movies.

== Plot ==
A newly successful politician, Laurie Fletcher (John Gregg) hosts a dinner celebration. Meanwhile, a group of troubled youths (including Steve, Jeff and Elly) congregate in the community centre run by social worker Terry (John Jarratt). Elly flees home when her mother's partner tries to sexually assault her. The two worlds collide with disastrous consequences.

== Cast ==
- Mark Davis as Steve
- Toni Allaylis as Elly
- John Gregg as Laurie Fletcher
- Paul Smith as Rolly
- John Jarratt as Terry
- John Hamblin as Ian Henderson
- Vicki Luke as Sue Henderson
- Belinda Giblin as Jane Fletcher
- Bill Pearson as Richard Brown
- Russell Newman as Constance Duncan
- Sonja Tallis as Pamela Brown
- Lynne Porteous as Elly's Mother
- Judy Nunn as Rolly's Mother
- Angela Cockburn as Steve's Mother
- Gary Cook as Jeff
- Christopher Truswell as Bruce Smith

== Reception ==
Marie McNamara of The Age wrote: "Although the program has some redeeming point, notably performances by newcomers such as Mark Davis and Tony Ellaylis, the plight of bored and angry youth has been done to death." Jacqueline Lee Lewes in The Sun-Herald said: "It sounds a depressing subject and one that has certainly been done before. Indeed Crime of the Decade is not an "entertainment". It's an uncomfortable, confronting story, humourlessly told, but it is a subject worth tackling time and time again." Dennis Pryor in The Age called it "a lump of politics tarted up as heart-rending social realism." In The Sydney Morning Herald, Mike Carlton praised the performances of Davis and Ellaylis, saying: "Crime of the Decade had a lot to say about the wall that has divided a generation off from the rest of us, but in the end you couldn't see the wall for the bricks." Cinema Papers' Mark Spratt, also commenting on Fast Talking, wrote: "Cameron's films are well-paced, edited and directed without proclaiming themselves to be 'stylish'. Both are most concerned with drawing identifiable teenage characters and realistically representing their contemporary problems." John O'Hara writes in Cinema Papers: "The film is too much like an illustrated lecture in which all the real points for discussion have been taken for granted. Its effect is to promote the tedium from which the young are shown to suffer. Nothing can be done, so everything is excused."
