= Murder of Kylie Maybury =

1984 child murder in Melbourne, Australia

Kylie Maybury
- Kylie Maybury
- Born: Kylie Maria Antonia Maybury; 24 October 1978; Melbourne, Victoria, Australia
- Died: 6 November 1984 (aged 6); Preston, Victoria, Australia
- Cause of death: Homicide by asphyxiation
- Body discovered: Preston, Victoria, Australia
- Resting place: Fawkner Crematorium and Memorial Park, Hadfield, Victoria, Australia
- Known for: Murder victim

The Murder of Kylie Maybury, occurred on 6 November 1984 after she was first kidnapped and raped. Maybury was an Australian schoolgirl from Preston, an inner-city suburb of Melbourne, Victoria, Australia. The murder occurred on the same date as the 1984 Melbourne Cup Day; and she was nicknamed in the Melbourne tabloid newspaper The Sun News-Pictorial as the Cup Day Girl.

More than 30 years after her death, in June 2016 Victoria Police arrested and charged Gregory Keith Davies with the abduction, rape, and murder of Maybury. Davies later pleaded guilty to the murder and rape of Maybury and in December 2017 he was sentenced to life imprisonment with a non-parole period of 28 years.

== Abduction and murder ==
Modern-day map of Preston, Victoria

Maybury lived with her younger sister, Rebecca, and their mother, Julie, in Gregory Grove. She was a primary school student in grade one and was enrolled in calisthenics (to give historical context: the early 1980s was an era of an exercise and fitness movement targeted at little girls and adult women).

On the afternoon of 6 November 1984, Maybury had been sent to a convenience store on Plenty Road to buy a bag of sugar, which she bought at around 5:30 p.m. She was last seen going home, carrying the sugar, and looking as if she were lost. Her mother and neighbour went looking for her at around 6:00 p.m., when a woman approached them saying that she'd seen a girl being driven away in a white Holden station wagon. Maybury's body was found in the gutter of Donald Street at about 12:45 a.m. the next morning by a fire brigade electrician, Neil Rickwood, but had not been there when police searched the street at 7:30 p.m.

She had died of asphyxiation while being raped and had suffered severe internal injuries, including vaginal trauma. The autopsy found that diazepam, a strong sedative, was in her body, suggesting that she had been drugged.

== Investigation ==
Maybury's murder received significant media coverage.

Maybury was interred at Fawkner Crematorium and Memorial Park. Her grandfather, John Moss, was a suspect, committing suicide in 1985. Her uncle, Mark Maybury, was similarly a suspect in the case; he committed suicide in jail in 1987. He was later found to be innocent of the crime, and is buried in the same cemetery as Maybury.

In the 1990s, Victorian Police focused their attention on Robert Arthur Selby Lowe, who had murdered Melbourne schoolgirl Sheree Beasley. Shortly before Maybury's murder, Lowe had been interviewed by police about offensive behaviour to young girls near Preston. DNA profiling later proved that Lowe was not responsible for Maybury's murder. Victoria Police began a new investigation into the murder among other cold cases in 2014, after media interest in the case led to numerous suspects being reported to the police.

=== Charges, committal and sentencing ===
In June 2016, 73-year-old Gregory Keith Davies was charged with the false imprisonment, rape and murder of Maybury, with a committal hearing for the case scheduled for May 2017. Davies had been interviewed by police two days after the murder during the original investigation. In 1970, he had bludgeoned a teenage girl with a hammer and told police he intended to rape her. At the time of the attack on Maybury, Davies lived in the area with his mother, and drove a white Holden HQ station wagon, but was removed from the investigation without giving a DNA sample because he gave an alibi.

On 29 May 2017, Davies pleaded guilty to one charge of murder and one of rape, and asked for the false imprisonment charge to be taken into consideration. The following day, Davies was remanded into custody until a plea hearing on 21 September. On 23 July, Davies was attacked by another inmate while on remand, suffering serious burns from scalding water.

On 21 December 2017, Davies was sentenced by Justice Lex Lasry in the Supreme Court of Victoria to life imprisonment with a non-parole period of 28 years. With time in custody taken into account, Davies will be eligible for parole in June 2044; however, as he will be 101 years of age at that time, he will almost certainly spend the rest of his life in custody.

=== Other legal matters involving Davies ===
Earlier in his life Davies was convicted of another sex crime; and, according to a relative, Davies spent years jailed for other sex crimes against children. After the publicity of Maybury's rape and murder, several children told their parents that Davies had sexually assaulted them, but the charges against Davies were dropped as prosecutors suggested that it would be too hard for the children to testify in court. Lasry revealed in the sentencing proceedings that in May 1968 Davies was placed on a three-year good behaviour bond for larceny, fraud, and uttering. In February 1971 he was tried in the Victorian Supreme Court on the charge of attempted murder and wounding with intent to cause grievous bodily harm, the victim being a 14-year-old girl. Davies was acquitted on the basis on insanity, yet ordered to be detained at the Governor's pleasure and was released from custody on 3 November 1982. During this ten-year period in custody, Davies did not undergo any psychiatric treatment. In 1993 Davies was convicted on a number of burglary, theft, and dishonesty charges; in 1996 he was convicted of charges involving indecent assault and gross indecency charges for which he served time in custody.

== See also ==
- List of kidnappings
