= Peter Veness =

Australian journalist

Peter Veness (10 April 1984 – 15 January 2012) was an Australian journalist. He worked in the Press Gallery at Parliament House for the Australian Associated Press.

Veness joined the AAP in 2006. He was diagnosed with a rare form of brain cancer in 2009 and died on 15 January 2012. His funeral was attended by Prime Minister Julia Gillard and several Senators.
