= Ken Cameron =

Australian film and television director

- Born: 1946 (age 79–80); Tenterfield, New South Wales, Australia
- Education: Sydney University
- Occupations: Film and television director and writer

Ken Cameron (born 1946) is an Australian film and television director and writer. Cameron was born in Tenterfield, New South Wales, Australia and graduated from Sydney University with BA in 1968. He has won two AFI Awards for directing.

== Filmography ==
- Out of It (1977) - short
- Temperament Unsuited (1978) - short
- Monkey Grip (1982)
- On the Loose (1984) - writer only
- Fast Talking (1984)
- Crime of the Decade (1984) TV
- The Umbrella Woman (1987)
- Stringer (1988) TV series
- The Clean Machine (1988) TV
- Bangkok Hilton (1989) TV mini-series
- Police Crop: The Winchester Conspiracy (1990) TV
- Brides of Christ (1991) TV mini-series
- Joh's Jury (1993) TV
- Oldest Living Confederate Widow Tells All (1994) TV
- Bordertown (1995) TV mini-series
- Dalva (1996) TV
- Payback (1997) TV
- Miracle at Midnight (1998) TV
- Secret Men's Business (1999) TV
- Halifax f.p: A Person of Interest (2000) TV
- My Brother Jack (2001) (TV)
- White Collar Blue (2002) TV
- The Strip (2008) TV

=== Unmade films ===
- Matilda, My Darling - story of Waltzing Matilda
