= Julie McGregor =

Australian actress

- Born: Julie Anne McGregor; 26 November 1948 (age 77); Sydney, New South Wales, Australia
- Occupations: Actress, singer, comedian
- Years active: 1968–present
- Partner: Adam McFarlane

Julie Anne McGregor (born 26 November 1948) is an Australian film and television actress, singer and comedian and voice artist, She has also worked in theatre.

She is notable for her roles in comedy, most especially for her role in the TV series sitcom Hey Dad! as Betty Wilson from 1987 until 1994, after which she a brief hiatus away from the industry, she returned to theatre roles from starting from 1997, including a 2021 production of a musical based on country singer Patsy Cline but in more recent years has returned to entertainment and role's and in 2024 in an interview with magazine New Idea she announced she had signed with a new agent.

== Career ==
McGregor was born in Sydney, New South Wales on 26 November 1948, and has worked in the industry since the age of 18 in 1968 in theatre, as a singer, accompanist and performer. In the 1970s, McGregor appeared in the Australian sketch comedy The Naked Vicar Show. In the 1980s McGregor appeared in guest roles in television soap operas including A Country Practice, Punishment and Sons and Daughters.

McGregor is best known to Australian audiences for her role as Betty Wilson, the red-haired dim-witted and ditsy secretary from Walgett in the Australian television comedy series, Hey Dad..!. She continued in the role for the program's entire 1987–1994 run, and also appeared in its short-lived spinoff Hampton Court. In 1992 McGregor was nominated in the Australian Logie Awards in the 'Most Popular Light Entertainment/Comedy Female Performer' category for Hey Dad...!.

In the 2010s she was the reader for audiobooks of Blinky Bill.

== Personal life ==
McGregor is the sister of opera soprano Jennifer McGregor.

After living in Paddington, New South Wales for most of her life, in 2007 McGregor moved to the Blue Mountains, west of Sydney. She lives with her husband, a poet and sculptor, on 0.4 hectares of land in an 1860 sandstone home.

== Filmography ==
- The Naked Vicar Show (1977) TV Series .... Various Characters (1977)
- Backroads (1977) .... Anna
- Palm Beach (1979) .... Kate O'Brien
- Don't Ask Us (1980) TV Series
- Punishment (1981) TV Series .... Julie Smith
- Sons and Daughters (1982) TV Series .... Gloria Dutton (1984)
- Deadline (1982) (TV) .... Barneys Girl
- The City's Edge (1983) (V) .... Goldilocks
- Fast Talking (1984) .... Steve's mother
- Hey Dad...! (1986) TV Series .... Betty Wilson (1986–1994)
- Hampton Court (1991) TV Series .... Betty Wilson
- Leunig Animated (2002) (V) (voice)
- Dive Olly Dive (2005) (voice)...Skid
- Super Why! (voice)...Wonder Red

== Television ==
- Hey Dad (1986–1994) TV series ... Betty
- Celebrity Wheel Of Fortune (1991) (TV series) ... Contestant

== Discography ==
=== Albums ===
List of albums, with selected chart positions
Title	Album details	Peak chart positions
Title	Album details	AUS
Live from The Madge Burrows Room! / The Naked Vicar Show (with Ross Higgins, Kev Golsby and Colin McEwan)	Released: 1978; Format: LP; Label: EMI (EMC-2671)	84
Farmhouse (as part of Farmhouse)	Released: November 1991; Format: CD, Cassette; Label: RCA (VPCD 0845)	95
Martin Vs Betty - The Best of "Hey Dad..!" (with Robert Hughes)	Released: 1991; Format: CD, Cassette; Label: 7 Records (HDR 1991)	-
