= List of Hey Dad..! episodes =

The following is a list of episodes for the television show Hey Dad..!.

== Unaired episodes ==
Title	Ep.#	Code	Airdate	Director	Writer(s)
Pilot	0	HDA-000	unaired	Kevin Burston	Gary Reilly, John Flanagan
An increasingly distressed Martin fires his know-it-all secretary Miss Stephens. Cousin Betty meets the Kellys for the first time when she arrives from Walgett, and the police are called when Betty's luggage disappears. Guest starring Tina Bursill as Det. Sgt. Anne Burke, Emma Gray as Miss Stephens, and Scott Higgins as Det. McEwan. Note: The pilot was produced in September 1985, but was never aired in its original form. The pilot was made available to the public for the first time on the 2008 German DVD release of Hey Dad..! Season 1. Prior to this, scenes from the pilot had only been aired as part of the flashback episode, Country Cousin.
One for the Road (version 1)	-	unknown	unaired	Kevin Burston	Gary Reilly, John Flanagan
Betty settles into the office, and Martin confronts Simon about damage to the Volvo. Note: This was the second episode to be recorded. This episode had never been seen by the public in its original form until Polyband included it on their Hey Dad..! Season 1 DVD release. Prior to this, scenes from this episode had only been aired as part of the flashback episode, One for the Road (version 2).

== Season 1 (1987) ==
The only season to include cast member Paul Smith (Simon), and guest appearances by Tina Bursill (Detective Sergeant Anne Burke). The first 12 episodes were produced in 1986. The season 1 opening credits feature the cast having their pictures taken during a picnic in the park. This was shot at Boronia Park in Hunters Hill.

Title	Ep.#	Code	Airdate	Director	Writer(s)
Just a Formality	1	HDA-001	11 February 1987	Kevin Burston	Gary Reilly, John Flanagan
Debbie's formal threatens to be a disaster, despite help from Betty and Nudge. Guest starring Jeremy Shadlow as Adrian Stevenage. Note: This was the third episode to be recorded.
Post Early for Charisma	2	HDA-002	18 February 1987	Kevin Burston	Gary Reilly, John Flanagan
In an attempt to improve his luck with the ladies, Nudge embarks on a charisma diet.
Home from the Hills	3	HDA-003	25 February 1987	Kevin Burston	Gary Reilly, John Flanagan
Martin's mother returns from trekking in the Himalayas. Guest starring Moya O'Sullivan as Grandma.
Nudge Nudge Wink Wink	4	HDA-004	4 March 1987	Kevin Burston	Gary Reilly, John Flanagan
Betty auditions for a role in The Sound of Music, and Nudge sleeps over.
The Firing Line	5	HDA-005	11 March 1987	Kevin Burston	Gary Reilly, John Flanagan
Betty is fired from her job, and Nudge has a Sesame Street fixation.
Meet Hector the Piano	6	HDA-006	18 March 1987	Kevin Burston	Gary Reilly, John Flanagan
Betty finds a flat, and is reunited with one of her prized possessions, while Simon falls in love with his teacher.
Battle Stations	7	HDA-007	25 March 1987	Kevin Burston	Gary Reilly, John Flanagan
A rainy day increases the tensions in the Kelly house.
Sick in Transit	8	HDA-008	1 April 1987	Kevin Burston	Gary Reilly, John Flanagan
Martin's Day of the Year becomes more memorable with family aid.
Licence to Kill	9	HDA-009	8 April 1987	Kevin Burston	Gary Reilly, John Flanagan
Nudge tries for a driver's licence and Debbie tries to leave school.
Fair Cop	10	HDA-010	15 April 1987	Kevin Burston	Gary Reilly, John Flanagan
Martin joins Neighbourhood Watch after meeting Detective Sergeant Anne Burke. Guest starring Tina Bursill.
Country Cousin	11	HDA-011	22 April 1987	Kevin Burston	Gary Reilly, John Flanagan
The Kellys recall their first meeting with Betty. Guest starring Tina Bursill as Det. Sgt. Anne Burke, Emma Gray as Miss Stephens, and Scott Higgins as Det. McEwan. Note: This is the first flashback episode, featuring previously unaired footage of the pilot. This was also the first episode screened in Germany.
One for the Road (version 2)	12	HDA-012	29 April 1987	Kevin Burston	Gary Reilly, John Flanagan
Simon is in trouble when he smashes the Volvo after being in a pub. Note: This flashback episode contains scenes from One for the Road (version 1). As done with Country Cousin, new pre-flashback scenes were recorded and added to explain the break in continuity. A lot of Martin's one-liners to camera in version 1 are cut out of this version due to time constraints with the added scenes.
Justice I Suspected	13	HDA-013	6 May 1987	Sally Brady	Gary Reilly, John Flanagan
Nudge is arrested by the police and put on trial.
In The Mode	14	HDA-014	13 May 1987	Sally Brady	Gary Reilly, John Flanagan
Plans for Simon's birthday party come adrift when Debbie wants new clothes. Note: Cast regular Sarah Monahan does not appear in this episode.
The Dating Game	15	HDA-015	20 May 1987	Sally Brady	Gary Reilly, John Flanagan
Nudge acts as a matchmaker between Martin and Sergeant Anne. Guest starring Tina Bursill. Note: Cast regular Sarah Monahan does not appear in this episode.
Sulky Jenny, Flipper and Hamlet	16	HDA-016	27 May 1987	Sally Brady	Gary Reilly, John Flanagan
Simon tries to get out of playing Hamlet in the school play, and Jenny's frustrations with the family boil over.
Stan the Man	17	HDA-017	3 June 1987	Sally Brady	Gary Reilly, John Flanagan
Betty's boyfriend Stan Hickey arrives to claim her as his bride. Guest starring Bill Young.
Leader of the Pack	18	HDA-018	10 June 1987	Sally Brady	Gary Reilly, John Flanagan
Simon's best friend becomes more interested in motorbikes than their friendship.
Do the Right Thing	19	HDA-019	17 June 1987	Sally Brady	Gary Reilly, John Flanagan
Simon has to decide if he should report a drug dealer at school. Note: Cast regular Sarah Monahan does not appear in this episode.
Matinee Idle	20	HDA-020	24 June 1987	Sally Brady	Gary Reilly, John Flanagan
Concerned about violence on TV, Martin books a holiday without television.
Mum's the Word	21	HDA-021	1 July 1987	Sally Brady	Gary Reilly, John Flanagan
Martin plans to sell the house, but has not told the children. His mother becomes coach for Simon and Nudge's cricket team. Guest starring Moya O'Sullivan.
Cop This Lot	22	HDA-022	8 July 1987	Sally Brady	Gary Reilly, John Flanagan
Martin continues his relationship with Sergeant Anne Burke, and Debbie gets her L plates. Guest starring Tina Bursill.
Nudge the Love God	23	HDA-023	15 July 1987	Sally Brady	Gary Reilly, John Flanagan
Nudge falls in love with the new girl in town. Guest starring Shannon Kenny as Tracey. Note: Cast regular Sarah Monahan does not appear in this episode.
Jono & Dano Meet Nudgo the Magnificent	24	HDA-024	22 July 1987	Sally Brady	Gary Reilly, John Flanagan
Nudge, Simon and Debbie enter the Have A Go TV talent contest. Guest starring Jono & Dano as themselves, and Denise Drysdale, Frankie J. Holden and Jeanne Little as the judges. Note: Cast regular Sarah Monahan does not appear in this episode.
Democracy at Work	25	HDA-025	29 July 1987	Sally Brady	Gary Reilly, John Flanagan
Nudge and Simon are worried about how to vote in the election. Note: "Dobbin" appears courtesy of the RSPCA.
Panda Monium	26	HDA-026	5 August 1987	Sally Brady	Gary Reilly, John Flanagan
Betty buys Martin a stuffed panda, and Simon studies hard for the exams, though Nudge does not care.
Nun Today Thank You	27	HDA-027	12 August 1987	Sally Brady	Gary Reilly, John Flanagan
The Kellys find themselves face to face with a nine-year-old nun.
As Time Goes By	28	HDA-028	2 September 1987	Sally Brady	Gary Reilly, John Flanagan
Martin thinks he is having a mid life crisis. Guest starring Tina Bursill as Det. Sgt. Anne Burke.
Mumps the Word	29	HDA-029	9 September 1987	Sally Brady	Gary Reilly, John Flanagan
When Jenny comes down with a case of the mumps, Martin tries to contact his mother for advice, but she is deep in the Amazon.
Horror Scope	30	HDA-030	16 September 1987	Sally Brady	Gary Reilly, John Flanagan
Journalist Nudge thinks he has found a scoop.
Cyberphobia	31	HDA-031	23 September 1987	Sally Brady	Gary Reilly, John Flanagan
Martin gets a computer for the office. Guest starring Paris & Larissa Burnett as Angela and Kathy.
Tycoon Nudge	32	HDA-032	30 September 1987	Sally Brady	Gary Reilly, John Flanagan
Nudge makes his entrance into the world of high finance.
Tall Tales But True	33	HDA-033	7 October 1987	Sally Brady	Gary Reilly, John Flanagan
The return of Stan Hickey brings bad news for Betty. Guest starring Bill Young. Note: Cast regular Paul Smith does not appear in this episode.
Not the Volvo	34	HDA-034	14 October 1987	Sally Brady	Gary Reilly, John Flanagan
The Volvo is stolen, and no one but Martin cares. Guest starring Tina Bursill as Det. Sgt. Anne Burke. Note: Cast regular Sarah Monahan does not appear in this episode.
A Laws Unto Himself	35	HDA-035	21 October 1987	Sally Brady	Gary Reilly, John Flanagan
Nudge enters the art world, and Betty's favorite radio announcer helps her get a raise. Guest starring John Laws as himself. Note: Cast regular Sarah Monahan does not appear in this episode.
Debbie's Debut	36	HDA-036	28 October 1987	Sally Brady	Gary Reilly, John Flanagan
Nudge incorrectly thinks he is taking Debbie to her debutante ball.
A Friend Indeed	37	HDA-037	4 November 1987	Sally Brady	Gary Reilly, John Flanagan
Martin feels he needs a change of image.
Everything Must Go	38	HDA-038	11 November 1987	Sally Brady	Gary Reilly, John Flanagan
Martin's garage sale is a bit light-on for customers. Note: Paul Smith's final appearance as Simon.
Affairs of the Heart	39	HDA-039	18 November 1987	Sally Brady	Gary Reilly, John Flanagan
After Simon leaves for the United States, Nudge finally has some success in the romance stakes. Note: Cast regular Paul Smith is credited but does not appear in this episode.

== Season 2 (1988) ==
Marks the debut of new cast regular Christopher Mayer as Simon, and Joanne Samuel's first guest appearance as Jeanette. It is also the first time creative duties are assigned to writers other than Gary Reilly and John Flanagan. A new opening titles sequence features the regular cast members posing for photographs in the Kelly house.

Title	Ep.#	Code	Airdate	Director	Writer(s)
Home at Last!	40	HDA2-001	10 February 1988	Sally Brady	Gary Reilly, John Flanagan
Simon arrives back from his trip to America. Guest starring Moya O'Sullivan as Grandma. Note: Christopher Mayer's first episode as Simon.
Plumbers Do It Better!	41	HDA2-002	17 February 1988	Sally Brady	Gary Reilly, John Flanagan
Nudge is not worried about his HSC results, because he has a job lined up.
Cat-astrophie	42	HDA2-003	24 February 1988	Sally Brady	Gary Reilly, John Flanagan
Martin is locked in an endless struggle with the local cat.
Working Bee	43	HDA2-004	2 March 1988	Sally Brady	Gary Reilly, John Flanagan
Martin is offered a job away from home, and Nudge becomes a banker.
Phone Home - If You Can!	44	HDA2-005	9 March 1988	Sally Brady	Gary Reilly, John Flanagan
Martin has trouble getting Telecom to fix the phone service.
Sorry! Wrong Answer	45	HDA2-006	16 March 1988	Sally Brady	Gary Reilly, John Flanagan
Martin gets an answering machine for the office.
Follow That Wave!	46	HDA2-007	23 March 1988	Sally Brady	Gary Reilly, John Flanagan
Simon and Nudge teach Martin and Debbie how to surf.
The Love Triangle	47	HDA2-008	30 March 1988	Sally Brady	Gary Reilly, John Flanagan
Martin finds himself the object of a beautiful client's affection. Guest starring Candy Raymond as Felicity Simpson-Green.
Suspicious Stan	48	HDA2-009	6 April 1988	Sally Brady	Gary Reilly, John Flanagan
Stan thinks Betty is having an affair, and tries to catch her in the act. Guest starring Bill Young as Stan Hickey.
Turning Japanese	49	HDA2-010	13 April 1988	Sally Brady	Gary Reilly, John Flanagan
Betty takes up Japanese to improve her chances at an audition.
Tycoon Debbie	50	HDA2-011	20 April 1988	Sally Brady	Gary Reilly, John Flanagan
Debbie starts a business designing T-shirts.
With Love - Nudge	51	HDA2-012	27 April 1988	Sally Brady	Steve J. Spears
Simon tutors Nudge in the art of writing love letters. Note: Cast regular Sarah Monahan does not appear in this episode.
The Party!	52	HDA2-013	4 May 1988	Sally Brady	Gary Reilly, John Flanagan
Simon and Debbie throw a party while Martin is away on business. Note: Cast regular Sarah Monahan does not appear in this episode.
Get Crook Soon	53	HDA2-014	11 May 1988	Sally Brady	Gary Reilly, John Flanagan
Nudge and Debbie think of a way to amass a quick fortune.
Paris or Bust	54	HDA2-015	18 May 1988	Sally Brady	Gary Reilly, John Flanagan
Debbie wants to study in Paris, but Martin forbids it.
Feast or Famine	55	HDA2-016	25 May 1988	Sally Brady	Gary Reilly, John Flanagan
Simon, Nudge and Debbie take part in the 40 Hour Famine. Guest starring Bill Young as Stan Hickey.
Safety Last!	56	HDA2-017	1 June 1988	Sally Brady	Bill Young, Kym Goldsworthy
A spate of burglaries gives the Kellys reason to worry about Betty.
For the Love of Art	57	HDA2-018	8 June 1988	Sally Brady	Gary Reilly, John Flanagan
Martin is worried when Jenny takes to reading romance novels.
Make My Day	58	HDA2-019	15 June 1988	Sally Brady	Gary Reilly, John Flanagan
The family is stunned when Simon announces his engagement.
Designer Love	59	HDA2-020	22 June 1988	Sally Brady	Kym Goldsworthy, Bill Young
Betty and Jenny turns their hands to redecorating Martin's office.
Bash and Trash	60	HDA2-021	29 June 1988	Sally Brady	David Cummings
Nudge teaches Jenny how to be a lady, and Betty writes a romance novel.
Simon Says!!	61	HDA2-022	6 July 1988	Sally Brady	Gary Reilly, John Flanagan
Simon and Nudge express their disapproval of Debbie's new boyfriend. Guest starring Tom Jennings as Tom Bennett.
Strike Me Lucky	62	HDA2-023	13 July 1988	Sally Brady	Hugh Stuckey
Betty goes on strike, and Simon and Nudge buy a Volkswagen.
How Green Is My Volksy?	63	HDA2-024	20 July 1988	Sally Brady	Gary Reilly, John Flanagan
Nudge finds himself homeless.
The Black and White Blues	64	HDA2-025	27 July 1988	Sally Brady	Gary Reilly, John Flanagan
Debbie plots to get mentioned in a newspaper's social column, and Simon resigns from his job.
Chain of Iron	65	HDA2-026	3 August 1988	Sally Brady	Kym Goldsworthy, Bill Young
Betty is concerned after she receives a chain letter in the mail, and the boys are impressed with Debbie's Ironman date. Guest starring Craig Riddington as himself.
Home Sweet Home	66	HDA2-027	10 August 1988	Sally Brady	Gary Reilly, John Flanagan, David Cummings
Nudge moves into his own flat, and asks Debbie how to impress girls.
Just Being Neighbourly	67	HDA2-028	31 August 1988	Sally Brady	Gary Reilly, John Flanagan
Martin falls in love when a new neighbour moves in. Guest starring Joanne Samuel as Jeanette Taylor.
Shopping for Love	68	HDA2-029	7 September 1988	Sally Brady	Hugh Stuckey
Martin has a date with a woman he met in the supermarket.
Keeping Mum	69	HDA2-030	14 September 1988	Sally Brady	Gary Reilly, John Flanagan
Debbie discovers the identity of Jenny's secret friend. Note: An image of Martin's deceased wife Margaret is shown for the first time in this episode. The photograph is actually of Simone Buchanan's mother.
Up, Up and Away	70	HDA2-031	21 September 1988	Sally Brady	Hugh Stuckey
Martin has a dream come true, and Betty goes into business with Nudge.
Share and Share Alike	71	HDA2-032	28 September 1988	Sally Brady	Gary Reilly, John Flanagan
Simon and Nudge have difficulty sharing the Volkswagen. Guest starring Moya O'Sullivan as Grandma.
VW for Sale	72	HDA2-033	5 October 1988	Sally Brady	Kym Goldsworthy, Bill Young
Martin finds a solution to the arguments over the Volkswagen. Guest starring Michael Caton as Chris Gordon.
Up the Well Known Creek	73	HDA2-034	12 October 1988	Sally Brady	Gary Reilly, John Flanagan
Simon, Nudge and Debbie plan a river trip. Guest starring Bill Young as Stan Hickey.
My Affair Lady	74	HDA2-035	19 October 1988	Sally Brady	Bill Young, Kym Goldsworthy
Betty is convinced she is having an affair with the local greengrocer.
Out of Sight - Out of Mind	75	HDA2-036	26 October 1988	Sally Brady	Gary Reilly, John Flanagan
Debbie refuses to admit she is having trouble with her vision.
Keep Taking the Meditation!	76	HDA2-037	2 November 1988	Sally Brady	Gary Reilly, John Flanagan
Debbie, Simon and Nudge find the way to enlightenment.
Timely Fashion	77	HDA2-038	9 November 1988	Sally Brady	Ken Matthews, David Witt
With firings on the horizon, Simon and Nudge try to impress their boss.
Once a Knight Is Enough	78	HDA2-039	16 November 1988	Sally Brady	Gary Reilly, John Flanagan
The stakes are high when Martin takes part in a game of chess.

== Season 3 (1989-1990) ==
With 49 episodes produced in 1989, this is the longest of any Hey Dad..! season, and the only one to feature guest appearances by Beth Buchanan (Cousin Elaine) and Kate Morris (Katie). It is also the first time that exterior shots of the Kelly house are shown.

Title	Ep.#	Code	Airdate	Director	Writer(s)
Trees Company	79	HDA3-001	8 February 1989	Sally Brady	Kym Goldsworthy
Martin is commissioned by the council to build a Bicentennial monument.
A Losing Battle	80	HDA3-002	15 February 1989	Sally Brady	Gary Reilly, John Flanagan
Jenny wants Martin and Betty to attend her parent-teacher night. Guest starring Lloyd Morris as Father Gerry Temple.
The Girl on the Cutting Room Floor	81	HDA3-003	22 February 1989	Sally Brady	Ken Matthews, David Witt
Debbie gets a role in a soft drink commercial.
The Late Miss Kelly	82	HDA3-004	1 March 1989	Sally Brady	Gary Reilly, John Flanagan
Debbie gets home late and incurs Martin's wrath.
A Question of Royalty	83	HDA3-005	8 March 1989	Sally Brady	Bill Young, Kym Goldsworthy
Nudge thinks he is adopted and may be of royal descent.
Generation Scrap	84	HDA3-006	15 March 1989	Sally Brady	John Flanagan
Betty becomes fixated by a new electric pencil sharpener.
May the Farce Be with You	85	HDA3-007	22 March 1989	Sally Brady	Kym Goldsworthy, Bill Young
Betty uses a crystal to try to bring peace and harmony to the household.
Three's a Crowd	86	HDA3-008	29 March 1989	Sally Brady	John Flanagan
Debbie and Jenny are unwilling to share a room. Guest starring Moya O'Sullivan as Grandma.
For the Love of Martin	87	HDA3-009	5 April 1989	Sally Brady	Hugh Stuckey
Martin meets his soulmate, and Betty thinks Stan has been unfaithful. Guest starring Joanne Samuel as Jeanette Taylor.
Kissing Cousins	88	HDA3-010	12 April 1989	Sally Brady	Gary Reilly, John Flanagan
The household gets a shock when another relative from the country arrives. Guest starring Beth Buchanan as Cousin Elaine.
Betty's Better Letterhead	89	HDA3-011	19 April 1989	Sally Brady	Ken Matthews, David Witt
Betty takes it upon herself to redesign the office stationery.
Job for the Boy	90	HDA3-012	26 April 1989	Sally Brady	Gary Reilly, John Flanagan
Martin is talked into giving Simon a job in the office. Note: Cast regular Christopher Truswell does not appear in this episode.
That's Shoe Biz	91	HDA3-013	3 May 1989	Sally Brady	Stephen Quinn
Debbie wants a clothing allowance, and Stan proposes marriage to Betty. Guest starring Bill Young.
Betty's Wedding - Part 1	92	HDA3-014	10 May 1989	Sally Brady	Gary Reilly, John Flanagan
The whole household prepares for Betty's marriage to Stan. Guest starring Bill Young.
Betty's Wedding - Part 2	93	HDA3-015	17 May 1989	Sally Brady	Gary Reilly, John Flanagan
Stan is not sure he can go through with the wedding. Guest starring Bill Young as Stan Hickey, Kevin Golsby as Monsignor O'Donohue, and Joanne Samuel as Jeanette Taylor.
The Double Date	94	HDA3-016	24 May 1989	Sally Brady	Kym Goldsworthy, Ian Rochford
Nudge receives lessons in etiquette from Debbie.
The Beat Goes Wrong	95	HDA3-017	31 May 1989	Sally Brady	Gary Reilly, John Flanagan
Simon and Nudge develop an interest in drumming.
Banana Republic Blues	96	HDA3-018	7 June 1989	Sally Brady	Kym Goldsworthy, Ian Rochford
Martin is confused when he gets a cheque written on a banana. Guest starring Lloyd Morris as Andy.
Family Law	97	HDA3-019	14 June 1989	Sally Brady	Neil Stewart, Joan Flanagan
Jenny is fed up with the family and tries to divorce them.
Visiting Rights	98	HDA3-020	21 June 1989	Sally Brady	Gary Reilly, John Flanagan
The rest of the family is upset when Martin allows cousin Elaine to stay. Guest starring Beth Buchanan.
Guess Who's Not Coming to Dinner	99	HDA3-021	28 June 1989	Sally Brady	Kym Goldsworthy, Ian Rochford
Debbie takes care of Jenny after a billy cart accident.
Kiss and Makeup	100	HDA3-022	5 July 1989	Sally Brady	Gary Reilly, John Flanagan
Martin hires his neighbour Jeanette to do some decorating for a client. Guest starring Joanne Samuel.
Phantom on the Roof	101	HDA3-023	12 July 1989	Sally Brady	Gary Reilly, John Flanagan
Nudge enters a TV quiz show, with The Phantom comic as his special subject.
Democracy Rules K.O.	102	HDA3-024	19 July 1989	Sally Brady	Kym Goldsworthy, Ian Rochford
Jenny nominates for school captain, and Simon has trouble enrolling at university. Guest starring Sharon Tamlyn as Const. Julie, Doug Scroope as Sgt. Maloney, and Kate Morris as Katie.
Never an Idol Moment	103	HDA3-025	26 July 1989	Leigh Spence	Gary Reilly, John Flanagan
Betty searches for a new role model.
Ol' Black Thumb Is Back	104	HDA3-026	9 August 1989	Leigh Spence	Gary Reilly, John Flanagan
Martin has the kiss of death where his indoor plants are concerned.
Time Healeys All Wounds	105	HDA3-027	16 August 1989	Leigh Spence	Gary Reilly, John Flanagan
Martin is tempted to purchase an Austin-Healey sports car.
The Name Rings a Bell	106	HDA3-028	23 August 1989	Sally Brady	Gary Reilly, John Flanagan
Nudge and Betty install a new, more powerful electronic doorbell.
Crime and Punishment	107	HDA3-029	30 August 1989	Sally Brady	Kym Goldsworthy, Ian Rochford
Betty is evacuated when a flash flood hits her flat.
Stop Thief!	108	HDA3-030	6 September 1989	Sally Brady	Gary Reilly, John Flanagan
Betty wants a company car, but ends up on the wrong side of the law.
Say a Little Prayer For Me!	109	HDA3-031	13 September 1989	Sally Brady	Neil Stewart, Joan Flanagan
Simon turns to religion, and Jenny cleans up on the stock market.
Here's Mud In Your Eye	110	HDA3-032	20 September 1989	Sally Brady	Gary Reilly, John Flanagan
Unable to get a company car, Betty finds a new way to get to work. Guest starring Kate Morris as Katie.
In the Name of Art	111	HDA3-033	27 September 1989	Sally Brady	Stephen Quinn
Martin takes up painting as a hobby, but his efforts are not appreciated.
Finders Speakers	112	HDA3-034	4 October 1989	Sally Brady	Gary Reilly, John Flanagan
Nudge earns some extra money by selling stolen hi-fi equipment
Room to Let	113	HDA3-035	11 October 1989	Sally Brady	Gary Reilly, John Flanagan
Nudge offers to take over Simon's room when Simon moves out.
A Finite Romance	114	HDA3-036	18 October 1989	Sally Brady	Kym Goldsworthy, Ian Rochford
Betty decides to put a stop to Martin and Jeanette's romance. Guest starring Joanne Samuel.
The Cluck of the Draw	115	HDA3-037	25 October 1989	Sally Brady	Gary Reilly, John Flanagan
Nudge gets into trouble working for a fast food company. Guest starring Natalie McCurry as Solva Elvirani, and Tom Oliver as the waiter.
Time Out	116	HDA3-038	1 November 1989	Sally Brady	Hugh Stuckey, John Flanagan
Betty decides to create a time capsule and starts filming everyone. Guest starring Beth Buchanan as Elaine.
Colour My World	117	HDA3-039	8 November 1989	Sally Brady	Gary Reilly, John Flanagan
Simon takes steps to stop Debbie and Jenny borrowing his clothes.
Knocked Off	118	HDA3-040	15 November 1989	Kevin Burston	Kym Goldsworthy, Ian Rochford
Debbie looks forward to finally becoming mobile.
You May Quote Me	119	HDA3-041	31 January 1990	Sally Brady	Gary Reilly, John Flanagan
Martin lets Simon and Nudge have a look at the plumbing.
The Fax of Life	120	HDA3-042	7 February 1990	Sally Brady	Gary Reilly, John Flanagan
A series of strange fax messages attracts Betty's interest. Guest starring Kate Morris as Katie.
Scratch My Back	121	HDA3-043	14 February 1990	Sally Brady	Gary Reilly, John Flanagan
The entire household gets struck down with chicken pox. Guest starring Joanne Samuel as Jeanette Taylor.
Debbie Does Taurus	122	HDA3-044	21 February 1990	Sally Brady	Kym Goldsworthy, Ian Rochford
Debbie takes up astrology, and Martin decides to build a shed.
Type-casting	123	HDA3-045	28 February 1990	Sally Brady	Gary Reilly, John Flanagan
Martin replaces Betty with a new secretary. Guest starring Julie Haseler as Tina Morris.
Doctor Betty I Presume	124	HDA3-046	7 March 1990	Sally Brady	Gary Reilly, John Flanagan
Betty studies first aid, but her enthusiasm is overwhelming.
Welcome to Our Lovely Home	125	HDA3-047	14 March 1990	Sally Brady	Gary Reilly, John Flanagan
Nudge plans a party for the Kellys - at their own home.
Vive La Difference	126	HDA3-048	21 March 1990	Sally Brady	Gary Reilly, John Flanagan
Debbie is sick of being conservative and tries something new.
Love Stinks	127	HDA3-049	28 March 1990	Sally Brady	Kym Goldsworthy, Ian Rochford
Nudge has problems when he falls for his university lecturer.

== Season 4 (1990-1991) ==
The fourth season features Joanne Samuel's final appearance as neighbour Jeanette, and Naomi Watts' television series debut as Simon's girlfriend, Belinda. All Season 4 episodes were produced in 1990.

Title	Ep.#	Code	Airdate	Director	Writer(s)
Credit Where Credit's Due	128	HDA4-001	4 April 1990	Sally Brady	Gary Reilly, John Flanagan
Nudge gets a credit card, but sinks further and further into debt.
Power Crazy	129	HDA4-002	11 April 1990	Sally Brady	John Flanagan
Betty takes an assertiveness course, and Martin is stunned by the results.
Ask Me No Questions	130	HDA4-003	18 April 1990	Sally Brady	Gary Reilly, John Flanagan
Martin is tricked into appearing on a quiz programme. Guest starring Bill Young as Stan Hickey.
A Mind for Business	131	HDA4-004	25 April 1990	Sally Brady	Gary Reilly, John Flanagan
Betty announces her intention to improve her mind.
Nostradamus Nudge	132	HDA4-005	2 May 1990	Sally Brady	John Flanagan
Nudge thinks he has the power to see into the future.
The Bald Facts	133	HDA4-006	9 May 1990	Sally Brady	Gary Reilly, John Flanagan
Simon is concerned that he may be thinning up top.
Left at the Post	134	HDA4-007	16 May 1990	Sally Brady	Gary Reilly, John Flanagan
Betty suspects that she is really left-handed. Guest starring Moya O'Sullivan as Grandma Lois Kelly, and Joanne Samuel as Jeanette Taylor.
Seducer in the Kitchen	135	HDA4-008	23 May 1990	Sally Brady	John Flanagan
Simon attempts to make a meal from the Seducer's Cookbook.
The Donkey Vote	136	HDA4-009	30 May 1990	Sally Brady	John Flanagan
Elections for school council cause a division between Simon and Nudge.
Lovesick	137	HDA4-010	6 June 1990	Sally Brady	Gary Reilly, John Flanagan
Jenny finds herself the recipient of unwanted attention from the local paperboy. Guest starring Kevin Lester as Duncan.
Jobs for the Boys	138	HDA4-011	13 June 1990	Kevin Burston	Kym Goldsworthy, Ian Rochford
Martin takes on a job at an architectural firm and fires Betty. Guest starring Jim Holt as Brian Edwards.
Writing Wrongs	139	HDA4-012	20 June 1990	Sally Brady	Gary Reilly, John Flanagan
Martin hires one of Debbie's ex-boyfriends to do some plumbing work. Guest starring Zachery McKay as Peter.
If the Cap Fits	140	HDA4-013	27 June 1990	Sally Brady	Gary Reilly, John Flanagan
Betty wants a hard-hat so she can accompany Martin on building sites.
Time's Up	141	HDA4-014	4 July 1990	Sally Brady	Gary Reilly, John Flanagan
Betty has problems coping with a new clock.
High Flying	142	HDA4-015	11 July 1990	Sally Brady	Gary Reilly, John Flanagan
With help from Debbie, Martin tries to overcome his fear of heights.
Age Old Tradition	143	HDA4-016	18 July 1990	Sally Brady	Kym Goldsworthy, Ian Rochford
Betty's birthday is approaching, and Martin decides to have a party. Guest starring Bill Young as Stan Hickey.
All Washed Up	144	HDA4-017	25 July 1990	Sally Brady	John Flanagan
The installation of a dishwasher does not stop the family from arguing.
Game Set and Match	145	HDA4-018	1 August 1990	Kevin Burston	John Flanagan
Martin finds himself unwillingly coaching Jenny's netball team. Guest starring Kate Morris as Katie, and Lisa James, Emilie Eccles and Christie Rynan as the Netball Team.
Testing Time	146	HDA4-019	8 August 1990	Sally Brady	Gary Reilly, John Flanagan
Betty is stressed when it comes time to sit her trial HSC exams.
The Write Stuff	147	HDA4-020	29 August 1990	Sally Brady	Gary Reilly, John Flanagan
While cleaning Jenny's room, Martin finds her diary and reads it.
Eternal Quadrangle	148	HDA4-021	5 September 1990	Sally Brady	John Flanagan
Nudge and Simon go on a double date, but complications ensue. Guest starring Naomi Watts as Belinda.
The Nudge File	149	HDA4-022	12 September 1990	Sally Brady	Gary Reilly, John Flanagan
Nudge takes a stance against corruption, and jeopardises Martin's job. Guest starring Doug Scroope as Mr. Blunt.
What an Experience	150	HDA4-023	19 September 1990	Sally Brady	Gary Reilly, John Flanagan
Debbie does her work experience in the office under Betty's guidance.
Betty Had a Little Lamington	151	HDA4-024	26 September 1990	Sally Brady	
Betty asks the family to help her with the charity lamington drive.
Play It Again Sam	152	HDA4-025	3 October 1990	Sally Brady	Gary Reilly, John Flanagan
Martin takes it upon himself to find the family of a lost six-year-old boy. Guest starring Christopher Fare as Sam, and Ben Franklin as the Police Sergeant.
Bulk Bill Dill	153	HDA4-026	10 October 1990	Sally Brady	Kym Goldsworthy, Ian Rochford
Simon's inexpert reading of a medical book has him convinced he is dying. Guest starring Naomi Watts as Belinda.
Would You Buy a Used Half Car from This Man?	154	HDA4-027	17 October 1990	Robert Meillon	Gary Reilly, John Flanagan
Betty is duped into buying a half-share in the Volkswagen from Simon.
Out for the Count	155	HDA4-028	24 October 1990	Tina Butler	Gary Reilly, John Flanagan
Martin needs a blood test, but has to face his fear of needles.
Rating TV	156	HDA4-029	31 October 1990	Sally Brady	
When the Kellys are asked to fill in a TV ratings diary, Martin insists they only watch quality programmes.
Get Rich Quick	157	HDA4-030	7 November 1990	Sally Brady	Gary Reilly, John Flanagan
Nudge finds a way to get rich, and Martin takes on a work experience student. Guest starring Nana Coburn as Amanda Crisp. Note: This episode marks the first time the exterior of the Kelly house is seen in the opening credits.
Lucky Nudge	158	HDA4-031	13 February 1991	Sally Brady	Gary Reilly, John Flanagan
Nudge thinks that he has won the lottery.
Pedal Power	159	HDA4-032	20 February 1991	Sally Brady	Gary Reilly, John Flanagan
Martin finds himself challenged to a bicycle race against Betty. Guest starring Stephen Comey as Geoffrey.
Formally First	160	HDA4-033	27 February 1991	Sally Brady	Gary Reilly, John Flanagan
Jenny prepares for her first school formal, and Martin goes on a cholesterol-free diet.
Flickering Flame	161	HDA4-034	6 March 1991	Sally Brady	Kym Goldsworthy, Ian Rochford
Martin catches up with a former love. Guest starring Penne Hackforth-Jones as Kate Eastwood.

== Season 5 (1991) ==
The first of all remaining seasons to have 13 episodes. Highlighted as the final season of cast members Simone Buchanan (Debbie), Christopher Truswell (Nudge) and Moya O'Sullivan (Grandma). Rachael Beck (Sam) joins the cast. Features the first guest appearance of Matthew Krok (Arthur MacArthur) and a cameo by Hey Dad..! writer Kym Goldsworthy.

Title	Ep.#	Code	Airdate	Director	Writer(s)
Forget Me Not!	162	HDA5-001	13 March 1991	Sally Brady	Gary Reilly, John Flanagan
Nudge is hit with a cricket ball and gets amnesia.
Funnel Trouble	163	HDA5-002	20 March 1991	Sally Brady	Gary Reilly, John Flanagan
Martin and Debbie agree that it is time she moved out.
Think Pig!	164	HDA5-003	10 April 1991	Sally Brady	Kym Goldsworthy, Ian Rochford
Stan Hickey has money troubles and comes to the Kellys for help. Guest starring Bill Young.
Island of Work	165	HDA5-004	17 April 1991	Sally Brady	Gary Reilly, John Flanagan
Debbie finds getting a job is more difficult than she thought. Note: Simone Buchanan's final episode as a cast regular.
Breaker Breaker	166	HDA5-005	24 April 1991	Sally Brady	Gary Reilly, John Flanagan
Betty takes up a new hobby - CB radio. Note: Rachael Beck's first episode as Martin's niece, Samantha.
Mother Love	167	HDA5-006	1 May 1991	Sally Brady	Gary Reilly, John Flanagan
Martin's mother comes to stay to help look after Sam. Guest starring Moya O'Sullivan.
Cupid Strikes Again	168	HDA5-007	8 May 1991	Sally Brady	Kym Goldsworthy, Ian Rochford
The installation of a new burglar alarm causes nothing but trouble.
Small Return	169	HDA5-008	15 May 1991	Sally Brady	Gary Reilly, John Flanagan
Betty joins Neighbourhood Watch, and Nudge falls in love with Sam. Guest starring Matthew Krok as Arthur MacArthur.
Broadcast Buddy	170	HDA5-009	22 May 1991	Sally Brady	Gary Reilly, John Flanagan
Betty gets involved in a romantic entanglement over her CB radio. Guest starring Kym Goldsworthy as "Big Bad Bear".
Top Dad	171	HDA5-010	29 May 1991	Sally Brady	Gary Reilly, John Flanagan
Martin is nominated for Father of the Year. Guest starring Di Smith as Avril Connaught.
Watch My Lips	172	HDA5-011	5 June 1991	Sally Brady	Gary Reilly, John Flanagan
Betty takes up ventriloquism to enter a talent contest.
Having a Fine Time	173	HDA5-012	12 June 1991	Sally Brady	Gary Reilly, John Flanagan
Simon gets a speeding ticket and has trouble explaining it to Martin.
To Catch a Thief	174	HDA5-013	19 June 1991	Sally Brady	Gary Reilly, John Flanagan
Nudge sets out to catch the mysterious tracksuit burglar. Note: This is the final episode of cast regular Christopher Truswell. No explanation is given in subsequent episodes as to the whereabouts of Nudge.

== Season 6 (1991) ==
Features the debut of Ben Oxenbould (Ben Hubner) and the return of Matthew Krok (Arthur MacArthur), with guest appearances by Rebecca Cross (Karen). Also noted as Christopher Mayer's final season. Personal childhood photos of the cast members are now displayed in the opening credits.

Title	Ep.#	Code	Airdate	Director	Writer(s)
A Testing Time	175	HDA6-001	21 August 1991	Sally Brady	Gary Reilly, John Flanagan
Arthur MacArthur falls for an older woman - Sam. Guest starring Matthew Krok.
Best Laid Plans	176	HDA6-002	28 August 1991	Sally Brady	Kym Goldsworthy, Ian Rochford
Martin is persuaded by Jenny to accompany her on a school trip. Guest starring Rebecca Cross as Karen.
Teacher, Teacher	177	HDA6-003	4 September 1991	Sally Brady	Gary Reilly, John Flanagan
Simon unwittingly tutors the university football champion in maths. Guest starring Ben Oxenbould as Ben Hubner.
Kids Stuff	178	HDA6-004	11 September 1991	Sally Brady	Kym Goldsworthy, Ian Rochford
Martin is keen to teach everyone a lesson about borrowing things. Guest starring Matthew Krok as Arthur MacArthur.
Greener Pastures	179	HDA6-005	18 September 1991	Sally Brady	Gary Reilly, John Flanagan
Martin is surprised when his biggest client tries to poach Betty. Guest starring Ben Oxenbould as Ben Hubner, and Matthew Krok as Arthur MacArthur.
Numbers Game	180	HDA6-006	25 September 1991	Robert Meillon	Gary Reilly, John Flanagan
Jenny tries to change her life to fit in with numerology. Guest starring Ben Oxenbould as Ben Hubner, and Matthew Krok as Arthur MacArthur.
Phone Home	181	HDA6-007	2 October 1991	Robert Meillon	Kym Goldsworthy, Ian Rochford
To cut down on excessive phone bills, Martin gets a portable phone. Guest starring Ben Oxenbould as Ben Hubner.
Hell Driver	182	HDA6-008	9 October 1991	Robert Meillon	Gary Reilly, John Flanagan
Martin is concerned when Sam gets her learner's permit. Guest starring Ben Oxenbould as Ben Hubner, and Matthew Krok as Arthur MacArthur.
Betty Versus Hi Tech	183	HDA6-009	16 October 1991	Robert Meillon	Gary Reilly, John Flanagan
Betty and Arthur try their hands as typewriter technicians. Guest starring Ben Oxenbould as Ben Hubner, and Matthew Krok as Arthur MacArthur.
Council Clean Up	184	HDA6-010	23 October 1991	Sally Brady	Gary Reilly, John Flanagan
Martin tries to convince the household of the merits of cleaning up. Guest starring Ben Oxenbould as Ben Hubner, Matthew Krok as Arthur MacArthur, and Tayce Krok as Tessa MacArthur.
A Bit of Grease	185	HDA6-011	30 October 1991	Sally Brady	Gary Reilly, John Flanagan
Sam uses her feminine charm to improve her chances of getting a licence. Guest starring Ben Oxenbould as Ben Hubner, and Matthew Krok as Arthur MacArthur.
Happy Holiday	186	HDA6-012	6 November 1991	Sally Brady	Gary Reilly, John Flanagan
Arthur is upset at having to have a holiday at home. Guest starring Ben Oxenbould as Ben Hubner, Matthew Krok as Arthur MacArthur, and Rebecca Cross as Karen.
Crowded House	187	HDA6-013	6 November 1991	Sally Brady	Gary Reilly, John Flanagan
Life in the Kelly house proves too much for Simon and he moves out. Guest starring Ben Oxenbould as Ben Hubner, Matthew Krok as Arthur MacArthur, and Rebecca Cross as Karen. Note: Christopher Mayer's final episode.

== Season 7 (1992) ==
Marks the final series appearance of Bill Young (Stan Hickey). Added to the opening credits are Ben Oxenbould and Matthew Krok.

Title	Ep.#	Code	Airdate	Director	Writer(s)
Food for Thought	188	HDA7-001	12 February 1992	Sally Brady	Gary Reilly, John Flanagan
Stan Hickey comes to town with the aim of getting a job. Guest starring Bill Young.
Boarding Party	189	HDA7-002	19 February 1992	Sally Brady	Gary Reilly, John Flanagan
Stan finds a job that will keep him close to Betty. Guest starring Bill Young.
Let's Do Lunch	190	HDA7-003	26 February 1992	Sally Brady	Gary Reilly, John Flanagan
Jenny is upset when she finds that Ben has moved into Simon's room.
Jenny Come Lately	191	HDA7-004	4 March 1992	Sally Brady	Gary Reilly, John Flanagan
Jenny is in trouble when she gets home late from school.
Hooked on Stage	192	HDA7-005	11 March 1992	Sally Brady	Kym Goldsworthy, Ian Rochford
With no job prospects on the horizon, Sam tries being an actress.
Ben the Toy Boy	193	HDA7-006	18 March 1992	Sally Brady	Gary Reilly, John Flanagan
Martin's client finds Ben alluring. Guest starring Nikki Coghill as Yolande Le Clerc.
Break a Leg	194	HDA7-007	25 March 1992	Sally Brady	Gary Reilly, John Flanagan
Arthur is incapacitated after a skateboard accident. Guest starring Roy Billing as Dr. MacLean.
Hooked on Pan	195	HDA7-008	1 April 1992	Sally Brady	Gary Reilly, John Flanagan
Sam takes an interest in reincarnation.
Born to Be Wild	196	HDA7-009	8 April 1992	Sally Brady	Kym Goldsworthy, Ian Rochford
Sam starts dating a motorbike rider, and Ben wants to buy a car. Guest starring Christopher Gabardi as Steve.
Of Mice and Men	197	HDA7-010	22 April 1992	Karl Zwicky	Gary Reilly, John Flanagan
Betty feels it is time the office had some new equipment. Guest starring Rod Zuanic as Bruno.
A Star Is Born	198	HDA7-011	29 April 1992	Sally Brady	Gary Reilly, John Flanagan
Sam wins a talent contest, and Betty battles with her new computer. Guest starring Mark Owen-Taylor as the Reporter, and Kym Goldsworthy as the TV Cameraman.
A Most Holy Event	199	HDA7-012	6 May 1992	Sally Brady	Kym Goldsworthy, Ian Rochford
Sam and Jenny plan a night out on the town, and Betty finds religion. Guest starring Peter Gwynne as the Monsignor.
Tall Stories	200	HDA7-013	13 May 1992	Sally Brady	Kym Goldsworthy, Ian Rochford
Stan Hickey arrives from Walgett with his brother. Guest starring Bill Young as Stan Hickey, and Stephen Rae as Jack Hickey.

== Season 8 (1992) ==
No major cast changes. Final guest appearances of Nikki Coghill (Jolanda) and Rod Zuanic (Bruno).

Title	Ep.#	Code	Airdate	Director	Writer(s)
Nun the Wiser	201	HDA8-001	20 May 1992	Sally Brady	John Flanagan
Betty becomes sick and is visited by Sister Maureen from Walgett. Guest starring Maggie Kirkpatrick.
The Big League	202	HDA8-002	27 May 1992	Sally Brady	Kym Goldsworthy, Ian Rochford
Ben tries to join a professional football team.
Calling, Mr Kelly	203	HDA8-003	3 June 1992	Sally Brady	John Flanagan
Martin agrees to be proxy in a wedding taking place over radio from the Antarctic. Guest starring Nikki Coghill as Yolande Le Clerc.
Waste Not, Want Not	204	HDA8-004	10 June 1992	Sally Brady	Gary Reilly, John Flanagan
The Kelly household participates in the 40 Hour Famine.
Read and Weep	205	HDA8-005	12 August 1992	Sally Brady	Gary Reilly, John Flanagan
Ben tries to hide his new puppy and Jenny hides her report card.
Second-Best Man	206	HDA8-006	17 June 1992	Leigh Spence	Kym Goldsworthy, Ian Rochford
Ben acts as best man for a friend, and Martin feels neglected on his birthday.
Governor Phillip Would Be Proud	207	HDA8-007	24 June 1992	Leigh Spence	John Flanagan
Martin is sick of modern technology, and reverts to more primitive methods.
Marlin Kelly	208	HDA8-008	1 July 1992	Leigh Spence	Kym Goldsworthy, Ian Rochford
Martin takes up sailing, and Ben teaches Arthur how to fish.
Volvo Power	209	HDA8-009	8 July 1992	Leigh Spence	Kym Goldsworthy, Ian Rochford
Martin decides to take the plunge and sell the family Volvo.
Hell's Betty	210	HDA8-010	15 July 1992	Leigh Spence	Kym Goldsworthy, Ian Rochford
Betty takes a course to improve her motorcycling skills.
Not Lasagna, Again!	211	HDA8-011	22 July 1992	Leigh Spence	John Flanagan
Martin has trouble finding variety when cooking for the family.
Arthur McArthur, P.I.	212	HDA8-012	19 August 1992	Leigh Spence	Kym Goldsworthy, Ian Rochford
The intrepid detective investigates The Case of the Overdue Parking Ticket. Guest starring Richard Carter as the Policeman.
Be Prepared	213	HDA8-013	26 August 1992	Leigh Spence	John Flanagan
Betty joins the Girl Guides as a troupe leader. Guest starring Rod Zuanic as Bruno.

== Season 9 (1992) ==
Beth Champion (Shelley) debuts as Sam's friend. Highlighted by brief guest appearances from Joe Bugner and John O'Connell.

Title	Ep.#	Code	Airdate	Director	Writer(s)
Notorious Character	214	HDA9-001	2 September 1992	Sally Brady	Kym Goldsworthy, Ian Rochford
Martin finds some dubious ancestry when researching his family tree. Guest starring Beth Champion as Shelley.
One Strike ...	215	HDA9-002	9 September 1992	Leigh Spence	Gary Reilly, John Flanagan
Arthur gets self-defence lessons from a former heavyweight boxing champion. Guest starring Khuarnrurthai Thammakij as the Sponsored Child, and Joe Bugner as himself.
An Alternative Solution	216	HDA9-003	16 September 1992	Sally Brady	
Betty takes an interest in alternative therapies and Jenny decides to be more mature.
Shall I Compare Thee ...	217	HDA9-004	23 September 1992	Leigh Spence	John Flanagan
Ben tries to write romantic poetry to woo his girlfriend.
Go for Gold	218	HDA9-005	30 September 1992	Leigh Spence	Kym Goldsworthy, Ian Rochford
Betty enters the Secretaries' Olympics and drives Martin mad with her training.
Seize the Day	219	HDA9-006	7 October 1992	Sally Brady	Kym Goldsworthy, Ian Rochford
Martin is the organiser of his old school reunion. Guest starring Barry Langrishe as Tony Andrews.
Holy Molar!	220	HDA9-007	14 October 1992	Sally Brady	Gary Reilly, John Flanagan
Martin is reduced to a nervous wreck when he has to visit the dentist. Guest starring Doug Scroope as Mr. Blunt.
Bargain Bonanza	221	HDA9-008	21 October 1992	Sally Brady	Kym Goldsworthy, Ian Rochford
Ben tries to find a gift to impress his girlfriend. Guest starring Beth Champion as Shelley.
To Catch a Mouse	222	HDA9-009	28 October 1992	Sally Brady	Gary Reilly, John Flanagan
The house is infested with mice, and everyone has their own solution. Note: Monte the Python appears courtesy of Featherdale Wildlife Park.
Brace Yourself	223	HDA9-010	4 November 1992	Sally Brady	Kym Goldsworthy, Ian Rochford
Jenny soon tires of wearing her orthodontic braces.
Wascally White Wabbit	224	HDA9-011	11 November 1992	Sally Brady	Gary Reilly, John Flanagan
Arthur gets a part in a school play as a white rabbit. Guest starring Beth Champion as Shelley.
Break a Leg (II)	225	HDA9-012	18 November 1992	Sally Brady	
Betty comes to grief while running for the bus.
Strictly Garland	226	HDA9-013	25 November 1992	Sally Brady	John Flanagan
Sam tries to get a part in a play produced by the choreographer of Strictly Ballroom. Guest starring John O'Connell as himself.

== Season 10 (1993) ==
Sarah Monahan leaves the series, and is replaced with Angela Keep as Jenny. Mary-Lou Stewart (Lyn) becomes a semi-regular on the show. Season 10 also features the introduction of the Woodlocks, and the television debut of a young Delta Goodrem (Cynthia).

Title	Ep.#	Code	Airdate	Director	Writer(s)
Picture This	227	HDA10-001	10 February 1993	Sally Brady	John Flanagan
Jenny leaves to go to boarding school. Note: Sarah Monahan's final episode as Jenny.
The Loan Ranger	228	HDA10-002	17 February 1993	Sally Brady	Kym Goldsworthy, Ian Rochford
In order to buy a car, Ben tries to get a bank loan.
Who's Thor?	229	HDA10-003	24 February 1993	Sally Brady	Kym Goldsworthy, Ian Rochford
To improve her workplace skills, Betty takes a course in Swedish massage. Guest starring Beth Champion as Shelley.
The Real Ladies Man	230	HDA10-004	3 March 1993	Sally Brady	Gary Reilly, John Flanagan
Arthur is horrified when he finds he is expected to take a girl to a party. Guest starring Delta Goodrem as Cynthia Broadhurst.
Easter Blues	231	HDA10-005	10 March 1993	Sally Brady	John Flanagan
Jenny wants to leave boarding school, and Ben and Sam give real eggs for Easter. Note: Angela Keep's first episode as Jenny.
Fishy Business	232	HDA10-006	17 March 1993	Sally Brady	Kym Goldsworthy, Ian Rochford
Martin is struck down with a virus and leaves Betty in charge of the office. Guest starring Betty Lucas as R.J. Thomas.
All Systems Down	233	HDA10-007	24 March 1993	Sally Brady	Gary Reilly, John Flanagan
The hot water service fails just when Martin has a blind date. Guest starring Mary-Lou Stewart as Lyn Parker, Laura Gabriel as Ros Woodlock, and Peter Braunstein as Dave Woodlock.
A New Look	234	HDA10-008	31 March 1993	Sally Brady	John Flanagan
Betty breaks Martin's glasses, and he replaces them with contact lenses.
The Dutiful Parent	235	HDA10-009	7 April 1993	Sally Brady	Gary Reilly, John Flanagan
Everyone pitches in to try and guess the password on Betty's computer.
Advance Australia ... What?	236	HDA10-010	14 April 1993	Sally Brady	Gary Reilly, John Flanagan
No one can help Jenny find the words to the National Anthem. Guest starring Mary-Lou Stewart as Lyn Parker, and Kym Goldsworthy as the voice of Justin the Security Guard.
TV or Not TV	237	HDA10-011	21 April 1993	Sally Brady	Kym Goldsworthy, Ian Rochford
Martin bets the girls they cannot go without television for a week.
Caught Bear Handed	238	HDA10-012	28 April 1993	Sally Brady	Gary Reilly, John Flanagan
Betty joins Neighbourhood Watch and Arthur's teddy bear secret is explained.
Surprise! Surprise!	239	HDA10-013	5 May 1993	Sally Brady	Gary Reilly, John Flanagan
Martin is planning a surprise party which Betty thinks is for her. Guest starring Mary-Lou Stewart as Lyn Parker, Laura Gabriel as Ros Woodlock, and Peter Braunstein as Dave Woodlock.

== Season 11 (1993) ==
No major cast changes. Brief guest appearances by Stan Grant, Ray Meagher and James Morrison.

Title	Ep.#	Code	Airdate	Director	Writer(s)
Gnome Alone	240	HDA11-001	12 May 1993	Sally Brady	Gary Reilly, John Flanagan
Sam and Ben find a replacement when Betty's garden gnome Nigel is stolen. Guest starring Stan Grant as himself.
Weekend Travellers	241	HDA11-002	19 May 1993	Sally Brady	Kym Goldsworthy, Ian Rochford
Martin wants to spend a weekend away with Lyn, but thinks Jenny will object. Guest starring Mary-Lou Stewart as Lyn Parker.
Fright Night II	242	HDA11-003	26 May 1993	Sally Brady	Kym Goldsworthy, Ian Rochford
Jenny has a slumber party, and Martin, Ben and Betty want to go fishing.
Star Struck	243	HDA11-004	2 June 1993	Sally Brady	Gary Reilly, John Flanagan
Ben and Sam audition for Home and Away, and Arthur joins the cricket team. Guest starring Ray Meagher as himself.
A Family Business	244	HDA11-005	9 June 1993	Sally Brady	Kym Goldsworthy
Arthur gets a job with Martin, and Sam and Lyn argue over a blouse. Guest starring Mary-Lou Stewart as Lyn Parker.
Super Scam	245	HDA11-006	16 June 1993	Sally Brady	John Flanagan
Jenny cleans up the family when she starts a swear box.
What Are You Doing Here ... Monsieur?	246	HDA11-007	23 June 1993	Leigh Spence	John Flanagan
Ben and Sam take jobs at a French restaurant without telling Martin. Guest starring Mary-Lou Stewart as Lyn Parker.
Working for the Man	247	HDA11-008	30 June 1993	Leigh Spence	Kym Goldsworthy, Ian Rochford
Martin hires Ben, but soon has cause to regret it.
Breaking Up Is Hard to Do	248	HDA11-009	7 July 1993	Leigh Spence	Gary Reilly, John Flanagan
Martin and Lyn decide to spend some time apart. Guest starring Mary-Lou Stewart as Lyn Parker, and Laura Gabriel as Ros Woodlock.
Justice of the Waterbed	249	HDA11-010	14 July 1993	Leigh Spence	Kym Goldsworthy, Ian Rochford
Ben wins a leaky waterbed, and Betty and Sam go into business together.
Such Sweet Music	250	HDA11-011	21 July 1993	Leigh Spence	Gary Reilly, John Flanagan
Betty joins a marching band and gets tuition from "Mr. Morrison". Guest starring James Morrison as himself.
A Case of the Grumps	251	HDA11-012	28 July 1993	Leigh Spence	Kym Goldsworthy, Ian Rochford
Martin is grumpy after breaking up with Lyn, and Sam feels old at 19. Guest starring Mary-Lou Stewart as Lyn Parker.
Just Call Me Akela!	252	HDA11-013	4 August 1993	Leigh Spence	John Flanagan
Jenny sells copies of her homework, and Ben helps Arthur with scouts.

== Season 12 (1993-1994) ==
Final season of Robert Hughes (Martin Kelly) and Mary-Lou Stewart (Lyn). Mark Owen-Taylor (Greg Russell) joins the cast towards the end of the season.

Title	Ep.#	Code	Airdate	Director	Writer(s)
A Fight for Women's Rights	253	HDA12-001	15 September 1993	Sally Brady	
Martin thinks Lyn is pregnant, and Jenny takes on the feminist cause. Guest starring Mary-Lou Stewart as Lyn Parker.
Bop Till You Drop	254	HDA12-002	22 September 1993	Sally Brady	
Sam enters a beauty contest, and finds herself competing against Arthur.
Housesitter	255	HDA12-003	29 September 1993	Sally Brady	
Lyn looks after the house for the weekend while Martin goes to Canberra on business. Guest starring Mary-Lou Stewart as Lyn Parker.
Whale Song Betty	256	HDA12-004	6 October 1993	Sally Brady	
Betty brings a tape of whale songs to work to improve her efficiency.
Ben's Lucky Fishing Hat	257	HDA12-005	13 October 1993	Sally Brady	
Jenny is caught shoplifting, and Arthur loses Ben's hat.
Jenny the Journo	258	HDA12-006	20 October 1993	Sally Brady	
Jenny's gossip column for the school newspaper includes an item about Sam.
Betty's Cryptic Crossword	259	HDA12-007	27 October 1993	Sally Brady	
Betty creates a more than usually cryptic crossword for a girl guide magazine.
Arthur the Good	260	HDA12-008	3 November 1993	Sally Brady	
Arthur tries to do more good deeds, starting with the Kelly household.
Strictly Business	261	HDA12-009	10 November 1993	Sally Brady	
Betty gets a proposal from the deputy town clerk. Guest starring Arky Michael as Neville Short.
Where's the Party?	262	HDA12-010	17 November 1993	Sally Brady	
Sam and Ben plan a party while Martin is away in Canberra. Guest starring Julie Haseler as Glenda the Bag Lady.
Bon Voyage: Part 1	263	HDA12-011	24 November 1993	Sally Brady	John Flanagan
Martin is not sure whether to accept a job which will take him overseas. Guest starring Mark Owen-Taylor as Greg Russell.
Bon Voyage: Part 2	264	HDA12-012	2 February 1994	Sally Brady	Kym Goldsworthy, Ian Rochford
Martin decides to take the job in Saudi Arabia. Guest starring Mark Owen-Taylor as Greg Russell, Mary-Lou Stewart as Lyn Parker, and Kym Goldsworthy as the voice of the Airport PA Announcer. Note: This is the final episode of original cast member Robert Hughes.
Settling In	265	HDA12-013	9 February 1994	Sally Brady	John Flanagan
Greg soon discovers what a unique person Betty is, and Ben gives Sam self-defence lessons. Guest starring Mark Owen-Taylor as Greg Russell. Note: Though he does not appear in the episode, Robert Hughes is credited in the opening title sequence for the last time.

== Season 13 (1994) ==
Belinda Emmett (Tracy) joins the cast, while Rachael Beck (Sam) departs. Simone Buchanan (Debbie) and Tayce Krok (Tessa McArthur) return for their final guest appearances. Added to the opening credits are Mark Owen-Taylor and Belinda Emmett.

Title	Ep.#	Code	Airdate	Director	Writer(s)
No Ordinary Woman	266	HDA13-001	16 February 1994	Sally Brady	John Flanagan
Sam is on vacation in Adelaide, and Greg's daughter Tracy drops in. Guest starring Belinda Emmett. Note: Rachael Beck is credited but does not appear during this episode.
This Is Your Wake Up Call	267	HDA13-002	23 February 1994	Sally Brady	Kym Goldsworthy, Ian Rochford
Tracy gets an early morning job training horses, and Sam phones Greg from Adelaide with money troubles. Guest starring Belinda Emmett. Note: Rachael Beck's final episode.
Nothing's Changed	268	HDA13-003	2 March 1994	Sally Brady	
When Debbie returns home, she is surprised at all the changes. Guest starring Simone Buchanan. Note: Belinda Emmett appears in the opening credits from this episode onward.
A Promotion for Betty?	269	HDA13-004	9 March 1994	Sally Brady	
Greg thinks promoting Betty to an executive position might be a good idea.
Walk Against Want Walkers	270	HDA13-005	16 March 1994	Sally Brady	
Betty designs a special tracksuit to help her in the Walk Against Want.
Who's to Blame?	271	HDA13-006	23 March 1994	Sally Brady	Kym Goldsworthy, Ian Rochford
Both Greg and Jenny crash the Volvo, but neither wants to take responsibility.
Cousin Coral Comes to Visit	272	HDA13-007	30 March 1994	Sally Brady	John Flanagan
A visit from Betty's cousin only adds confusion to the Kelly house. Guest starring Emma Jane Fowler as Cousin Coral.
Betty's Mother Comes to Town	273	HDA13-008	6 April 1994	Sally Brady	John Flanagan
Betty's mother is concerned about Greg, and comes to check him out. Note: Mrs. Paula Wilson is portrayed by Julie McGregor.
Acting the Goat!	274	HDA13-009	20 April 1994	Sally Brady	Kym Goldsworthy, Ian Rochford
Tracy accompanies Ben to his university dinner and dance. Guest starring Billy the Goat as Franklin the Goat.
It Was a Dark and Stormy Night	275	HDA13-010	27 April 1994	Sally Brady	Kym Goldsworthy, Ian Rochford
Greg hears a ghost story about a previous inhabitant of the house.
She Ain't Heavy, She's My Sister	276	HDA13-011	4 May 1994	Sally Brady	John Flanagan
Arthur is annoyed to find people think his sister is cuter than he is. Guest starring Tayce Krok as Tessa MacArthur.
Itsy Bitsy Teeny Weeny Yellow Sporty Car Machiney	277	HDA13-012	11 May 1994	Sally Brady	Kym Goldsworthy, Ian Rochford
When Greg wins a sports car, Ben and Tracy think they will be able to use it.
Beam Me Up Bennie	278	HDA13-013	18 May 1994	Sally Brady	Kym Goldsworthy, Ian Rochford
Ben's secret past is revealed - he's a closet Star Trek fan.

== Season 14 (1994) ==
Barry Crocker makes a guest appearance as Greg's father (Charles Russell), and Christopher Truswell (Nudge) returns for the series finale curtain call.

Title	Ep.#	Code	Airdate	Director	Writer(s)
Born to Be Mild	279	HDA14-001	25 May 1994	Sally Brady	
Greg wants to buy a motorbike, and Tracy tries to talk him out of it.
Rebel Without a Clue	280	HDA14-002	1 June 1994	Sally Brady	Ian Rochford
The household is surprised when Jenny reveals that she has a boyfriend. Guest starring Ryan Kwanten as Richard.
Your Wish Is My Command	281	HDA14-003	8 June 1994	Sally Brady	Kym Goldsworthy
Arthur is fed up acting as Ben and Tracy's slave, and plots revenge.
The Joy Luck Social Club	282	HDA14-004	15 June 1994	Sally Brady	Kym Goldsworthy, Ian Rochford
Betty invites a special guest to the office social party. Guest starring Julie Haseler as Glenda the Bag Lady.
Romancing the Stunned	283	HDA14-005	22 June 1994	Sally Brady	John Flanagan
Ben tries to avoid an ex-girlfriend. Guest starring Cathy Godbold as Cassie.
Betty's New Flat	284	HDA14-006	29 June 1994	Sally Brady	Kym Goldsworthy, Ian Rochford
Betty moves to a new flat, but all her belongings end up in Queensland.
Cart Blanks	285	HDA14-007	6 July 1994	Sally Brady	Geoff Stevenson
Greg invites Tracy's boyfriend to dinner, not knowing that he is 30. Guest starring Rhett Walton as Justin.
Sink or Swim	286	HDA14-008	13 July 1994	Sally Brady	John Flanagan
In an attempt to rid the house of fleas, Ben uses a powerful insecticide bomb.
Current Events	287	HDA14-009	20 July 1994	Sally Brady	Kym Goldsworthy, Ian Rochford
Tracy takes on the conservation cause, and Greg gets a new credit card.
Broom and Board	288	HDA14-010	27 July 1994	Sally Brady	Jimmy Thomson, Steve Myhill
Greg wants the house cleaned up and introduces a work roster.
Phoning at the Mouth	289	HDA14-011	3 August 1994	Sally Brady	Kym Goldsworthy, Ian Rochford
Greg is unsure whether he should buy Tracy a mobile phone.
Hoot's Boots	290	HDA14-012	10 August 1994	Sally Brady	Kym Goldsworthy, Ian Rochford
Greg is shocked at the changes in his father. Guest starring Barry Crocker as Charles Russell.
What a Blast! (Finale)	291	HDA14-013	17 August 1994	Sally Brady	John Flanagan
The household is taken hostage by a bank robber and held at gunpoint. Guest starring Bill Conn as the bank robber. Note: All former key cast members were asked to return for the final episode, but some refused. Joining the cast for the final curtain call, shown during the end credits, are Christopher Truswell, Sarah Monahan, Gary Reilly and John Flanagan. The final draft script for episode 291 states that the production date was 22 July 1994.
