= Angelo D'Angelo (actor) =

Australian actor

- Education: National Institute of Dramatic Art (1986–1989)
- Occupation: Actor
- Years active: 1983–2021
- Notable work: BMX Bandits (1983); The Big Steal (1990)

Angelo D'Angelo is an Australian actor, known for his roles in the films BMX Bandits, and The Big Steal.

== Early life and education ==
In 1986 D'Angelo was accepted into National Institute of Dramatic Art (NIDA), appearing in their 1989 graduating staging of Too Young for Ghosts at Parade Theatre.

== Career ==
D'Angelo has appeared in several films, including a feature role as PJ in 1983 crime comedy action film BMX Bandits, alongside Nicole Kidman and a supporting role as sidekick Vangeli in 1990 comedy The Big Steal, opposite Ben Mendelsohn, Damon Herriman and Steve Bisley. He also featured in two Monica Pellizzari shorts, Velo Nero and No, No, Nonno!, as part of her A Slice of Aussie Pizza trilogy.

D'Angelo has appeared in numerous television series, including playing the regular roles of Angelo Vitale in drama series Return to Eden in 1986 and Marc Rosetti in Law of the Land from 1993 to 1994. He later played the recurring role of Gino Poletti's father, Amo, in period drama series A Place to Call Home from 2013 to 2014. He made guest appearances as two characters in soap opera A Country Practice and had a guest role in the "Piccolo Mondo" episode of anthology series Six Pack.

D'Angelo's stage credits include The Shifting Heart (Phillip Street Theatre, 1984), King Lear (The Wharf, 1991), The Diver (Belvoir St Theatre, 1991) and Much Ado About Nothing (Sydney Opera House, 1992).

== Filmography ==
=== Film ===
Year	Title	Role	Notes	Ref.
1983	Molly	Circus audience member (uncredited)		
1983	BMX Bandits	PJ		
1984	Fast Talking	Scott Harris		
1985	The Coca-Cola Kid	Projectionist		
1985	Emoh Ruo (aka House Broken)	Surfer guy		
1987	The Inquiry (aka L'Inchiesta)			
1990	The Big Steal	Vangeli Petrakis		
1990	Velo Nero		Short film	
1990	No, No, Nonno!		Short film	
1992	Road to Alice	Dimitri	Short film	
1996	Love from Guy	Guy	Short film	
2006	Kill Only This One	Marcello	Short film	

=== Television ===
Year	Title	Role	Notes	Ref.
1983	Skin Deep	Brad Miller	TV movie	
1984	Queen of the Road	Punk in disco	TV movie	
1984; 1991	A Country Practice	Paul Guiliani / Lorenzo Bellotti	4 episodes	
1986	Return to Eden	Angelo Vitale	22 episodes	
1992	Six Pack	Guilano	Episode: "Piccolo Mondo"	
1993–1994	Law of the Land	Sergeant Marc Rosetti	26 episodes	
1993; 1996	G.P.	Paul Caminito	2 episodes	
1994–1996	Heartbreak High	Rocco	9 episodes	
1995	Sahara	Guiseppe	TV movie	
1996	Pacific Drive	Travis	2 episodes	
1996	Water Rats	Peter Mills	1 episode	
1996	Flipper	Jose / Roberto	2 episodes	
1997	Fallen Angels	Lorenzo Mazzoni	2 episodes	
1998	All Saints	Damien Carr	Season 1, 1 episode	
2003	Home and Away	Ross Luhan	1 episode	
2003	Home and Away: Hearts Divided	Ross Luhan	Direct-to-video	
2013–2014	A Place to Call Home	Amo Poletti	10 episodes	
2021	IOMacho	Angelo	1 episode	

== Theatre ==
Year	Title	Role	Notes	Ref.
1989	Too Young for Ghosts		Parade Theatre, Sydney	
1984	The Shifting Heart		Phillip St Theatre, Sydney	
1988	Chekhov in Yalta	Maxim Gorki	NIDA Parade Theatre, Sydney	
1989	Major Barbara & Joking Apart		NIDA Parade Theatre, Sydney	
1991	King Lear	Cordelia	Sydney Olympic Park, Blackfriars Theatre, Sydney, Wharf Theatre, Sydney with STC	
1991	The Diver		Belvoir St Theatre, Sydney with Toe Truck Theatre	
1992	Much Ado About Nothing		Sydney Opera House with STC	
