= The New Adventures of Blinky Bill =

- Created by: Dorothy Wall (book)
- Starring: Ross Browning; Janet Ashelford; Alan Highfield; Robert Hughes
- Country of origin: Australia
- Original language: English
- No. of seasons: 4
- No. of episodes: 28

Production
- Executive producer: Judith Simpson
- Producer: Richard Smith
- Running time: 26

Original release
- Network: ABC
- Release: 22 October 1984 – 18 September 1987

The New Adventures of Blinky Bill is an Australian-live action series that featured actors, interacting with puppets that ran on ABC Television from 1984 to 1987. After production ended, it remained on air in repeats until 1991. Twenty-eight 26 minute episodes were made and the producers were Judith Simpson and Richard Smith.

== Plot ==
The show was a follow on from the original Blinky Bill books by Dorothy Wall. Set in the fictional Bollygum National Park, characters include Blinky Bill, Mrs Magpie, Angelina Wallaby and Walter Wombat from the books, and new characters such as Charlie Goanna, Eric Echidna, Sybilla Snake and Kerry Bill Koala from the neighbouring fictional Acadia Ridge park.

== Main cast ==
| Actor | Character | Notes |
|---|---|---|
| Ross Browning | Blinky Bill, Eric Echidna | Ross appeared in an acting role as Max, a plain clothes ranger from Head Office. |
| Janet Ashelford (aka Janette Dalgliesh) | Angelina Wallaby, Mrs Magpie, Kerry Koala | |
| Alan Highfield | Charlie Goanna, Mr Wombat, Sybella Snake | |
| Robert Hughes | Ranger Barry | Portrayed the park ranger character Ranger Barry in the first two seasons. Gordon Poole and Alton Harvey also played ranger roles. Paul Williams as Ranger Ken in season 3 and Ben Franklin as Ranger Bob in Season 4. |

== Guest artists ==
Most episodes also featured at least one Australian actor as a guest actor in a human character role:

- Benita Collings
- Maggie Kirkpatrick
- Paul Chubb
- David Waters
- Jackie Woodburne
- Mike Meade
- Christopher Truswell as Bobby
- Joanne Samuel and many others

== Episode list ==
=== Season 1 (1984) ===
1. Hello Stranger, Goodbye Ranger
2. Ho-Ha at Bollygum
3. Musical Wares
4. Spaceship Shuttlecock

=== Season 2 (1985) ===
1. Stuck on Gumleaves
2. Frills and Feathers
3. High Water
4. Computer Capers
5. Mine Too!
6. Bikies from Outer Space

=== Season 3 (1986) ===
1. Rock 'n' Roll Blues
2. Legend in his Own Lunchtime
3. Times Flies When You're Feeling Young
4. Blinky Hits The Jackpot
5. Not a Minute's Peace
6. Twice Bitten
7. The Visitor
8. Food For Thought

=== Season 4 (1987) ===
1. Say Snake
2. Hot Wheels
3. A Time of Testing
4. Operation Gumdrops
5. Media Wars
6. April Fools
7. School's In
8. Brush With Danger
9. Horseplay
10. Diplomatic Relations

== Puppets ==
The series was unique for its production style. The puppets were designed and made by the late Beverley Campbell-Jackson, who chose to use a thick and fluffy yarn to knit the outer skin of the marsupial characters, which gave them their furry look on camera. Charlie's skin was made from a patterned lurex which gave him a distinctive look in sunlight. She designed internal mechanisms which used triggers to control the movements of each character's head, mouth and eyelids; while rods to each hand controlled arm movements. Each puppeteer used one hand for the trigger mechanism, and one hand to control both arm rods (this skill is somewhat like advanced chopsticks technique). Similar techniques are seen in some forms of Japanese puppetry.

== Production ==
At the time of shooting, the ABC network owned studios in the Sydney bush suburb of Frenchs Forest and the show was recorded using multi-camera and live sound recording on the back lot, with the puppeteers voicing the characters at the same time as operating the puppets. The only time that they would use one camera was the scenes with Blinky Bill and Charlie Goanna talking in Blinky's Tree. Ross Browning and Alan Highfield Blinky and Charlie's Puppeteers would bet on who could complete the scene the fastest. The Outside Broadcast unit provided crew, equipment and the control room. Some sets, including the ranger's hut and Walter Wombat's general store, were built permanently on location, while others were constructed as required for each episode. Sets were raised by a metre or so, to allow space underneath for puppeteers to stand or kneel. Only one scene – featuring a rock and roll performance by Blinky, Kerry and Charlie – was shot in a studio.

The puppet performers wrote roughly half the episodes. Other writers included Mike Meade (who wrote the pilot episode)Heather March, Mark Page and Morris Gleitzman, who is now a well-known author of children's books. Every time the ABC wanted to make another season, they had to ask permission from Angus & Robertson to shoot the next series of episodes.

In 1993, Blinky Bill returned to ABC television in the animated series, The Adventures of Blinky Bill, after which the ABC did not screen the puppet series again, a prospect that has become unlikely due to the conviction of Robert Hughes on sex offences.
