= Hampton Court (TV series) =

- Genre: Comedy
- Created by: Gary Reilly; John Flanagan
- Written by: Gary Reilly; John Flanagan
- Directed by: Sally Brady
- Starring: Danielle Spencer; Roy Billing; Julie McGregor
- Country of origin: Australia
- Original language: English
- No. of seasons: 1
- No. of episodes: 13

Production
- Producer: Gary Reilly
- Running time: 25 minutes
- Production company: Gary Reilly Productions

Original release
- Network: Seven Network
- Release: 30 May – 22 August 1991

Related
- Hey Dad..! – Season 5; Hey Dad..! – Season 6

Hampton Court is a 1991 Australian situation comedy series, produced by Gary Reilly Productions for the Seven Network.

The series was a spin-off of Hey Dad...! with the link being the inclusion here of actress Julie McGregor reprising her role of Betty Wilson. She continued to play that role in Hey Dad while this series was in production.

There are occasional cameo appearances by Hey Dad..! cast members.

== Synopsis ==
Four young tenants share a flat in a building named Hampton Court. Betty, who has left her old flat, moves in next door.

The various tenants struggle with domestic chores, coming up with the rent, and hectic social lives. They team up to keep the baby secret from their meddling landlord, Mr. Colloudos (Roy Billing), a Greek immigrant. Colloudos lives upstairs with his off-screen wife and their pet rottweilers, and enforces a strict no-babies rule in the building.

The tenants are single mother Lisa and her baby; chronic job-hopper Richard who is often behind on his rent; naïve but sassy Sophie; and fun-loving pub musician Trevor.

== Cast ==
- Danielle Spencer as Lisa Barrett
- Adam Willits as Richard Granville
- Maxine Klibingaitis as Sophie Verstak
- Rod Zuanic as Trevor
- Roy Billing as Mr. Colloudos
- Julie McGregor as Betty Wilson
- Sheila Kennelly as Mrs Verstak
- Penne Hackforth-Jones as Mrs Barrett

== Production ==
With the original working title of Hampton House, this series was recorded when Hey Dad..! went into hiatus at the end of its fifth season.

Seven Network executives had suggested the inclusion of Hey Dad..! character Nudge, but due to Christopher Truswell wanting to move on to other projects, he was not involved.

Rachael Beck screen-tested for the role of Lisa. She impressed the creators so much, they decided to cast her as Samantha Kelly on Hampton Court's parent show, Hey Dad..!.

The Hampton Court set was the same one used in another Gary Reilly sitcom, My Two Wives, with a different colour of paint, among other minor changes.

Only a moderate ratings success in its Thursday night time-slot against rival powerhouses The Flying Doctors and E Street, the program was not renewed beyond its initial series of thirteen half-hour episodes.

== Episodes ==
No.	Title	Directed by	Written by	Original release date
1	"Pilot"	Sally Brady	Gary Reilly & John Flanagan	30 May 1991
Betty finds a new home at Hampton Court. Due to no babies allowed in the flat, Lisa hides Sam from Mr. Colloudos. Guest starring Lucy-Anne Elliott & Simon Hill as Sam, and Miranda Otto as Melissa.
2	"Episode 2"	Sally Brady	Gary Reilly & John Flanagan	6 June 1991
The housemates borrow money from each other to pay their rent. Sophie's parents turn up and think Sam is Sophie's baby. Guest starring Lucy-Anne Elliott & Simon Hill as Sam, and Henri Szeps & Sheila Kennelly as Mr. & Mrs. Verstak.
3	"Universal Stewdios"	Sally Brady	Gary Reilly & John Flanagan	13 June 1991
Tired of having the food constantly hoarded, Lisa refuses to cook for Richard and Trevor. The boys decide to make red meat stew, though the results are far from appetizing. Guest starring Lucy-Anne Elliott & Simon Hill as Sam.
4	"Walking the Dog"	Sally Brady	Gary Reilly & John Flanagan	20 June 1991
Newly unemployed Richard offers to beat Mr Colloudos's rival at chess in exchange for his rent paid off. Mixups happen as babysitter Trev leaves Sam in the care of Betty, who is already babysitting the neighbors' infant, Diana. Guest starring Lucy-Anne Elliott as Diana, and Simon Hill as Sam. Note: The only episode where both babies who play Sam are seen on screen together.
5	"Sophie's Choice"	Sally Brady	Gary Reilly & John Flanagan	27 June 1991
Richard offers to fix the plumbing as his rent payment. He plays dumb, getting Trevor to do all the repairs for him. Guest starring Robert Hughes as Martin Kelly, and Lucy-Anne Elliott & Simon Hill as Sam.
6	"My Mother My Self"	Sally Brady	Gary Reilly & John Flanagan	4 July 1991
The gang tidies up in preparation for Mrs. Barrett's visit. She stays in Trevor's room as he is in Newcastle with his band. Richard lands a new job. Guest starring Penne Hackforth-Jones as Mrs. Barrett, and Lucy-Anne Elliott & Alana Hopcroft as Sam.
7	"Shocking News"	Sally Brady	Gary Reilly & John Flanagan	11 July 1991
The electricity bill has doubled in the past month, so the housemates cut back on their power use. Richard offers to clean Betty's flat in exchange for her buying some of his Waylon products.
8	"Loony Balloony"	Sally Brady	Gary Reilly & John Flanagan	18 July 1991
Deleen is celebrating her 21st birthday. Richard wants to make her jealous by bringing Lisa along to the party. He has trouble finding someone to fill in for him as Loony the clown. Guest starring Rebecca Cross as Deleen, and Lucy-Anne Elliott & Simon Hill as Sam.
9	"Paterson's Curse"	Sally Brady	Gary Reilly & John Flanagan	25 July 1991
Mr. Colloudos announces a rent increase, but nobody wants to sign the new lease agreement. He seriously considers an offer from a developer, who wants to build townhouses on the property. Guest starring Peter Sumner as Max, and Lucy-Anne Elliott & Simon Hill as Sam.
10	"The Replay"	Sally Brady	Gary Reilly & John Flanagan	1 August 1991
Sophie misplaces Richard's Magpies tickets after cleaning. Stan arrives looking for Betty, but she's left for Walgett. Guest starring Bill Young as Stan Hickey, and Lucy-Anne Elliott & Simon Hill as Sam.
11	"Sam Enchanted Evening"	Sally Brady	Gary Reilly & John Flanagan	8 August 1991
Lisa doesn't want her date to know that Sam is hers. Richard is fired from his clown job. Guest starring Josh Picker as Geoff, and Lucy-Anne Elliott & Simon Hill as Sam.
12	"Glasnost"	Sally Brady	Gary Reilly & John Flanagan	15 August 1991
An electric fuse is blown and the girls attempt to fix it. Trevor causes chaos when he brings Russian band 'Death by Donkey' to stay at the flat. Guest starring Andrew Tighe as Nicolai, and Kym Goldsworthy as Yuri.
13	"Gambling Bug"	Sally Brady	Gary Reilly & John Flanagan	22 August 1991
Increasing gambling debts cause problems for the flatmates and Mr. Colloudos, while Sam's condition has Lisa concerned. Guest starring Lucy-Anne Elliott & Simon Hill as Sam.

== See also ==
- List of Australian television series
