= Robert Hughes (actor) =

Australian former actor and convicted sex offender

- Born: Robert Lindsay Hughes; 19 August 1948 (age 78); Sydney, Australia
- Occupations: Actor, voice actor
- Years active: 1975–2013
- Known for: Hey Dad..!, ABBA: The Movie
- Spouse: Robyn Gardiner
- Children: 1 daughter
- Status: Paroled
- Convictions: Two counts of sexual assault, seven counts of indecent assault and one count of committing an indecent act involving girls from 6 to 15
- Penalty: 10 years 9 months' imprisonment (minimum 6 years non-parole)

Robert Lindsay Hughes (born 19 August 1948) also billed variously as Bob Hughes and Robert Hughs, is an Australian-born British former actor who appeared in ABBA: The Movie and the television sitcom Hey Dad..!.

In May 2014, he was convicted of sexual offences against children and sentenced to ten years, nine months' imprisonment with a minimum non-parole period of six years. Following his release from prison in 2022, he was deported to the United Kingdom.

== Early career ==
Hughes first worked as a cadet journalist for The Sydney Morning Herald.

Hughes was briefly the bass player for the pop/country rock band the Flying Circus in 1967–1968, billed as Bob Hughes, before they had hits with the songs "Hayride" and "La La".

== Career ==
Hughes has acted extensively in Australian theatre, film and television. He was a Sydney Theatre Company company artist from 1981. His theatre roles have included The War Horse and Great Big Adventure Book for Boys. His television roles include Chopper Squad, Cop Shop, The Sullivans, Skyways, Tickled Pink, The Paul Hogan Show, Dick Emery in Australia, Love Thy Neighbour in Australia, Daily at Dawn, The Timeless Land, Kingswood Country, The Flying Doctors, Halifax fp, A Country Practice, Learned Friends, Prisoner and The New Adventures of Blinky Bill. His film roles include Cathy's Child, Fatty Finn, ABBA: The Movie (as a fictional disc-jockey seeking an interview with the band during their Australian tour) and Squizzy Taylor. Following this he played the lead role in Hey Dad..! from 1987 until leaving the series in 1993.

Despite having been the lead star for twelve of the show's fourteen seasons, Hughes did not participate in two Hey Dad..! cast reunions: on the television series Where Are They Now? in 2006, or a radio reunion on Brisbane station B105 FM in 2009. His absences were later revealed to have arisen from animosity between him and the other actors to the point that most of them refused to partake in the latter reunion if he was involved.

== Personal life ==
=== Allegations of sexual misconduct ===
In March 2010, Sarah Monahan alleged that Hughes, who then was living in Singapore, had engaged in inappropriate sexual behaviour on the Hey Dad..! set. Fellow cast members Ben Oxenbould and Simone Buchanan spoke in support of her allegations. On 29 March, police announced the creation of a strike force to investigate Monahan's claims. Monahan said she spent more than 35 hours testifying to police. In September 2010, six months after the allegations were published, it was reported that more than 100 people had been interviewed. Police had not yet spoken to Hughes and were weighing up whether a formal interview would take place.

In an interview broadcast on Channel Nine's A Current Affair on 14 March 2011, one of Hughes' nieces stated that he had molested her. Hughes' daughter rejected the allegations and questioned why these accusations had not been raised earlier.

A mother of a victim later said: "We first went to [New South Wales] police about Hughes in 1988 when my daughter was nine years old" and says she was told by the investigating detective "I've tried to get this guy but every time I do someone covers for him." NSW Police had interviewed Hughes about claims of sexual abuse as early as 1985.

=== Arrest and conviction ===
Hughes was arrested in London in August 2012, and the New South Wales government sought his extradition to Australia. He was granted bail and a hearing was held on 19 September 2012. At that hearing, Hughes indicated that he intended to return to Australia for questioning. After being extradited to Australia, Hughes was charged with 11 counts of child sexual abuse and released on bail.

His trial started on 10 February 2014, at Downing Centre District Court, where he pleaded not guilty to eleven charges. In April 2014, the jury found Hughes guilty of two counts of sexual assault, seven counts of indecent assault and one count of committing an indecent act. A final charge, relating to an indecent act with a child under the age of sixteen, resulted in a hung jury. No outcome was recorded in relation to this charge.

On 16 May 2014, Hughes was sentenced to 10 years and 9 months' imprisonment with a minimum non-parole period of 6 years. His earliest date of eligibility for release was in April 2020 at age 71. After sentencing, Hughes was sent to Goulburn Jail, where inmates doused him in human excreta (urine/feces) upon his arrival, despite his being in protective custody. Prison officials constructed a wall of wire screening to deflect further attacks.

Hughes appealed to the Court of Criminal Appeal, but was rejected on 21 December 2015. The court did, however, mandate that Hughes' prison physical abuse allegations be referred to the Minister for Justice and the Commissioner for Corrective Services. On 18 January 2016, Hughes lodged an appeal with the High Court of Australia, and the appeal was denied in 2017.

Hughes requested an international prisoner transfer to the UK, due to holding dual British-Australian citizenship. However, he later withdrew this application and instead renounced his Australian citizenship, meaning he would be deported to the United Kingdom once paroled or his sentence completed. As a result, the New South Wales State Parole Authority refused parole in March 2020 as he would be deported and not under supervision, thus presenting an "unacceptable risk to community safety". On 2 June 2022, Hughes was granted parole, to face deportation to the United Kingdom. On the morning of 14 June 2022, Hughes was released into the custody of Australian Border Force officers to ensure he would be flown straight out of the country.

== Filmography ==
=== Film ===
Year	Title	Role	Notes
1977	ABBA: The Movie	Ashley Wallace	
1979	Cathy's Child	Mike	
1980	Fatty Finn	Percy	
1981	Winter of Our Dreams	Martin Harris	
1982	Squizzy Taylor	Reg Harvey	
1996	Race the Sun	Judd Potter	
1999	First Daughter	Dan	

=== Television ===
Year	Title	Role	Notes
1975	Armchair Theatre	Tully's Lookout	Episode: "Tully"
1977	The Dick Emery Show	Various characters	
1978	Tickled Pink	Jethro	Episode: "Relative Air Pollution"
1978	Chopper Squad	The Photographer	Episode: "Happiness Is"
1978	Ripkin		Television film
1980	Love Thy Neighbour	Bernard Smith	7 episodes
1980	The Timeless Land	Capt. Kemp	3 episodes
1980	Home Sweet Home	Policeman	Episode: "Open House"
1981	Kingswood Country	Solicitor / Hamish McDingle	2 episodes
1981	Cop Shop	Bob Harvey / James Best	4 episodes
1981	Daily at Dawn	Gil James	13 episodes
1982	Deadline	Fletcher	Television film
1984	City West		
1984	Sweet and Sour	College Supervisor	Episode: "#1.7"
1984	The Great Gold Swindle	Brian Mickelberg	Television film
1984; 1987	The New Adventures of Blinky Bill	Ranger Barry	10 episodes
1985	Prisoner	Ram / Voice of TV Newscaster	4 episodes
1986	Return to Eden	Search Co-ordinator	Episode: "Fight to Survive"
1987	Flight into Hell		
1990	G.P.	Alan Dean	Episode: "For Richer, for Poorer"
1991	Hampton Court	Martin Kelly	Episode: "Sophie's Choice"
1983; 1992	A Country Practice	Tony West / Adrian / Andrew Baxter / Colin Warner	8 episodes
1987; 1994	Hey Dad..!	Martin Kelly	267 episodes
1994	The Ferals	White Ant	Voice role Episode: "Exam Fever"
1994	Halifax f.p.	Craig West	Episode: "My Lovely Girl"
1997	State Coroner	Dr. Nelson Grey	Episode: "Blood Sport"
1998	All Saints	Alan Fitzer	3 episodes
2000	Tales of the South Seas	Paul Cabot	Episode: "The Locket"
2000	Nowhere to Land	AFP Bill Ryan	Television film

== Discography ==
=== Albums ===
List of albums
Title	Album details
Martin Vs Betty – The Best of "Hey Dad..!" (with Julie McGregor)	Released: 1991; Format: CD, Cassette; Label: 7 Records (HDR 1991)
