= Alison's Birthday =

- Promotional artwork
- Directed by: Ian Coughlan
- Written by: Ian Coughlan
- Produced by: David Hannay
- Starring: Joanne Samuel; Lou Brown; Bunney Brooke; John Bluthal; Vincent Ball
- Cinematography: Kevin Lind
- Edited by: Tim Street
- Music by: Brian King; Alain Oulman
- Distributed by: Australian Film Institute; Filmways Australasian Distributors
- Release date: 26 December 1981
- Running time: 97 minutes
- Country: Australia
- Language: English
- Budget: AU$300,000

Alison's Birthday is a 1981 Australian supernatural horror film, written and directed by Ian Coughlan, produced by the Australian Film Commission, Fontana Films and the Seven Network, and starring Joanne Samuel, Lou Brown, Bunney Brooke, John Bluthal, and Vincent Ball. It follows a teenage girl who finds herself the subject of a sinister ritual planned to take place on her 19th birthday.

== Plot ==
Sixteen-year-old Alison Findlay, along with two of her female classmates, Chrissie and Maureen, play with a ouija board. During the session, Chrissie apparently becomes possessed by an entity claiming to be Alison's father, warning her that something bad will occur on her 19th birthday. Moments later, a bookcase collapses on Chrissie, killing her.

Nearly three years later, Alison has her boyfriend Pete accompany her home for her 19th birthday. Alison returns to the home of her Aunt Jenny and Uncle Dean, who raised Alison from infancy after her parents died in a car accident. Near their home, Alison discovers a large stone construct in the woods resembling Stonehenge. Uncle Dean tells Alison that the construct was built by the home's previous owner, who was an enthusiast of ancient history and astronomy. Later that night, Alison is awoken by a strange elderly woman she does not know. Aunt Jenny explains that the woman is Alison's 103-year-old Grandmother Thorne, whom she has never met.

Dean and Jenny take an immediate dislike to Pete and make numerous attempts to keep him away from Alison. However, Pete remains persistent in visiting her. To prevent him from returning, Dean and Jenny drug Alison, causing her to fall ill, and summon a fake doctor to diagnose her. The doctor prescribes that she stay home and avoid visitors. That night, Pete breaks into the home to rescue Alison but is stopped by the doctor and Dean, who subdue and drug them both. Jenny and Dean coach the inebriated Alison into telling the police that Pete has been stalking her, leading to his arrest.

After Pete is freed on bail the following day, he begins researching the details of Alison's parents at the library. With the help of his friend Sally, a freelancing astrologer with some education on the occult, he determines that Alison's aunt and uncle are in fact not her aunt and uncle at all, but members of a Celtic cult who kidnapped her from the hospital as a child based on her birth time, which was exactly 19:00 (7:00 p.m.). Pete surmises that Dean and Jenny plan to sacrifice Alison to a Celtic demon named Mirne, whose ritual number is 19. Pete and Sally suspect that Mirne inhabits the body of Grandmother Thorne.

Pete is accosted by members of the cult who attempt to kill him in an abandoned cemetery, but he manages to escape. Armed with his father's target-shooting pistol and a crucifix, Pete returns to Dean and Jenny's home that night to stop the ritual and finds Alison at the stone monolith in the woods along with Jenny, Dean and other supposed family members including Grandmother Thorne, all wearing druid cloaks. Alison pleads for Pete to throw the crucifix at the cultists to deter them. He does so and the two flee through the forest. In a clearing, Pete trips and falls, dropping his gun. Alison retrieves it, only to tell him that he was too late and the cultists had already completed their soul transference, resulting in Mirne inhabiting the young Alison's body while Alison's soul now resides in the infirm body of Grandmother Thorne. She then shoots Pete dead.

When police arrive, Dean, Jenny and the Mirne-possessed Alison assure them that Pete had come to Alison's party with nefarious intentions, planning to kidnap her, and accidentally died in a scuffle when his gun discharged. Given Pete's arrest the night before, detectives believe the story. After the police leave, Jenny and Dean visit Grandmother Thorne (now Alison) as she awakens in her bed. Alison is initially oblivious to what has occurred but screams in horror when she sees her aged hands and witnesses Mirne in her former youthful body, realizing that her soul has been transferred into the 104-year-old body of Grandmother Thorne.

== Cast ==
- Joanne Samuel as Alison Findlay
- Lou Brown as Peter Healey
- Bunney Brooke as Aunt Jennifer Findlay
- John Bluthal as Uncle Dean Findlay
- Vincent Ball as Dr. Jeremy Lyall
- Margie McCrae as Chrissie Willis
- Julie Wilson as Maureen Tate
- Martin Vaughan as Mr. Martin
- Rosalind Speirs as Maggie Carlyle
- Robyn Gibbes as Helen McGill
- Ian Coughlan as Dave Ducker
- Ralph Cotterill as Brian Healey
- Marion Johns as Granny Thorne
- Belinda Giblin as Isobel Thorne
- Brian Wenzel as Police Sergeant
- Bernard Lewis as Michael
- Lisa Peers as Sally Brown
- Brian Blain as Uncle Patrick

== Production ==
The film was shot in Sydney and other New South Wales locations, over three weeks in January and February 1979.

== Release ==
Alison's Birthday was released in Australia on 26 December 1981.

=== Critical response ===
Meaghan Morris of the Sydney Morning Herald deemed the film a "letdown" overall, but conceded that it was "well made, mildly entertaining, and occasionally funny."

The film was nominated for various Australian film awards, including one for "Best Performance For a Male" for Vincent Ball.

=== Home media ===
The film was released on Blu-ray in the United States by Severin Films in December 2021 as part of their box set "All the Haunts Be Ours", a compendium of various international folk horror films.

== Sources ==
- Shelley, Peter (2012). Australian Horror Films, 1973-2010. Jefferson, North Carolina: McFarland. ISBN 978-0-786-46167-7.
- Stratton, David (1980). The Last New Wave: The Australian Film Revival. Sydney, New South Wales: Angus & Robertson. ISBN 978-0-207-14146-1.
