= Gallagher's Travels =

- Based on: short story by Kenneth Cook
- Written by: Michael Caulfield
- Directed by: Michael Caulfield
- Starring: Ivar Kants; Joanne Samuel; Stuart Campbell
- Country of origin: Australia
- Original language: English

Production
- Running time: 97 mins
- Production companies: J.C. Williamson; Gallagher Productions
- Budget: $1.5 million

Original release
- Release: 1987

Gallagher's Travels is a 1987 Australian TV movie about an investigative journalist.

The plot has been described as a reporting team chasing an "animal smuggling ring through the wilds of Australia."

Filming took place in early 1986 at Tangalooma on Moreton Island in Queensland.

== Cast ==
- Ivar Kants as Gallagher
- Joanne Samuels as Sally
- Stuart Campbell as Goltz
- Jennifer Hagan as Maggie
- Francis Yin as Mr. Uen
- Sylvester Iwinski as Ivan
- Kym Lynch as Bartender
