= Angela Keep =

Australian actress

- Born: 1981 (age 44–45)
- Occupation: Actress
- Years active: 1993–2018
- Spouse: Ercan Ersan

Angela Keep (born 1981) is a former Australian actress.

== Career ==
Keep studied acting at the Australian Theatre for Young People.

Her television debut was on the sitcom Hey Dad..!. She played Jenny Kelly, taking over the role from Sarah Monahan, on the show for two seasons, from 1993 until 1994. In 1997, she starred in children's mini series, Spellbinder: Land of the Dragon Lord and in the drama Breakers (1998–99). Keep also appeared in Home and Away where she played Skye Patterson.

She has had minor roles in some films, including Garage Days, released in 2002 and in Ned, a comedy satire of the life of Ned Kelly, released in 2003. She has also had a guest role in the television series Beastmaster in the episode "The Minotaur".

Most recently Keep appeared in the Australian television drama series, All Saints, where she played Polly Spicer.

Keep now works as a real estate agent in Sydney.

== Personal life ==
Keep is married to Ercan Ersan, with whom she has a daughter Elvie Lake Ersan.

== Filmography ==
Angela Keep film and television credits
Year	Title	Role	Notes
1993–1994	Hey Dad..!	Jenny Kelly	61 episodes
1995	G.P.	Kylie Downing	1 episode
1997	Spellbinder: Land of the Dragon Lord	Susan	1 episode
1998–1999	Breakers	Cheree Walker	1 episode
1999	Monster!	Jill	Television film
2000	Beastmaster	Melora	Episode: "The Minotaur"
2001	Home and Away	Skye Patterson	6 episodes
2002	Garage Days	Shad's Assistant	Theatrical film
2003	Ned	Stacy	Theatrical film
2003	All Saints	Polly Spicer	2 episodes

== Video games ==
Year	Title	Role	Type
2018	Kingdom Come: Deliverance	Voice	Video game
