= Bruce Best =

Australian director and producer

Bruce Best is an Australian director and producer known for his long association with A Country Practice. He was also one of the first people to cast Cate Blanchett, putting her in the show Heartland.

Rachel Browne of The Sydney Morning Herald named Best "one of Australia's most respected drama producers".

== Select credits ==
- A Country Practice – director, producer
- E Street – producer
- Family and Friends – producer
- G.P. – producer
- Heartland – producer
- Law of the Land – producer
- Pacific Drive – producer
- Queen of the Road – director
