= Pacific Drive (TV series) =

Television series

- Genre: Soap opera
- Starring: Simone Buchanan; Mark Constable; Les Hill; Andre Eikmeier; Olivia Hamnett (1997); Rowena Wallace (1996); Steve J. Harman; Virginia Hey; Darrin Klimek; Peter Kowitz; Adrian Lee; Joss McWilliam Lloyd Morris; Ross Newton; Kate Raison; Danielle Spencer; Christine Stephen-Daly; Mouche Phillips; Libby Tanner; Erik Thomson; Melissa Tkautz
- Country of origin: Australia
- Original language: English
- No. of seasons: 2
- No. of episodes: 390

Production
- Executive producers: Graham Burke; Greg Coote; Nick McMahon; Kris Noble
- Producer: Bruce Best
- Running time: 60 minutes
- Production companies: Village Roadshow Pictures Television; New World International

Original release
- Network: Nine Network
- Release: 29 January 1996 – November 2001

Pacific Drive is an Australian television soap opera, which debuted on 29 January 1996 on the Nine Network. It was a co-production between Nine, Village Roadshow Pictures Television and American distributor New World International. Set in the Gold Coast, Queensland, Pacific Drive focuses on the lives and ambitions of a group of young people, most of whom live in the same apartment building. It was filmed at the Movie World Studios. 130 one hour episodes were initially commissioned and it aired twice a week in a 11pm time slot.

Despite getting 1.7 million viewers for its first episode at 9.30pm, within a few weeks the show was getting just 135,000 viewers in its regular 11pm timeslot. Most critics described it as rubbish but some changed their minds during the show's second season. The Sydney Morning Herald said it was "immeasurably improved in looks, acting and writing" while The Sunday Telegraph named it one of the 10 Best Shows on TV for 1997. Pacific Drive ended in December 1997. When it concluded, it was shown in reruns being in a late night timeslot for years. It was also repeated and edited to tone down its racier overtones for a daytime slot on Nine while they unsuccessfully lobbied to the Australian Broadcasting Authority for a daytime drama to count towards their local drama quota points.

The "final" episode was screened on 6 April 2000 before Nine realised a mistake had been made (when the first three episodes had been edited down into a punchier one hour premiere), so they eventually screened the last episode a year later as a one-off send-off. Had it aired without interruption, it would have taken just 18 months to complete its run instead of five years.

== Series synopsis ==
The series was conceived as a flamboyant, melodramatic soap opera and dealt with the lives of wealthy Australians living on the Gold Coast. Although criticised for being an Australian copy of the American soap opera Melrose Place, its outrageous storylines drew comparisons to Nine's early 90s drama series, Chances, and some critics described Pacific Drive as "...Chances on Vallium" – storylines included corporate scheming, various affairs, serial killers and a lesbian love triangle (the first on an Australian TV soap) – saw the series gain a cult reputation.

== Storylines ==
The soap opera opened with the murder of Sonia Kingsley and introduced all the characters via her murder investigation (the 4WD killer turned out to be her secret lover Adam). Daughter Amber Kingsley came to town and married her stepfather Trey in a bid to get her mother's fortune which was based around a radio station. But her bitchy ways pushed Trey over the edge and he snapped and became a serial killer, eventually murdering Callie, Sondra, Nick, Cameron and his sister-in-law Georgina. He was arrested while holding Amber hostage but was found innocent after faking multiple personalities and escaped the Drive with Bethany, only to electrocute himself while trying to drown her.

Pacific Drive was the first Australian drama to get its own website and the feedback from fans revealed that they loved some characters and loved to hate some others. One who didn't get a mention either way was Laura so writer Bevan Lee did a lookalike story but avoided the twin cliche. When doppelgänger Anna came to town coveting Laura's life (and her fiancé Luke who had been revealed to be Sonia's secret son and therefore another Kingsley heir), Simone Buchanan took turns playing both roles while her former Hey Dad..! co-star Sarah Monahan played her double in two-shots. Luke went in search of his real father, Bill Garland, but he killed himself when it was revealed he had been molesting his daughter Liza who died of an ecstasy overdose in Joel's nightclub.

When Rowena Wallace accidentally overdosed, scripts were hastily re-written for Mara's gay theatrical friend Marcus to continue her scheming. After she returned to the show but in need of more medical care, Mara was hit by a car and woke up with amnesia, now being played by Olivia Hamnett

Amongst all the bed-hopping, Zoe was the most active but only after she came out as a lesbian. Her girlfriends included Margaux, Dior, Sondra, Kay and Gemma before she fell pregnant and married Tim to keep him in the country (with TV Soap remarking that a lesbian and a prostitute marrying must be Australian TV's most bizarre wedding ever). The show's other great legacy amongst its many gay fans was Bethany learning she was HIV positive but when Nine changed the show's direction (preferring to screen it in daytime rather than late night), Bethany remarked how her combination therapies were working and Zoe settled down to wedded bliss with Tim, thereby bringing all edgy stories to an end.

The show ended with Bethany calling off her marriage to Grant when his newly recovered mother Mara began to interfere again. Anna, caught faking a pregnancy to Luke, told Dr Josh she was in love with him and promised she would try to curb her crazy tendencies. Tim died when fell foul of a drug sting gone wrong and Zoe told Martin she would never forgive him for organising the police operation. Amber quit her corporate lifestyle and drove in search of Brett, the former gigolo who had been married to her aunt whom she now realised was the love of her life.

== Cast ==
=== Original cast members ===
- Simone Buchanan as Laura Harris and her doppelgänger Anna Dodwell
- Mark Constable as Adam Stephens, the Kingsley family lawyer who is revealed to be Sonia's killer
- Andre Eikmeier as Rick Carlyle, a real estate agent, involved with Callie and later Bethany
- Steve Harman as Luke Bowman, lifeguard and Sonia's illegitimate son
- Darrin Klimek as Tim Browning, a Canadian who becomes a male prostitute
- Adrian Lee as Joel Ritchie, Amber's scheming boyfriend from the city, later involved with Bethany
- Joss McWilliam as Martin Harris, police detective investigating Sonia's murder, Laura's brother
- Lloyd Morris as Trey Devlin, Sonia's husband, a talkback radio host
- Kate Raison as Georgina Ellis, Sonia's sister
- Danielle Spencer as Callie Macrae, a paramedic and Zoe's best friend and crush
- Christine Stephen-Daly as Amber Kingsley, Sonia's bitchy, manipulative daughter
- Libby Tanner as Zoe Marshall, a lesbian who works for the Kingsleys
- Erik Thomson as Brett Barrett, a local gigolo involved with Sonia, Tom's mentor on the trade
- Melissa Tkautz as Bethany Daniels, a HIV positive model, involved with Rick, Adam and Joel

=== Later additions ===
- Rowena Wallace (1996) and Olivia Hamnett (1997) as Mara de Villenois
- Les Hill as Grant Crozier, Bethany's husband
- Peter Kowitz as Dr. Josh Michaels
- Katy Charles as Detective Angela Dickinson
- Rebecca McCauley as Samantha Daniels, Bethany's sister

=== Recurring ===
- Virginia Hey as Margaux Hayes, an American business woman, Zoe's first girlfriend
- Clodagh Crowe as Dior Shelby, Zoe's second girlfriend
- Brigid Kelly as Kay West, Zoe's third girlfriend
- Helen Dallimore as Sondra Westwood, Zoe's fourth girlfriend
- Katherine Lee as Gemma Patterson, Zoe's fifth girlfriend
- Arthur Dignam as Marcus, a gay theatrical agent
- Jason Langley as Jo, Tim's transgender friend
- Chris Haywood as Bill Garland, Eliza's father
- Ross Newton as Roger West

=== Guests ===
- Malcolm Kennard as Cameron Bridges (1 episode)
- Rebekah Elmaloglou as Eliza Garland (1 episode)
- Grant Bowler as Garth Stephens (1 episode)
