= Peter Kowitz =

Australian actor

Peter Kowitz is an Australian actor.

== Career ==
=== Film and television ===
Kowitz's television credits include: Prime Time, Richmond Hill, Rafferty's Rules, Chances, Pacific Drive, Water Rats, Big Sky, Halifax f.p., Wildside, Farscape, Murder Call, Grass Roots, All Saints, Supernova, and Janet King. His film credits include: Spook and TV film The Long Way Home.

=== Theatre ===
Peter Kowitz is one of Australia's most prolific stage performers. He has had roles in classics like Summer of the Seventeenth Doll, Who's Afraid of Virginia Woolf? and A Doll's House, as well as numerous Shakespearean plays.

== Filmography ==
=== Film ===
Title	Year	Role	Type
1980	Stir	Lewis	Feature film
1981	The Homicide Squad	Julian	TV movie
1984	Matthew and Son	Jerry Ashton	TV movie
1985	A Street to Die	Craig	Feature film
1985	The Long Way Home	Graham	TV movie
1987	Dear Cardholder	Furniture Man	Feature film
1988	The Clean Machine	Stewart Byrne	TV movie
1988	Spook	Stan Burton	Feature film
1992	Big Ideas	Mr Searle	TV movie
1997	Joey	Senator	Feature film
1999	Deflated		Short film
2008	Cane Cutter	Commentator (voice)	Short film
2013	The Fragments	Patrick	Short film

=== Television ===
Title	Year	Role	Type
1980	The Timeless Land	Gregory Blaxland	TV miniseries, 1 episode
1981	A Town Like Alice	TAA pilot	TV miniseries, 1 episode
1981	Cop Shop	Stuart Mackenzie	TV series, 2 episodes
1984	Carson's Law	Phil	TV series, 2 episodes
1986-87	Prime Time	Jim Donnegan	TV series, 1 episode
1986	Land of Hope	Leo Quinn	TV miniseries
1986	The Lancaster Miller Affair	Maddox	TV miniseries. 3 episodes
1988	Richmond Hill	Roger Lawson	TV series
1988	A Country Practice	Steve White	TV series, 2 episodes
1988, 1999	The Flying Doctors	Michael Bucknell / Bert Morgan	TV series, 2 episodes
1989	Bodysurfer	David Lang	TV miniseries
1990	Rafferty's Rules	Bernie Manders	TV series, 1 episode
1991	Ring of Scorpio	Gary Withers	TV miniseries, 4 episodes
1991	Chances	Steve Harland	TV series, 26 episodes
1994	Heartbreak High	Mack Winston	TV series, 2 episodes
1994, 1996	G.P.	Neil Hatton	TV series, 2 episodes
1996	Pacific Drive	Dr. Josh Michaels	TV series
1996	Water Rats	Marty Miller	TV series, 2 episodes
1997	Big Sky	Warwick	TV series, 1 episode
1998	Wildside	Nigel Burch	TV series, 3 episodes
1999	Halifax f.p.	Matthew Erhmann	TV series, S4 E2: Swimming with Sharks
2000	Farscape	Tarr	TV series, 1 episode
2000	Murder Call	Richard Nossiter	TV series, 1 episode
2002	Young Lions	Alan Destin	TV series, 1 episode
2000	Grass Roots	Warwick Marchant / Rev. Peter Summerhaze	TV series, 10 episodes
1999-2006	All Saints	Douglas Spinks / Ronnie Tucker / Jimmy Frankston	TV series, 3 episodes
2005-06	Supernova	Max Talbot	TV series, 12 episodes
2007	McLeod's Daughters	Bill Ward	TV episode, 1 episode
2009	City Homicide	Snr Sgt Paddy O'Connell	TV series, 1 episode
2009, 2010	Packed to the Rafters	Pat Bannon	TV series, 2 episodes
2010	I Rock	Andy Bang	TV series, 2 episodes
2011	Crownies	Tony Gillies SC	TV series, 2 episodes
2014-17	Janet King	Tony Gillies SC	TV series, 24 episodes

== Theatre ==
Title	Year	Role	Co./Venue
	Death of a Salesman		
	Summer of the Seventeenth Doll		
	Who's Afraid of Virginia Woolf?		
	A Doll's House		

== Awards ==
He has won two AFI awards – Best Lead Actor in a Telefeature for The Long Way Home, and Best Performance by an Actor in a mini-series for Body Surfer.
