= The Long Way Home (1985 film) =

- Directed by: Catherine Miller
- Written by: Stephen Sewell
- Produced by: Erina Rayner
- Starring: Richard Moir; Geneviève Picot; Peter Kowitz; Joanne Samuel
- Music by: Chris Neal
- Production company: ABC
- Release date: 1985
- Running time: 75 mins
- Country: Australia
- Language: English

The Long Way Home is a 1985 Australian film about two Vietnam veterans. It was the second episode on 1985's Sunday Australian Movies series.

== Cast ==
- Richard Moir as Bob
- Geneviève Picot as Robin
- Peter Kowitz as Graham
- Joanne Samuel as Julie

== Reception ==
Dennis Pryor of the Age wrote "The final outpouring of blood, guns and fire seems to go on interminably. It is the climax, but we have had many earlier crises that the final shoot-out is an unactable anticlimax. The smell of Victorian melodrama is overpowering as we keep cutting to Julie cowering in her clutching her two children and reciting Hail Marys. A pity. The Vietnam veterans endured a special kind of martyrdom. They were survivors who returned to be greeted not as heroes but as an embarrasment."

In the Age's Green Guide Maria McNamara says that "Early on, the script achieves a certain mounting menace, but this disipates towards the summit. The following climax is exaggerated and self-conscious." She adds that it "is still worth watching."

In the Sydney Morning Herald's Guide Bronwyn Watson wrote "The Long Way Home builds up to an awful climax, where the truth is finally revealed. It could so easily have failed but Millar and Rayner manage to carry it off. It's a disturbing movie."
