= Queen of the Road =

- Written by: Luis Bayonas
- Directed by: Bruce Best
- Starring: Joanne Samuel; Amanda Muggleton; Chris Haywood
- Country of origin: Australia
- Original language: English

Production
- Producer: James Davern
- Running time: 98 mins
- Production company: JNP Films

Original release
- Network: Seven Network
- Release: 1984

Queen of the Road is a 1984 Australian television film about two female truckies.

== Cast ==
- Joanne Samuel as Rosy Costello
- Amanda Muggleton as Gayle O'Reagan
- Chris Haywood
- Brian Moll as Al 'Herpie' Graves
- Jonathan Sweet as Max
- Angelo D'Angelo as punk in disco
