= The Roly Poly Man =

1994 film

- Australian poster
- Directed by: Bill Young
- Written by: Kym Goldsworthy
- Starring: Paul Chubb
- Release date: 1994
- Country: Australia
- Language: English
- Budget: under $1 million
- Box office: A$4,067 (Australia)

The Roly Poly Man is a 1994 Australian feature film.

== Production ==
It was funded through private investment, The Film Finance Corporation and the NSW Film and Television Office. Its budget was just under $1,000.000.

== Cast ==
- Paul Chubb as Dirk Trent
- Les Foxcroft as Mickey
- Susan Lyons as Sandra Burnett
- Zoe Bertram as Laurel Trent
- Frank Whitten as Dr. Henderson
- Peter Braunstein as Det. Tom McKenzie
- John Batchelor as Axel
- Rowan Woods as Prof. Wauchop
- Jane Harders as Jane Lewis
- Valerie Bader as Motel Manager
- Sarah Lambert as Vicki Lane
- Deborah Kennedy as Chantal
- Jim Pike as Tony
- Exploding White Mice as Thrash Rock Band
- Roy Billing as Sidebottom
- Barbara Stephens as Nun
- Kylie Jane Green as School Girl
- Bruce Venables as Security Guard
- Laura Gabriel as Nurse
- Marie Armstrong as Wife
- Bill Vince as Husband
- Robert Bruning as Garfield
- Tony Poli as Gary (billed as Toni Poli)
- Daniel Wyllie as Aggro Graffitist
- Dorothy Blayney as Intact Graffitist
- Jim Burnett as Ted Lewis
- Vic Andrews as Detective 2
- Alan Hornery as Bus Driver
- Paul LePetit as Barfly
- Alan Chappell as Elvis (billed as Alan Chapple)
- John Winter as Woozy Bear
- Kym Goldsworthy as Mr. Clocky
- Joanna Moore as Miss Rhonda
- Richard Morecroft as Newsreader

== Reception ==
Even though the film didn't perform well at the box office, it had a healthy life in film festival appearances, television sales, DVD, and sales to a number of international territories (Italy and South Africa).

It is one of the more unusual films made in Australia, as it combined schlock, critters, film noir and splatter to create an 'out there' type of comedy that appealed to a niche audience.

The film won the Vincent Price Award (Audience Award) at the XVth Fantafestival in Rome, Italy in June 1995. Other festivals it screened at include Mysfest (Italy) where it was nominated for Best Film, Durban Film Festival (South Africa), Vancouver Film Festival (Canada), Love and Anarchy Festival (Helsinki), Australian Film Festival (AFI), Bathurst Film Festival (Australia), Tromso International Festival (Norway), L'Etrange Festival (France), and Cycle du Cinema Australien (France). The film was nominated for a Best Original Screenplay at the 1994 AFI Awards.

The Roly Poly Man's director, actor/director Bill Young, co-directed the documentary A Very Short War.
