= Kym Goldsworthy =

Australian screenwriter and script editor

Kym Goldsworthy is an Australian screenwriter and script editor, best known for his work in television.

== Select Credits ==
- Hey Dad..! (1988–94) - TV series
- The Roly Poly Man (1994) - film
- Bullpitt! (1997–98) - TV series
- The Woodlies (2011–12) - TV series
