= Simone Buchanan =

Australian actress

- Born: Simone Louise Buchanan
- Occupation: Actress
- Years active: 1978–present
- Spouse: Brett Smith (m. 2008)
- Children: 2

Simone Louise Buchanan is an Australian film and television actress, and television director. She is best known for her television roles as Debbie Kelly in the situation comedy Hey Dad..! and Samantha Fitzgerald in the soap opera Neighbours.

== Early life ==
Buchanan's siblings Miles Buchanan and Beth Buchanan are also actors. All three appeared in the children's television show Secret Valley.

Buchanan's father later learned that he had a daughter from a relationship before he married Buchanan's mother. Buchanan's half-sister Rudie Chapman is also an actor and worked with Beth on Neighbours. The three sisters went onto star in a production of Crimes of the Heart together.

== Career ==
Having attended a drama and dance school along with her brother, the siblings were cast in the 1978 feature film A Good Thing Going. Buchanan went on to appear in a number of television series, including The Flying Doctors and Sons and Daughters, before she was cast in Hey Dad..!.

Buchanan has appeared in several films, including playing a rape victim in Shame, and as Laura Harris – and eventually Anna Dodwell – in the Australian drama series Pacific Drive.

In 2008, Buchanan played Samantha Fitzgerald, the bipolar-suffering estranged wife of Dan Fitzgerald (Brett Tucker), in the long-running soap opera Neighbours. Originally appearing for three months, from March to June, the character's introduction was considered a success, leading to her return for a second three-month stint from November to February 2009. The character appeared for a four-week guest role in late 2010, to coincide with the 6,000th episode celebrations.

Buchanan returned to the Neighbours set in 2018 as a director, after the series producer Jason Herbison asked her to do her director's attachment with the show. Buchanan also appears in the 2018 horror film Boar, alongside John Jarratt, Ernie Dingo, Steve Bisley and Roger Ward.

== Personal life ==
Buchanan has been married to Brett Smith since 2008. She has a son, Tane (born 1998), from a previous relationship. In August 2009, it was announced that Buchanan was expecting her second child, due in early 2010. The pregnancy was achieved with IVF treatment. Buchanan gave birth to a son, Rémy, via caesarean section.

In March 2010, Buchanan supported Sarah Monahan, a co-star on the Hey Dad..! television show, over allegations that fellow star Robert Hughes had engaged in inappropriate sexual behaviour on the set of the show. Buchanan claimed she had approached the show's producer about the alleged assaults but that he instructed her to keep quiet. She testified at Hughes' 2014 trial that she only heard allegations about his inappropriate behaviour and never saw it for herself.

== Filmography ==
=== Film ===
Year	Title	Role	Type
1978	Newsfront	Child	Feature film
1979	My Brilliant Career	Mary Anne	Feature film
1981	Doctors & Nurses	Jane Gilmour	Feature film
1981	Run, Rebecca, Run	Rebecca	Feature film
1982	The Mystery at Castle House	Kate	Feature film
1983	Platypus Cove	Jenny Nelson	Feature film
1984	Run, Chrissie, Run!	Cathy	Feature film
1987	Shame	Lizzie Curtis	Feature film
2004	Swimming to the Boy	Mum	Film Short
2005	Forced Entry	Julie	Film Short
2005	Push	Susan	Film Short
2006	End of Town	Mother	Film Short
2013	Patrick	Patrick's Mother	Feature film
2017	Boar	Debbie	Feature film
2021	The Possessed	Carissa	Feature film
2022	Girl at the Window	Christina Ellis	Feature film

=== Television ===
Year	Title	Role	Type
1978	A Good Thing Going	Cathy Harris	TV movie
1980; 1982	Secret Valley	Simone	TV series, 15 episodes
1982	Runaway Island	Jemma McLeod	TV movie / TV pilot
1983; 1984	Carson's Law	Rose Gunn	TV series, 2 episodes
1983	High Country	Debbie Lomax	TV movie
1984	Carson's Law	Melanie Creswell	TV series, 2 episodes
1984	A Country Practice	Sharon Barnes	TV series, 2 episodes
1984–85	Runaway Island	Jemma McLeod	TV series, 8 episodes
1985	The Flying Doctors	Lucy Daniels	TV miniseries, 3 episodes
1985–1986	Sons and Daughters	Donna Jackson/Palmer	TV series, 22 episodes
1987	Willing and Abel	Guest role	TV series, 1 episode
1987–1994	Hey Dad...!	Debbie Kelly	TV series, 167 episodes
1989	The Bert Newton Show	Guest - Herself	TV series, 1 episode
1991	A Country Practice	Sara Kennedy	TV series, 2 episodes
1991	The Main Event	Herself	TV series, 1 episode
1993	G.P.	Mickey Davis	TV series, 1 episode
1993	R.F.D.S. aka 'The Flying Doctors'	Rebecca Owens	TV series, 13 episodes
1994	English at Work	Herself	TV series
1995–98	Pacific Drive	Laura Harris	TV series, 389 episodes
1998	All Saints	Mitchie Bell	TV series, 1 episode
1999	Water Rats	Jenny Spiro	TV series, 1 episode
2000; 2003	Blue Heelers	Nurse Angie Cohen	TV series, 2 episodes
2003	Stingers	Cathy Pearson	TV series, 1 episode
2006	McLeod's Daughters	Amy Tanaka	TV series, 1 episode
2007	Where Are They Now?	Herself with Hey Dad...! cast	TV series, 1 episode
2008–10; 2020	Neighbours	Samantha Fitzgerald	TV series, 91 episodes
2008	9am with David & Kim	Guest	TV series, 1 episode
2010; 2011	A Current Affair	Herself with Hey Dad...! cast	TV series, 1 episode
2014	A Current Affair	Herself	TV series, 1 episode
2014	Upper Middle Bogan	Kirby	TV series, 1 episode
2018	Boar: Bloopers	Herself	Video
2018	Boar: Director Chris Sun	Herself	Video
2018	Boar: Cast Interviews	Herself	Video
