= Ben Oxenbould =

Australian actor and comedian (born 1969)

- Born: 2 March 1969 (age 57); Adelaide, South Australia, Australia
- Occupations: Actor, comedian
- Years active: 1980–present
- Children: 1
- Relatives: Ed Oxenbould (nephew)

Ben Oxenbould (born 2 March 1969) is an Australian actor and comedian, known for his role as Ben Hubner in the sitcom Hey Dad..! from 1991 until 1994, and for being part of the ensemble cast of sketch comedy series Comedy Inc. from 2003 until 2005.

== Early life ==
Oxenbould was born to parents Bob and Jan, both actors, in Adelaide, South Australia. His older brother Jamie Oxenbould is also an actor, as is Jamie's son, Ed Oxenbould. Oxenbould was educated at North Sydney Boys High School.

== Career ==
In 1980, Oxenbould made his performance debut when he was cast as "Hubert 'Fatty' Finn" in the film Fatty Finn. He then appeared in several character roles and guest roles in several films and television programs, including E Street, Home and Away, and Echo Point.

After a guest role in G.P., Oxenbould was then cast as the character Ben Hubner in the sitcom, Hey Dad..! in 1991. He signed a three-year contract. In 1992, he appeared in the anthology series Six Pack. He plays Andy, a lodger who makes a married couple's lives miserable in the sixth episode "That Man's Father".

On 24 March 2010, Oxenbould appeared on Australian television programme A Current Affair to support claims of sexual abuse made by fellow actor Sarah Monahan. Oxenbould claimed to have witnessed another child actress being molested by a male cast member.

From 2003 to 2005, Oxenbould featured as one of the ensemble cast of the sketch comedy series Comedy Inc., in which he was noted for several characters, including his parody of cricketer Shane Warne. A review of Comedy Inc: The Late Shift published in The Australian in 2005 described Oxenbould's performance in the show as: "continu[ing] to display a gift for parody and a range that goes from high camp to seriously blue collar." He left the program in 2005.

In 2007 he starred in the film Black Water, a thriller set in the Australian outback and featuring a man-eating crocodile. In 2010 he appeared in the film Wicked Love: The Maria Korp Story, a film based on the true story of Maria Korp who was murdered by her husband's lover in 2005. Oxenbould has also done extensive work as a voice-over artist, as well as work in short films and theatre.

== Philanthropy ==
In 2000, Oxenbould helped set up the BBAS Memorial School, a school in Bardia, Nepal, a remote Nepalese mountain village. In 2005, he organised a fundraiser for the school, which was supported by Australian entertainers, including singers Tex Perkins and Tim Rogers, comedian Akmal Saleh. Artwork by the school's students was auctioned.

== Personal life ==
Oxenbould has a son, who was born in 1990.

== Filmography ==
=== Film ===
Year	Title	Role	Notes
1980	Fatty Finn	Hubert "Fatty" Finn	
1989	Mortgage	Young Couple 2	
1990	The Crossing	Heavyfoot	
1990	The Boys in the Island	Thrasher	
1997	Wanted	Joe	
1998	Radiance	The Barman	
2004	Get Rich Quick	Boaz	
2007	Black Water	Jim	
2010	Caught Inside	Bull	
2014	Emissary	The Man	Short

=== Television ===
Year	Title	Role	Notes
1989	E Street	Mario Agostini	season 1, episodes 21-22
1989	Home and Away	Hoon #2	season 2, episodes 423-424
1991	G.P.	Kerry Watson	"The Price You Pay"
1991–1994	Hey Dad..!	Ben Hubner	Main role
1992	Six Pack	Andy	Episode: "That Man's Father"
1995	Echo Point	Wacka	season 1, episodes 97-98, 100-103
2003–2006	Comedy Inc.	Various	TV series
2005	The Surgeon	Steve Glass	"1.8"
2008	Scorched	Lenny	TV film
2009	The Cut	Danny Holbrook	Main role
2010	Wicked Love: The Maria Korp Story		TV film
2011	At Home With Julia	Head Protester	"Code Ranga"
2011	Slide	Tony Carlyle	Recurring role
2012	Rake	Alistair Emery	"R vs Floyd"
2014	Old School	Mickey Rowe	"Sky the Towel"
2016	The Kettering Incident	Craig Grayson	Recurring role
2016	The Code	Nolan Daniels	Recurring role
2016	Deep Water	Chris Toohey	TV miniseries
2017	Wolf Creek	Ian "Davo" Davidson	Season 2, 2 episodes
2018	Mystery Road	Vince Pierce	2 episodes
2019	Mr Inbetween	Dirk	3 episodes
2022	True Colours	Gingerbread Man	4-part miniseries
2022	Heartbreak High	Justin McLean	5 episodes
