= Matthew Krok =

Australian former child actor

- Born: Matthew Krok; 8 March 1982 (age 44); Sydney, New South Wales, Australia
- Years active: 1990–2001

Matthew Krok (born 8 March 1982) is an Australian former child actor best known for playing the role of schoolboy Arthur McArthur on the Australian sitcom Hey Dad...! from 1991 to 1994. He also appeared in a popular Sorbent toilet paper advertising campaign at around the same time.

== Career ==
During the peak of his stardom in the early 1990s, Krok appeared as a celebrity guest on Wheel of Fortune and was also frequently referred to as "the little fat kid from Hey Dad...!". In an infamous The Late Show skit, "Arnold Schwarzenegger" (played by Tony Martin in heavy prosthetic makeup) jokingly revealed that the plot of the then yet-to-be-released Terminator 3 revolved around killing him and said, "Hasta la vista, little fat kid!".

Krok's other credits include the children's films Paws and Joey. His last credited acting appearance was in the 2001 children's television series Outriders.

== Personal life ==
In 2003, The Sydney Morning Herald revealed that the actor began a two-year stint as a Mormon missionary by the name of Elder Krok.

Prior to this, he commenced studying for a degree in civil engineering at the University of Western Sydney and has since transferred to the University of New South Wales where he is undertaking a double degree in civil and environmental engineering.

Matthew married Jade Bennallack on 5 July 2008 at the Sydney Australia Temple in Carlingford.

== Filmography ==
Year	Title	Role	Notes
1992	Eight Ball	Dougie	
1997	Paws	Bottom	
1997	Joey	Dooges Dixon	
