= Too Young for Ghosts =

1985 play by Janis Balodis

- Original language: English
- Written by: Janis Balodis
- Genre: family drama

Premiere
- Date: 4 July 1985
- Place: Studio, Victorian Arts Centre

Too Young for Ghosts is a 1985 play by Janis Balodis.

It was produced by both the Melbourne Theatre Company and Sydney Theatre Company in 1985, with subsequent productions in Brisbane in 1988 and Perth in 1991.

== Synopsis ==
Probing two points of contact between European migrants and northern Queensland, the play entwines the experience of Latvian migrants in 1948 and the expeditions of Ludwig Leichhardt in 1845.

== Critical reception ==
In a brief review in The Age a reviewer called it "a powerful work told with humour and awareness".

== Awards and nominations ==
Year	Award	Result	Ref.
1986	Louis Esson Prize for Drama	Won	

== See also ==
- 1985 in Australian literature
