= Hey Dad..! =

Australian sitcom

- Hey Dad..! logo
- Genre: Sitcom
- Created by: Gary Reilly & John Flanagan
- Starring: Hey Dad..! Cast→
- Country of origin: Australia
- Original language: English
- No. of seasons: 12
- No. of episodes: 291 (+2 unaired) (list of episodes)

Production
- Running time: 22–23 minutes (per episode)
- Production company: Gary Reilly Productions

Original release
- Network: Seven Network
- Release: 11 February 1987 – 17 August 1994

Hey Dad..! is an Australian sitcom produced by Gary Reilly Productions, originally airing from 1987 to 1994 on the Seven Network.

== Synopsis ==
Architect Martin Kelly singlehandedly raises his children: Simon, Debbie, and Jenny. His wife, Margaret, had died three years before the series' start.

Martin runs his own architectural business from the family home in the Sydney suburb of Chatswood. He employs his wife's cousin Betty Wilson, a good-natured ditz from the New South Wales country town of Walgett, as his secretary.

Many episodes deal with the daily stresses Martin faces as the family patriarch, such as settling arguments amongst his children. He frequently endures Betty's elaborate excuses for tardiness and is constantly frustrated with her delayed productivity at work. Simon's best friend is Gerald "Nudge" Noritas, a neighbour who constantly helps himself to whatever food he can find in the Kellys' kitchen.

In early episodes, the show briefly examines how the characters are struggling to deal with the absence of Margaret from their lives. Martin also breaks the fourth wall several times to deliver sarcastic one-liners to camera, although this is discontinued after the first 12 episodes.

=== Character replacements ===
As the series progressed, the original characters left one by one. Replacement characters were introduced to maintain the balance of the show's cast. The roles of two of Martin Kelly's children—Simon and Jenny—were recast during the show's run after the original actors left the series.

Early in season 5, Debbie Kelly moves to Dunk Island to work as a waitress. She is replaced by new character Sam Kelly, Martin's niece from Hong Kong who moves in. Nudge departs after the conclusion of season 5. No explanation is given in the show's story to explain his disappearance. From season 6, schoolboy Arthur MacArthur is the new neighbour who regularly visits. At the end of season 6, Simon moves out, leaving his friend Ben to move into Simon's room. At the end of season 12, Martin leaves for a $300,000-per-year contract to design and build a deep water port and mini-city in Saudi Arabia. He leaves the house and the business in the care of friend Greg Russell. Sam moves to Adelaide soon after, opening the door for Greg's daughter Tracy to move in.

At the end of the series, Betty and Jenny are the only remaining original characters. Jenny is portrayed by a different actress by this stage. Betty's portrayer Julie McGregor is the only original cast member to remain through the entire series.

=== Final episode ===
In the series finale, the regular characters are held hostage in the house by a fugitive bank robber. The robber places a bomb in the family's VCR, as leverage with the police. After the hostage drama has been resolved and the robber arrested the family remembers there is a bomb in the VCR, but they do not know how to re-program it. Betty observes that "this is just like E Street... at the end, where they all got blown up", but Greg responds that "That doesn't happen in sitcoms” (Greg's portrayer Mark Owen-Taylor had acted in E Street).The characters panic as they count down the seconds to the expected explosion and the screen fades to black. The cast are then shown in a curtain call as the credits roll. The curtain call includes former regular cast members Christopher Truswell and Sarah Monahan who do not otherwise appear in the episode, series producer and writer Gary Reilly and writer John Flanagan.

== Cast ==
=== Main characters ===
- Martin Kelly — Robert Hughes (1987–1994; episodes 1–265)
- Betty Wilson — Julie McGregor (1987–1994; episodes 1–291)
- Simon Kelly — Paul Smith (1987; episodes 1–39), Christopher Mayer (1988–1991; episodes 40–187)
- Debbie Kelly — Simone Buchanan (1987–1990, 1994; episodes 1–165, 268)
- Jennifer Kelly — Sarah Monahan (1987–1993; episodes 1–227), Angela Keep (1993–1994; episodes 231–291)
- Gerald 'Nudge' Noritas — Christopher Truswell (1987–1991, 1994; episodes 1–174, 291)
- Samantha Kelly — Rachael Beck (1991–1994; episodes 166–267)
- Arthur MacArthur — Matthew Krok (1991–1994; episodes 169, 178–291)
- Ben Hubner — Ben Oxenbould (1991–1994; episodes 177–291)
- Greg Russell — Mark Owen-Taylor (1993–1994; episodes 263–291)
- Tracy Russell — Belinda Emmett (1994; episodes 266–291)

=== Recurring characters ===
- Stan Hickey — Bill Young (episodes 17, 33, 48, 55, 73, 91, 92, 93, 130, 143, 164, 188, 189, 200)
- Lyn Parker — Mary Lou Stewart (episodes 233, 236, 239, 241, 244, 246, 248, 251, 253, 255, 264)
- Grandma Lois Kelly — Moya O'Sullivan (episodes 3, 21, 40, 71, 86, 134, 167)
- Jeanette Taylor — Joanne Samuel (episodes 67, 87, 93, 100, 114, 121, 134)
- Det. Sgt. Anne Burke — Tina Bursill (episodes 10, 11, 15, 22, 28, 34)
- Katie — Kate Morris (episodes 102, 110, 120, 145)
- Shelley — Beth Champion (episodes 214, 221, 224, 229)
- Elaine — Beth Buchanan (episodes 88, 98, 116)
- Karen — Rebecca Cross (episodes 176, 186, 187)
- Ros Woodlock — Laura Gabriel (episodes 233, 239, 248)
- Belinda — Naomi Watts (episodes 148, 153)
- Mr. Blunt — Doug Scroope (episodes 149, 220)
- Tessa MacArthur — Tayce Krok (episodes 184, 276)
- Jolanda LeClerk — Nikki Coghill (episodes 193, 203)
- Bruno — Rod Zuanic (episodes 197, 213)
- Dave Woodlock — Peter Braunstein (episodes 233, 239)
- Glenda the Bag Lady — Julie Haseler (episodes 262, 282)

== Production ==
The Hey Dad..! pilot was recorded in September 1985. The project stalled for several months as network executives were initially reluctant to commission the series. Twelve episodes were then recorded in mid-1986. The series was very close to being cancelled before it was even aired. The Seven Network ultimately bought the series, airing the first episode on 11 February 1987.

One episode was taped each week. Rehearsals generally started on a Tuesday, and were held each day until Saturday, when taping would take place before a studio audience at ATN Channel 7 Studios in Epping, New South Wales. The same episode was recorded twice on the same night in front of two different audiences. The taping with the better overall performance and more enthusiastic audience response was usually selected as the one to be aired. Sometimes the best takes from both tapings would be combined in post-production.

Production took a temporary break in mid-1991 when Hampton Court, another Gary Reilly sitcom featuring Betty Wilson, was produced. Hey Dad..! production resumed afterwards. Seven decided not to renew Hampton Court for a second season.

Hey Dad..! often used the same studio as another Seven Network series Home and Away. The night before Hey Dad..! was to be recorded in front of an audience, the crew would work overnight to take down the Home and Away set, replacing it with the Hey Dad..! set. After the Hey Dad..! tapings concluded on Saturday night, the Hey Dad..! set would be dismantled and replaced with the Home and Away set once again. This was a regular occurrence for the entire run of the series.

The exterior shots of the Kelly house were filmed using a miniature model constructed by British artist and designer Mike Worrall. Recording of the exteriors took place in-studio over the course of a two-day period, undergoing a range of lighting situations to re-create various weather conditions and times of day. Producers often found themselves taking phone calls from people wanting to know the address of the house, with the hope of purchasing it and moving in. After the series ended, the model was stored by the producers, as no museums were able to take it at the time. However, the model eventually disintegrated while in storage, and no longer exists.

== International versions ==
The series was sold to over 20 countries worldwide. Having been translated and dubbed into several different languages, the show was highly popular in France, Spain, and throughout Asia in the 1990s. A significant portion of its international fanbase was in Germany. German voice over artist Arne Elsholtz received critical praise for his work as translator, while also voicing Martin in the German version of episodes 1 to 149. The show was also aired on Malayalam channel Asianet in 1994.

== Parodies ==
A spoof by Peter Broelman titled Hey Dud! appeared in issue 291 of MAD Magazine's Australian edition, featuring characters such as Barfin' Killjoy, Petty, Simple, Dunny, Junky and Bludge. Coincidentally, 291 would also become the eventual number of episodes aired in the series.

In the late 1980s, the series was also parodied in a comedy sketch on the popular TV program The Comedy Company. The title of the show was again lampooned as Hey Dud!. The sketch featured series regulars Glenn Robbins as Martin Kelly, Peter Rowsthorn as Simon, Mary-Anne Fahey as Debbie, Christine Keogh as Betty and Russell Gilbert as Nudge, along with child actor Rebecca Smart (who was making a guest appearance in that week's episode) as Jenny. During the course of the sketch, an exasperated Jenny fired Betty, sent Nudge home, demanded that her two siblings find jobs, and then announced that the show would be renamed Hey Jenny!

In 1992, Christopher Truswell briefly reprised the role of Nudge in an episode of another popular TV comedy series, The Late Show, in which he appeared as part of the fictitious supergroup of "Grassby, Grills, Nudge & Plumb" (a parody of Crosby, Stills, Nash & Young, which also included politician Al Grassby, actor/comedian Lucky Grills and actor Gwen Plumb appearing as themselves).

In September 2006, satirical comedy current affairs show Real Stories aired a fictional story about an up-and-coming director attempting to make a feature film of Hey Dad..! The film was to be titled Hey Dad..! The Movie and was to star Stephen Curry (who made a cameo appearance in the Real Stories episode) as Hey Dad..! character Nudge.

== Airings ==
- Australia: Seven Network (original run, 1987–1994); Network Ten (repeats, 1998); Fox Classics (repeats, 2006–2007) The Comedy Channel (repeats, 2009)
- Germany: ARD (original run, episodes 1–149, 1990–1992); Kabel eins (original run, episodes 150–291, 1997–1998)

== Book, CD and DVD releases ==
- The Betty Wilson Secretarial Companion (Paperback) — Written by John Flanagan with Gary Reilly; Published by Penguin Books Australia Ltd. (24 April 1990)
- Martin vs Betty — The Best of Hey Dad — A CD compilation of audio clips from the show, released by Rich River Records (1991).
- The Best of Hey Dad..! Volume 1 — A collection of 13 episodes released through Shock DVD (18 March 2007).
- The Best of Hey Dad..! Volume 2 — A second set of 13 episodes released through Shock DVD (18 February 2008).
- Hey Dad..! Season 1 — A 5 disc set, released in Germany by Polyband (24 October 2008).
- Hey Dad..! Season 2 — German release by Polyband (27 March 2009).
- Hey Dad..! Season 3 — German release by Polyband (25 September 2009).
- Hey Dad..! Season 4 — German release by Polyband (26 March 2010)

== 2010 sexual abuse claims ==
In a March 2010 interview with Woman's Day magazine, regular cast member Sarah Monahan claimed she had been molested on set during the production of the series.

Although Monahan did not initially name the cast member, in an interview on A Current Affair that aired on 24 March 2010, Monahan alleged that it was the show's lead actor, Robert Hughes, who had sexually molested her. She claimed that this occurred on several occasions during production of the series. In addition, cast member Ben Oxenbould claimed he discovered Hughes touching a different young girl, who was a guest actor on an episode, in a way that seemed inappropriate.

After Monahan named Hughes, the executive producer, Gary Reilly made a statement to the press in which he stated that he had been unaware of any misconduct towards Monahan, but that he had been aware of rumours in regard to impropriety towards a young actor who joined after Monahan's departure, and that he had acted to provide a chaperone for the actor and had confronted the accused, who later resigned from the series. Reilly said he confronted a man accused of inappropriate treatment of a young cast member hired after Monahan had left the program. In response to Reilly's claim that he was unaware, Simone Buchanan and Ben Oxenbould came forward and alleged that they had separately approached Reilly during the show about Monahan's allegations towards Hughes, but had been warned to keep quiet. In March 2011, Gary Reilly admitted that he had "stand-up rows" with Hughes over the alleged abuse of Monahan which had driven Hughes' decision to resign from the show. Monahan announced that she intended taking civil action against Hughes and television station executives.

Hughes, confronted by A Current Affair in Singapore where he was living, denied the claims.

On 29 March 2010, police announced the creation of a task force, codenamed Strike Force Ruskin, to investigate the claims. On 30 March 2010, it was reported that detectives had begun interviewing former members of the show's cast and crew. In September 2010, six months after the allegations were published, it was reported that over a hundred people had been interviewed. Hughes was arrested in London on 9 August 2012 on 11 charges relating to the sexual and indecent assault of five girls in Sydney between 1985 and 1990. On 10 August, Hughes was released on $90,000 bail to appear before an extradition hearing on 19 September which Hughes' lawyers stated they would oppose. At that hearing, Hughes indicated that he intended to return to Australia for questioning. The matter was stood over to 28 September, when Hughes' extradition was approved.

In April 2014, Hughes was found guilty by a unanimous jury verdict of ten sexual offences: two counts of sexual intercourse with a child, seven counts of indecent assault upon a person under the age of 16 and one count of committing an indecent act. Hughes' lawyer stated that he will appeal the conviction. Hughes was sentenced to 10 years and nine months jail on 16 May 2014.

Hughes requested an international prisoner transfer to the UK, due to owning dual British-Australian citizenship; he later withdrew this application and instead renounced his Australian citizenship, allowing to be deported to the United Kingdom once paroled or his sentence completed. As a result, the New South Wales State Parole Authority refused parole in March 2020 as he would be deported and not under supervision, thus presenting an 'unacceptable risk to community safety'. Assessing Hughes' third bid for parole, the NSW State Parole Authority accepted expert evidence that assessed Hughes as a below-average risk of sexually reoffending. On 2 June 2022, Hughes was granted parole to face deportation to the United Kingdom upon his release from prison, no later than 14 June 2022. On 14 June 2022, Hughes was released into the custody of Australian Border Force officers to ensure he would be flown straight out of the country.

== See also ==
- List of Australian television series
