= Joanne Samuel =

Australian actress

- Born: c. 1956-1957 (aged 68-70); Camperdown, Sydney, New South Wales, Australia
- Education: Independent Theatre
- Occupations: Film and television actress
- Years active: 1973–present
- Known for: Mad Max (1979)
- Spouse: Nick A'Hern
- Children: 3

Joanne Samuel (born c. 1956-1957) is an Australian film and television actress, who is best known for her role as Jessie Rockatansky, the screen wife of Mel Gibson's title character in the 1979 film Mad Max.

== Early life and education ==
Joanne Samuel was born in Camperdown, Sydney, Australia. She studied dance with Honeybrooks and drama at the Independent Theatre.

== Career ==
Samuel made her screen debut in 1973, aged 16, in the ABC series Certain Women. Samuel made guest appearances in police procedurals Matlock Police and Homicide. She was then a regular cast member in television soap operas Class of '74 (playing Sue Taylor), The Sullivans and The Young Doctors, playing a nurse in the latter. Her character was written out of The Young Doctors, when she was offered the Mad Max role after a fellow actress who had been due to take the role fell ill.

Samuel later returned to television in the regular role of Kelly Morgan-Young in Skyways.

Samuel's film credits include supernatural horror Alison's Birthday (1981), Ozploitation thriller Early Frost (1982), TV road movie Queen of the Road (1984), The Long Way Home (1985), action film Nightmaster (1987, opposite Nicole Kidman), TV film Gallagher's Travels (1987), and Spook (1988).

In the late 1980s she was a regular on sitcom Hey Dad..! as Jeanette Taylor. She also guest starred in long-running medical series All Saints, and played Mrs. Bingle in The Wiggles Movie (1997).

Samuel's more recent credits include Rake (opposite Richard Roxburgh), and the biographical miniseries' Peter Allen: Not the Boy Next Door and Brock (2016). She then appeared as Doris Mercher in the 2017 family film My Pet Dinosaur, directed by Matt Drummond. and 2018 biographical drama film Acute Misfortune, playing the magistrate who dealt with the central character of Cullen. She played Therese in 2019 film Smoke Between Trees and also featured in Louis Mandylor's 2021 comedy Christmas Down Under, playing the wife of John Jarratt's character.

Samuel directed the web series Stinson Creek. She then made her feature film directing debut with the teen adventure The Legend of the Five. In 2023, she directed the teen coming-of-age dance drama The Red Shoes: Next Step.

Samuel is the vice chairman of BOOMPAA, Blue Mountains Performing Arts Association. Since 2013, she has taught theatre to young people aged from nine to 17 in the Blue Mountains, with the Three Sisters Youth Theatre.

== Personal life ==
Samuel is married to director of photography Nick A'Hern, and together they run a production company, Jah Media. She took a hiatus from acting to raise three children. Her son Jesse is a producer and director, with whom she worked with on The Legend of the Five and The Red Shoes: Next Step.

She has fond memories of her time working on Mad Max, and has kept in touch with Mel Gibson. When Samuel discovered she had bowel cancer, Gibson offered to get her treatment in the U.S., but she declined, wanting the support of family and friends in Australia.

Samuel supports the #MeToo movement after having been subject to harassment herself, in the 1970s.

== Filmography ==
=== Film ===
Year	Title	Role	Notes
1979	Mad Max	Jessie Rockatansky	Feature film
1981	Alison's Birthday	Alison Findlay	Feature film
1982	Early Frost	Chris	Feature film
1983	The City's Edge	Prostitute 1	Feature film
1984	Queen of the Road	Rosy Costello	TV film
1985	The Long Way Home	Julie	TV film
1986	Gallagher's Travels	Sally	TV film
1988	Nightmaster (aka Watch The Shadows Dance)	Sonia Spane	TV film
1988	Spook	Carole Bradly	Feature film
1993	You and Me and Uncle Bob	Rosie	Feature film
1997	The Wiggles Movie	Mrs. Rosemary Bingle	Feature film
2008	Not Quite Hollywood: The Wild, Untold Story of Ozploitation!	Herself	Feature film documentary
2017	My Pet Dinosaur	Doris Mercher	Feature film
2018	Acute Misfortune	Magistrate	Feature film
2019	Smoke Between Trees	Therese	Feature film
2019	The Greatest of These	Nan	Film short
2021	Christmas Down Under	Barbara Parker	Feature film
2023	What About Sal	Alice	Feature film

=== Television ===
Year	Title	Role	Notes
1973; 1974	Matlock Police	Jenny / Cathy Phillips	2 episodes
1974	Class of '74	Sue Taylor	2 episodes
1974	Homicide	Lynn Fisher	Episode: I Keep Going Back to Be Certain
1974	The Box	Mr. Baker's daughter	Episode #1.6
1975	Shannon's Mob	Felicity Maitland	Episode: Trip to Nowhere
1975–1976	Certain Women	Caroline Stone	29 episodes
1976	The Sullivans	Cynthia Cavanaugh	1 episode
1976–1978	The Young Doctors	Jill Gordon	255 episodes
1978	Case for the Defence	Amy	Episode: Second Time Around
1979	Cop Shop	Maureen Hamilton / Kenneth Willis	2 episodes
1979–1980	Skyways	Kelly Morgan Young	136 episodes
1981	Ratbags	Various characters	12 episodes
1986	Five Times Dizzy	Chris Brooking	12 episodes
1988–1990	Hey Dad..!	Jeanette Taylor	7 episodes
1997	Fallen Angels	Helen Bader	Wpisode: Smoke Gets in Your Eyes
2001	All Saints	Ingrid Clements	Episode: Skeletons in the Closet
2006	Where Are They Now?	Guest	1 episode
2008	Not Quite Hollywood: Deleted and Extended Scenes	Herself	Video
2014	Rake	Nurse	Episode #3.7
2015	Peter Allen: Not the Boy Next Door	Bev Moulson	Miniseries, 2 episodes
2015	Mad Max: Cast and Crew Interviews	Self	Video
2015	The Madness of Max	Self	Film documentary
2016	Brock	Louise Kraft	Miniseries, 2 episodes
2018	Stinson Creek	Legal Aid	Web series, episode: "The Witness"
2019	Kapow!	Self	1 episode
2022	Mad Max Fans: Beyond the Wasteland	Self	Film documentary
