= Sarah Monahan =

Australian former child actress (born 1977)

- Born: 12 April 1977 (age 49); Sydney, Australia
- Occupations: Filmmaker, actress
- Years active: 1986–present
- Spouse: Matt Morris
- Military career
- Branch: Texas State Guard Medical Brigade
- Service years: 2011–2014
- Website: www.sarahmonahan.com

Sarah Monahan (born 12 April 1977) is an Australian-American former child actress. Best known for her role as Jenny Kelly on Hey Dad..!, she also appeared in Sons and Daughters and Home and Away.

== Early career ==
Monahan got her start in the industry from her fashion designer father. She was the in-house model for his children's clothing line, and later, went on to appear in over 100 television and print ads.

== Hey Dad..! ==
Monahan auditioned for the role of Jenny in Hey Dad..! when she was six. Even though the producers were looking for a younger actress, her small stature at the time, combined with her ability to read the script, helped her to win the role. After filming the pilot, she spent a short time on the Australian soap opera Sons and Daughters, playing the role of Cassie Hunt in 24 episodes that first aired in early 1986. She returned to filming on Hey Dad..! that year, and stayed with the show for six years, departing in 1993 one year before the show concluded. She became the primary income earner for her family when her father died just before Hey Dad...! debuted.

== Later career ==
Monahan returned to Australian television for a short time as Heather in another long running Australian soap opera, Home and Away, in 1995 and alongside fellow Hey Dad..! actress, Simone Buchanan in Pacific Drive, performing a non-speaking role.

Monahan later founded ShrimpTank Productions, which works in social media and search engine optimisation, along with Going Down, a planned travel and diving web series.

Monahan authored a book, titled Allegedly which was released by New Holland Publishers on March 7, 2016.

== Sexual assault ==
In March 2010, Monahan stated in an interview with Woman's Day magazine, and later on current affairs television program A Current Affair, that she was sexually abused on the set of Hey Dad...! by Robert Hughes, the actor who played her on-screen father. Hughes denied the allegations and claimed to have engaged defamation lawyers.

During an interview aired on A Current Affair in March 2011, Monahan expressed her concerns that charges may not be laid against Hughes. She stated that she intended to initiate legal actions against Hughes and television executives who, she claimed, were aware of Hughes' alleged actions and failed to take action. After her allegations in the media, Braveheart, a sexual assault advocacy group, asked Monahan to become an ambassador.

Hughes was arrested in London on 9 August 2012. His extradition to Australia was approved on 28 September 2012. In early April 2014, Hughes was found guilty of sexually abusing young girls.

== Personal life ==
Monahan lived in the US with her American husband, Matt Morris, whom she met in Brisbane, Australia.

In 2011, Monahan joined the Texas State Guard Medical Brigade, a branch of the Texas Military Forces whose focus is on humanitarian missions, and remained as a medical officer for the guard until 2014.

Monahan has been an active campaigner for rights for child actors, and victims of sexual assault. She teamed up with Derryn Hinch to campaign for a sex offender registry in Australia, she has participated in social media campaigns such as #LetHerSpeak and #JusticeShouldntHurt. She is part of American charity, A Minor Consideration, and has spoken publicly at conferences on being a leader in speaking up on abuse.

In 2026 Monahan was announced as the new owner of the Honey Rider bar in Neutral Bay, on the lower north shore of Sydney.
