= Hancock case =

Australian criminal case

The Hancock case was an infamous criminal case in Western Australia concerning allegations that a well respected former policeman Don Hancock murdered a member of the Gypsy Joker Motorcycle Club, William "Billy" Grierson, in 2000 and that in turn the Gypsy Jokers murdered Hancock in revenge in 2001. The American biker expert Thomas Barker wrote that the murder of Hancock was the most "notorious" biker-related crime in Australia since the Milperra massacre of 1984.

== Background ==
Don Hancock, known as "the Silver Fox" or as "the Don", was one of the most respected and honored policemen in Australia. In 1982, Hancock had investigated the Perth Mint Swindle case that saw the three Mickelberg brothers convicted for stealing 65 kilograms of gold, a theft that had acquired a legendary reputation in Australia and made Hancock into a local celebrity. Hancock had served as the director of the Criminal Investigation Branch of the Western Australia Police Force. Hancock with his white hair, expensive clothing, and an easy-going manner reminded many of a "courtly gentleman", an impression further reinforced by his tendency to recite poetry in his booming voice. He could recite from memory the poems in the 1870 book Bush Ballads and Galloping Rhymes by Adam Lindsay Gordon, and his recitations commanded attention. However, Hancock was known to his colleagues such as Detective Jack Peter Lee to have a "dark side" as he was extremely ruthless and competitive as he would not accept any sort of personal defeat. The normally affable Hancock was known to explode in fury if he lost a game of billiards as he insisted that he had to win at everything and to lose at anything would reduce him to a state of white-hot rage. For this reason, other police officers would not play billiards with Hancock or intentionally lose the game rather than face Hancock's anger. Hancock's triumph in the Perth mint swindle was marred by allegations that he had tortured one of the Mickelberg brothers, Peter, into confessing to the theft. The Mickelberg brothers were acquitted in 2004.

The Canadian journalists Julian Sher and William Marsden described Hancock as being a "frontier justice" policeman whose methods were better suited to a gold rush community in the Outback in the 19th century than to modern Australia. The Australian journalist Tony Barrass wrote in 2018: "A no-nonsense, old school detective, Hancock’s running battles with the Mickelberg brothers of Perth Mint Swindle fame, along with a range of high-profile criminal cases including the Shirley Finn murder, had made him a household name in WA [Western Australia]. Big, intimidating with a booming voice, you did not mess with The Silver Fox".

After his retirement in 1994, Hancock spent much time in the Outback community of Ora Banda, a village of about 50 people that was dominated by his family. The Hancock family had arrived in Australia from England during a 1893 gold rush. Both Hancock's father and grandfather had prospected for gold in the Ora Banda area and he felt a deep connection to a community that he considered home. Ora Banda was a community that was economically dominated by Hancock who owned via his company Wentworth Holdings WA Pty Limited the local pub, the trailer park, the general store, the Ora Banda Historic Inn, the only restaurant in Ora Banda along with its beer garden, the other only motel in Ora Banda, and the 19th century gold crusher that was still working in 2000. Outside of the pub was a racetrack managed by Hancock who held the annual Kalgoorlie racing round there. He did not own the racetrack, but behaved as if he did. Finally, Hancock owned a gold concession, Grant's Patch, that had a shack that contained a .303 rifle and 51 rounds of ammunition. He had hopes of turning Ora Banda, an early 20th century gold rush boomtown, into a tourist attraction that would remind Australians of their heritage. Hancock was an avid hunter of kangaroos and was by all accounts an excellent shot.

== The Grierson murder ==
On Sunday, October 1, 2000, Hancock along with his wife Elizabeth were expecting an influx of tourists at the Ora Banda Historical Inn. Elizabeth Hancock told Sher and Marsden in 2006: "It was a really lovely sunny day and we had lots of people out. The bar and beer garden were full and everyone was really happy". Among those present in Ora Banda that day were two officers of the Western Australia police who had driven out from Kalgoorlie to see Hancock, Senior Sergeant Kim Gage and Detective Senior Constable Sean Gartlan.

Hancock had spent the morning prospecting for gold in the Outback and at noon was drinking with his wife Elizabeth along with Gage and Gartlan and their wives. At that moment, a group of Gypsy Jokers roared into Ora Banda on their motorcycles and wearing their gang colors. Amongst the Gypsy Jokers were Graeme “Slim” Slater, William Joseph “Billy” Grierson, and Sidney John Reid. The "bikies" (the Australian term for outlaw bikers) were all from the Kalgoorlie chapter of the Gypsy Jokers. The Gypsy Jokers were an American club whose first Australian chapter had been established in 1969 in Melbourne. The Gypsy Jokers were viewed by the police as one of the most violent biker gangs in Australia.

The Gypsy Jokers set up a campfire under a giant banner that read "Gypsy Joker Motorcycle Club". Much to Hancock's displeasure, the Gypsy Jokers raced around the racetrack in their motorcycles and did much damage to the grounds. Hancock had long hated outlaw bikers, whom he referred to as "criminal scumbags", and was clearly deeply unhappy about the presence of the Gypsy Jokers in Ora Banda. Rebecca Price, the chef of the Ora Banda Inn's restaurant, recalled that Hancock was drunk that day and in a belligerent mood as he cursed at his wife for taking too long in the washroom. Price told Sher and Marsden: "When Don has been drinking, he's generally a lot worse. He's got that typical policeman's attitude that he's higher up than anyone else and can do whatever he wants...When he really does drink, he doesn't drink in moderation, he drinks like a fish".

At about 4 pm, the Gypsy Jokers entered the restaurant and ordered drinks. Price stated that Elizabeth Hancock was worried as she kept saying "I wish these damn bikies would go" and "I'm just worried about Don". By this time, Gage and Gartlan had left for Kalgoorlie. There was much tension in the pub as Hancock made clear his unhappiness that the Gypsy Jokers were drinking in his bar. Trouble began at about 6 pm when one of the Gypsy Jokers, James "Spud" Manson, tried to provoke a fight with another bar patron, Robbie Mitchell, which increased the tension in the pub. Manson told Mitchell: "You're a fucking wanker". Hancock stiffly ordered Manson to stop harassing Mitchell and to return to his table.

Hancock's daughter, Alison, worked as a waitress in the restaurant, and at that point, she was subjected to crude sexual advances from the Gypsy Jokers. Hancock with a cold fury in his voice told the Gypsy Jokers: "This is my daughter behind the bar. I'd appreciate it if you would refrain from talking like that. If there's any sign of trouble, I'm going to close the pub". One of the Gypsy Jokers, William "Billy" Grierson, told Hancock "no worries". About five minutes later, Grierson went up to Hancock to tell him: "Don't you threaten us! We'll go and drink our own beer". Hancock replied: "What are you on about?" Grierson replied: "If that's your fucking attitude, we'll just go down and drink piss [beer] out of our esky [cooler]". Hancock shouted: "That's it. I don't need this. I'm closing the pub". A moment later, a furious Hancock drove off in his Ford 100 "ute" (the Australian English term for a pick-up truck) in the direction of Grant's Patch. Kirten Forster, a mine technician, asked Alison Hancock what was happening and received the reply: "Dad's closing the bar and he's going to get his gun".

The Gypsy Jokers returned to their campfire when they started to drink beer out of their cooler. At about 7: 15 pm, Hancock returned from Grant's Patch. One of the pub's cooks, Patricia McQueen, was told by Elizabeth Hancock: "I'd better go and find Don before he does something stupid". At about 7: 45 pm, a gunman opened fire with a rifle at the Gypsy Jokers. The Gypsy Jokers took cover, but then decided that it was just someone hunting kangaroos in the evening. Slater stated in a 2018 interview: "Billy said, ‘He’s probably just trying to scare us’, and I said, ‘Well, he’s doing a bloody good job’. Anyway, about 15 minutes goes past and Billy then says, ‘Fuck this,’ we went back to where we were and the next shot went straight through him". At about 7:55 pm, the gunman opened fire again and killed Grierson. The bullet entered under his left shoulder blade, severed his spinal cord, and exited under his right chest cavity, killing him. Slater stated in the same 2018 interview: "“I tell you one thing, He was a bloody good shot...it must have been 600m away in the dark". It remains unclear even today if the shooter was trying to scare away the Gypsy Jokers or was trying to kill Grierson.

The Gypsy Jokers fled in terror with Grierson's corpse to the Cawse nickel mine that was located 9 miles away. Upon being informed by the mine's first aid post attendants that Grierson was dead, the Gypsy Jokers removed his biker's vest which had the Gypsy Joker patch on the back along with badges on the front decorated with the Iron Cross and a Nazi swastika. Likewise, they removed his belt whose buckle was shaped in the patch of the Gypsy Jokers. Grierson's corpse was abandoned along a dirt road.

== The Investigation of the Grierson murder ==
A team of policemen arrived to investigate the murder. Price and McQueen both mentioned to the officers that Alison and Elizabeth Hancock had both stated that Donald Hancock had gone to get his rifle shortly before Grierson was killed. Of the about 40 people present when Grierson was killed, Donald Hancock was the only person who did not have an alibi for where he was when the murder occurred. Elizabeth Hancock told Price: "I left the pub at 7:20 pm. I went home and Don was having a shower. He was home all the time. I sniffed Don's guns and they didn't smell as if they'd been fired". Price found her remark to be an odd one. One of the officers, Senior Constable Dave Roper, interviewed Hancock, who seemed calm. When Roper told him that someone had "apparently" been killed, Hancock grew angry and asked him: "What do you mean 'apparently'?" Roper replied: "Well, I wasn't here at the time, so I can only say apparently". Hancock asked him: "What do you mean?" Roper stated: "Mr. Hancock, I'm aware of who you are and what you used to be, so you know what I mean when I say 'apparently'". When Hancock asked if he was a suspect, Roper told him that everyone was a suspect at the moment. Hancock held up his hands in a mock surrender and told Roper: "I'm saying nothing. You'll have to speak with my solicitor". Roper told Hancock to remain at the Inn, but he ignored that request by returning to his house.

Roper sent two constables, Justin Dwyer and Max Janse, to go find Hancock. Upon arriving at his house, they met Hancock whom they noticed had just taken a shower and was wearing new clothes. The two officers noticed that Hancock was eating an orange and his hands were socked in orange juice. It is widely, but wrongly believed that the citric acid in oranges destroys gunpower residue. Dwyer and Janse informed Hancock that he was supposed to remain at the inn and received the reply that he was not answering any questions. Only when Dwyer and Janse threatened to arrest him for hindering an investigation did Hancock agree to return to the inn. Gage along with Detective Noreen O'Rourke arrived to take charge of the investigation. Gage called the Perth police headquarters to ask for a computer check on any guns that might be owned by Hancock. The computer search revealed that Hancock owned three rifles along with a shotgun.

Gage told Hancock that Grierson was dead, and noticed that he seemed agitated at the news while Elizabeth Hancock started to tremble. When Gage asked Hancock what had happened, he answered: "I'm not saying anything until I speak to my solicitor". When Gage interviewed Elizabeth Hancock, she became very emotional and incoherent and the interview was swiftly ended when Hancock told his wife she could refuse to give a statement until their lawyer was present. Gage decided that he did not have enough evidence to ask for a warrant to seize the clothing that Hancock was wearing at the time of the murder. Gage did not ask for the clothing that Hancock had wearing earlier nor did he ask what had happened to those clothes. At about midnight, Gage declared it was too dark to search for evidence, and the investigation would start again in the morning. Even though Gage considered Hancock to be the prime suspect, he allowed him to keep the keys to his buildings and to remain at large. That Gage did not obtain a warrant for searching Hancock's house and that he failed to order "routine forensic science tests" is controversial.

At about 8 pm on 2 October, Gage started the investigation again. At about 11 am, the Hancocks returned to their house in Perth. O'Rourke attempted to interview the Gypsy Jokers who were notably angry about what they regarded as a police double standard with Hancock said to be receiving preferential treatment because he was a former policeman. She was able to have the Gypsy Jokers hand over to the police Grierson's biker vest and belt, but promised to return the items after a forensic examination, which was unusual as normally the Crown would hold those items as evidence in a trial. She was also able to have the Slater and Manson gave statements though neither men were willing to sign them. O'Rourke recalled when interviewing Grame "Slim" Slater of the Gypsy Jokers: "He was very angry, very agitated, aggressive towards me". When she told him that at present the police did not have enough evidence to charge Hancock, he told her: "Fuck you and your ways! I'm going to take care of it my way!"

Later that day, Detective Jack Lee arrived from Perth to take charge. As Lee made the 7 hour long drive to Ora Banda on the Great Eastern Highway, he felt "deep apprehension" as he knew that bikie cases were very difficult to solve and that a former policeman was the chief suspect. Lee, a veteran of the Royal Australian Navy who joined the Western Australia Police Service after his honorable discharge, disliked the Outback. Lee described the Outback as a harsh desert where men outnumbered women four to one and where alcoholism and amphetamine abuse were major problems with the miners who worked in the area. Lee said of the Outback: "Desert, really. There's nothing else out there". Upon arriving in Ora Banda, Lee removed Gage from the case under the grounds there was a conflict of interest as Gage was a friend of Hancock's. Lee was convinced that Hancock was the killer. Lee told Sher and Marsden in a 2006 interview: "Hancock was an absolute gentleman of the old school. And I think he was not the sort of guy who would have backed down in front of what he regarded as scum". In her statement to the police, Elizabeth Hancock had stated she was watching the 2000 Sydney Olympics with her husband around 7:30 pm and then went out to see if Alison Hancock was not in danger at the Inn after she heard the first shot fired. She further stated that her husband remained at home to keep watching the Olympics and was still there when she returned home. According to the witnesses, Elizabeth Hancock did appear at the inn to see if her daughter was safe shortly after the first shot was fired. Lee told Sher and Marsden about Elizabeth Hancock's statement that her husband remained at home after the first shot was fired: "It's wrong. It doesn't happen. It's not police behavior. A copper doesn't send his wife to see if his daughter been shot...Don Hancock killed Billy Grierson. That's what I believe". Lee argued to Sher and Marsden that Elizabeth Hancock's story was implausible, and must had been a lie to provide her husband with an alibi.

The bullets were fired from a .303 rifle that Lee believed to be an unregistered rifle left over from either World War One or World War Two. Such rifles left over from the two world wars are common in the Outback as many servicemen took their rifles home after their discharges from the military. The dry, arid climate of the Outback acts as a preservative and rifles from both world wars are still commonly used in the Outback. The shots were fired from an incline that was located very close to Hancock's house. The murder weapon was never found. In 2022, a journalist Rex Haw, said of Hancock: "If anyone knows how to murder someone and get away with it, it would’ve been him".

== The Revenge of the Gypsy Jokers ==
On 13 October 2000, the Gypsy Jokers bombed the Ora Banda Historical Inn. The Gypsy Jokers dug up a coffin from a graveyard in Kalgoorlie that belonged to a teenage boy and placed among his bones a bomb made of Power gel explosive that is commonly used in the mining industry along with PVC pipes and a fuse. The bomb was placed on the front veranda of the Ora Banda Historical Inn and was set off. The explosion almost killed Paul Hancock, the son of Donald, who had been left in charge of the inn. Mike Bezemer, the boyfriend of Alison Hancock, returned from a trip to Tasmania on 18 October to take care of the Ora Banda Inn. On 21 October 2000, Bezemer was drinking with a friend, Ray Pinner, in the beer garden, when he noticed two Gypsy Jokers, namely Reid and Mason, drove up and asked Pinner how many people were in Ora Banda. Pinner replied "basically nobody", and at that point, Mason and Reid drove off.

On 1 November 2000, two Gypsy Jokers, Grame "Slim" Slater and Sid "Snot" Reid, dosed Hancock's Ora Banda house in gasoline and attempted to burn it down via Molotov cocktails. Slater and Reid had used plastic bottles for their Molotov cocktails, which failed to explode. Belatedly, Reid and Slater found that Molotov cocktails needed glass bottles to be effective. On 5 November 2000, the Gypsy Jokers returned to Ora Banda to bomb the Hancock house, the gold mill and Inn. Hancock's Ora Banda house and the gold mill along much of the front half of the Ora Banda Historical Inn were destroyed by the explosions and the resulting fires. Bezemer who was in Ora Banda during the bombings, called Alison who was in Perth on his cell phone. As he called her to tell her he was safe, the bomb that destroyed the gold mill along with the 19th century gold crusher and the Crosley diesel motor that powered it went off in the background.

On 5 December 2000, Slater and Reid were arrested on charges of assaulting a man in Kalgoorlie. One of their bail conditions stated that they could not live in the same community as the victim, namely Kalgoorlie, causing both men to move to Perth in January 2001 where they became members of the Perth chapter of the Gypsy Jokers. Hancock expressed no fear of the Gypsy Jokers as he told the policeman Stephen Brown: "If they're going to get me, they're going to get me". Two security cameras were placed in front of Hancock's house, but he and his wife did not change the tapes on a daily basis, which defeated the purpose of the cameras. One of the Gypsy Joker leaders, Gary White, used a female employee of the Western Australia Department of Transportation, to look up the license plates of enemies of the Gypsy Jokers. In this way, the Gypsy Jokers learned that Hancock lived on Enfield Street in Lathlain. At about 11 pm on 22 June 2001, Lenny Kirby, the president of the Perth Gypsy Joker chapter along with Stevie Adams, the chapter treasurer, were discovered parked in front of Hancock's house, watching who was coming and going. Hancock refused an offer of police protection despite warnings that his life was in danger.

On 10 August 2001, White asked his transport contact to look up the license plate of Lou Lewis, who was the best friend of Hancock. Both Lewis and Hancock went to the Belmont Park Raceway every Saturday afternoon to bet on horses. Hancock and Lewis always took the same route at the same time and drank in the same pub afterwards, where unknown to them they were being watched by Mark "Moone" Barrie of the Gypsy Jokers. Hancock stymied the murder investigation by only speaking to Lee when his lawyer was present and he demanded that Lee submit his questions in writing in advance. The answers that Lee received from Donald, Elizabeth and Alison Hancock about happened on 1 October 2000 were word for word the same.

== The Hancock Murder ==
On the morning of Saturday, 1 September 2001, Hancock and Lewis went off to gamble on the horses at the Belmont Park Raceway. Reid was picked up the same morning by Slater where they drove to the parking lot at the Belmont Park Raceway. Reid broke into Lewis's automobile and placed a bomb under the driver's seat. When Hancock and Lewis got into the automobile, they were followed by Slater and Reid in a van. According to Reid, Slater took out his cellphone, dialed a number intended to activate the bomb and said "rest in peace, Billy". The call should have activated the bomb, but at the time a bomb scare at a nearby casino led to an evacuation of about 20,000 people, most of whom used their cellphones to call their loved ones. The number of calls overwhelmed the cell phone system for Perth and caused the bomb activation call to be rerouted. Reid testified that Slater later smashed up the cell phone.

At about 6: 35 pm as Lewis was parking his car in Hancock's driveway, the rerouted cell phone call finally reached the bomb. The explosion destroyed the car and severed Hancock into two with his upper torso being blasted into his backyard. Lewis's body remained intact, but the blast force destroyed his internal organs, killing him instantly. Detective Stephen Brown said of the crime scene: "“It was a scene of devastation. The explosion was such that the materials, debris and other items were strewn over dozens of houses, to neighbouring streets".

== The Investigation of the Hancock murder ==
The murder of Hancock attracted much media attention in Australia. The Western Australia police force launched Operation Zircon intended to arrest Hancock's killers, launching raids on the homes of the Gypsy Jokers and their clubhouse. Found inside of Slater's house was a shrine to Grierson that included the following poem: "Hey Buddy, what's say? You were taken from us by a cowardly dog but remember buddy every dog has its day". The police found no evidence related to Hancock's murder, but did find enough evidence to lay 130 charges for drug trafficking and gun possession on the basis of what was discovered in the raids. The police discovered three kilograms of amphetamine and $363,000 in cash in Kirby's house. He was convicted, leading for Slater to be promoted up to be the new Perth chapter president of the Gypsy Jokers.

Detective John "Jock" Robertson had been a detective in his native Glasgow until he relocated to Perth in 1983. The other detectives in Operation Zircon used methods based on those used by the American Federal Bureau of Investigation that were centered on intelligence-gathering and tracing a suspect's activities while Robertson favored the traditional British police methods of confronting the suspect head-on, known as "getting in the face" of a suspect. On 4 September 2001, Reid was arrested on unrelated drug charges in Fremantle. Robertson used the occasion to confront Reid at the Fremantle police station. Reid's first words upon seeing Robertson was to say: "Fuck off! I'm not talking to you!" Despite Reid's words, Robertson believed that he could be broken into turning Crown's evidence as most outlaw bikers say nothing to the police when being interviewed. Robertson believed that Reid was the "weakest link" as he was a drug addict who squandered most of his income on amphetamines; had a long criminal record for petty crimes, but no convictions for major crimes; and had been a member of the Gypsy Jokers for only two years, meaning that he was not "wedded" to the club in the same way that the other members were. Robertson stated: "I never did doubt that Reid was either involved or knew who was". Robertson told Sher and Marsden: "My role was to befriend Sid Reid, get Reid's trust, and show him another life besides the bikies. I wanted to isolate him from the bikies and build up a distrust by the bikies for Sid Reid--get into their heads".

Reid was released on bail and returned to Perth. Robertson had the house where Reid lived with his common-law wife Natasha Moutinho bugged. From listening in, Robertson learned that the couple constantly fought while being very worried about financial matters. Robertson visited Reid almost everyday at his house at 50 Weston Avenue. Robertson taunted Reid about his financial problems as he reminded him that Gypsy Joker leaders such as Kirby and Slater were very affluent while he could barely afford the mortgage on his house. Robertson reminded Reid that the Crown had offered a reward of $500,000 Australian dollars for information leading to the arrest of Hancock's killers, which was more money than he was making as a low level drug dealer for the Gypsy Jokers.

Robertson as part of his psychological campaign intended to "crack" Reid confronted Lenny Kirby's brother, Thomas, who was also a Gypsy Joker, about a marijuana shipment that the police had seized. Robertson subtly dropped hints that Reid was an informer who was behind the marijuana seizure. Robertson's tactics worked, and the Gypsy Jokers started to believe that Reid was an informer, leading for Reid to be marginalised within the Gypsy Jokers. Police wiretaps showed that the Gypsy Jokers debated the merits of killing Reid. Mistaking Robertson's Scots accent for an Irish accent, the Gypsy Jokers referred to him as "the Irish cunt", and the police wiretaps showed that only the fear that the "Irish cunt" might be present prevented them from killing Reid at his house. At a meeting in Gosnell Park, Reid was told by Slater not to speak to his friend Tony Sarros, whom the Gypsy Jokers suspected might also be an informer after Robertson was seen talking to him several times. On 13 February 2002, Slater confronted Reid outside of his house and told him: "If you fucking talk to Sarros again, you're fucking dead!"

On 14 February 2002, Robertson had Reid arrested out of the hope that he might be "cracked" into turning Crown's evidence. Reid was questioned by Detectives Stephen Brown and Peter De La Motte starting at 9:07 pm. Reid refused to say anything at all. In a gambit to make him confess, Brown and Motte fed Reid the misinformation that his DNA had been found at the Hancock crime scene. Despite revealing that they had security camera footage showing Reid planting the bomb, he remained silent for the first hour. During the second and third sessions, Reid again remained silent. At 1:29 am, Brown and Motte turned over the interrogation to Robertson. Robertson warned Reid that his fellow Gypsy Jokers were planning to kill him along with his common-law wife Moutinho and promised him that he could protect the couple if he agreed to turn Crown's evidence. Roberston told Reid he was "living only an existence. It wasn't a life". Reid finally broke down and confessed as he described his role in the Hancock murder in exchange for a promise that he and Moutinho would be placed in witness protection.

Reid accused White of murdering a rival drug dealer, Anthony Tapley, in August 2001 and claimed to have been present when White killed Tapley. Reid served as the Crown's star witness at White's trial, which ended with him being convicted of first-degree murder. Between February–October 2002, Reid gave three signed statements about the Hancock murder along with a videotaped confession. In each of his statements and in his videotaped confession, there were a number of differences in each version. In all of Reid's statements, the leading role in the Hancock murder was always assigned to Slater, but the extent of his own involvement differed from statement to statement. The police had bugged Slater's cell phone and his house, but did not interview his friends and associates about where he was on 1 September 2001.

Sher and Marsden wrote: "The investigation into Reid had been along the more traditional British style of actively stalking the target with face-to-face interviews on the street, in his home, at the police station, interviewing everybody around him, his family, his friends, his neighbours, his business associates. Make him think you have far more than you actually have. Break him down. The approach to Slater was strictly FBI. It was covert and heavily reliant on technology such as bugs and telephone intercepts. Investigators created a blackboard profile of their target, red-flagging evidence from wiretaps and phone records that pointed to his guilt. They neglected, however, to conduct extensive and repeated interviews with his friends and relatives about Slater's activities on the day of the Hancock and Lewis murders, so they had no real historical record against which they could check Slater's alibis".

Slater had been arrested the day after Reid confessed. Slater said little and seemed more interested in learning what Reid had revealed. Against Robertson's advice, Slater was arrested and charged with wilful murder (i.e. first-degree murder) in October 2002. Robertson felt the police needed more evidence than Reid's statements, which kept changing from statement to statement, before charging Slater.

== The Trial of Graeme Slater ==
At his trial, Slater was defended by Colin Lovitt, a well known lawyer from Melbourne whom Sher and Marsden described as "a fearless, highly theatrical pleader". The trial began in the fall of 2003. The Crown did not allow Reid to testify in person, and instead had him testify virtually via a television that was played in the courtroom. The fact that Reid was only a face talking on a television made him appear remote and untrustworthy to the jury. Lovitt attacked Reid for the conflicting and contradictory information in his various statements and accused him of perjury.

Slater had an alibi as his mother and sister both testified that he had been with him in Northam celebrating Father's Day (celebrated in Australia in September) on the day that Hancock was murdered. The Crown Attorney introduced as evidence that Slater had been making phone calls in Perth using his wife's cell phone on 1 September 2001 and thus was not in Northam as he claimed. However, the emotional testimony from Slater's mother and sister made a greater impression on the jury than did the cell phone record.

Mid-way through the trial, a letter by Slater was discovered under which he asked a friend to commit perjury by testifying that Reid had been expelled from the Gypsy Jokers "a day or two before he got arrested". In his letter, Slater admitted that this statement was a lie as Reid was still a member of the Gypsy Jokers at the time of his arrest in February 2002, but argued that having such perjured testimony introduced as evidence would allow Lovitt to present Reid to the jury as an angry man out for revenge following his alleged expulsion.The Crown Attorney argued that Slater's entire defense was a lie while Lovitt sought to explain away the letter as a desperate attempt by a wrongly accused man to be acquitted. The trial ended on 30 October 2003 with Slater being acquitted as the jury did not find Reid to be a creditable witness for the Crown. In a statement to the media, Elizabeth Hancock said she was "deeply devastated and shocked" by the acquittal.

== Aftermath ==
As part of his plea bargain, Reid was sentenced to 15 years in prison. When Reid was sentenced, a Letter of Comfort was written in support of him by the Western Australia assistant police commissioner Tim Atherton. Reid was provided with cash, a Sony Play station and allowed conjugal visits with his common-law wife as part of his plea bargain. His common-law wife, Natasha Moutinho, ultimately left him for another man. Slater was convicted of arson for burning down Hancock's Ora Banda house in 2000. He made a plea bargain with the Crown where he pledged guilty to the arson charges in exchange for a reduced sentence. Slater continues to maintain his innocence with the regard to the Hancock murder and alleges that Reid murdered Hancock with the help of persons unknown.

Elizabeth Hancock told the journalist Luke Eliot: "The evidence against Don was completely hearsay. There was no real evidence against Don. The man didn’t do it for a start. If he was guilty I would not have been there defending him as I always have...None of us have got over it because we knew the kind of man Don was. To have all of that, all the time, is just so hard." Lee still believes that Hancock killed Grierson. Lee told Sher and Marsden in a 2006 interview: "Don Hancock killed Billy Grierson. That's what I believe. Can I establish that in front of a corner's court, where the requirement is within the realm of probability? Yes, I believe I can. Can I establish it in a court of law, where the requirement is beyond a reasonable doubt? No, the evidence simply isn't there". Nikki Skerry, the girlfriend of Grierson who was pregnant with his child at the time of his killing, fought very hard for a coroner's inquest where she hoped might name the killer of her boyfriend. Skerry told Eliot: "There will never be any truth. I will never know the truth, but in my heart at least I know I fought for some kind of truth about Billy. The pain of losing him will never go away." Skerry expressed sadness that her son, Iszaack, never knew his father. Brad Lewis, the son of Lou Lewis, said of his father's murder: "They say time heals but when your father or anyone so close to you is taken so quickly and without any reasoning at it, it’s something you never recover from. With the passage of time, some people say that you get over these things, but you don’t. When there was absolutely no reason to involve my father in it, it’s particularly hard".

On 21 April 2006, coroner Alastair Hope ruled that Grierson's death was a murder done by persons unknown. Hope ruled that he could not name the killer as Hancock was dead and the "notoriously anti-social past behaviour of the Gypsy Jokers" ensured that they had a number of enemies. Hope ruled: "There is a significant body of evidence which suggests Mr. Hancock may have been the shooter. But much of that evidence is circumstantial and in my view is not so overwhelming that the only available inference is that Mr. Hancock was the shooter." In 2007, the American biker expert Thomas Barker wrote that it is "generally" accepted that Hancock killed Grierson. Reid was released from prison in 2018. On 17 May 2019, the Ora Banda Inn, which had been built in 1911 during the gold rush, was burned down. In 2022, the Hancock case was the subject of a six part television series Bikie Code: Murder, Revenge and the Gypsy Jokers.

== Books ==
- Barker, Thomas (2007). Biker Gangs and Organized Crime. Lexington: University of Kentucky. ISBN 9781437755077.
- Sher, Julian; Marsden, William (2006). Angels of Death: Inside the Bikers' Empire of Crime. Toronto: Alfred Knopf Canada. ISBN 9780307370327.
