= Injustice =

Quality relating to unfairness or undeserved outcomes

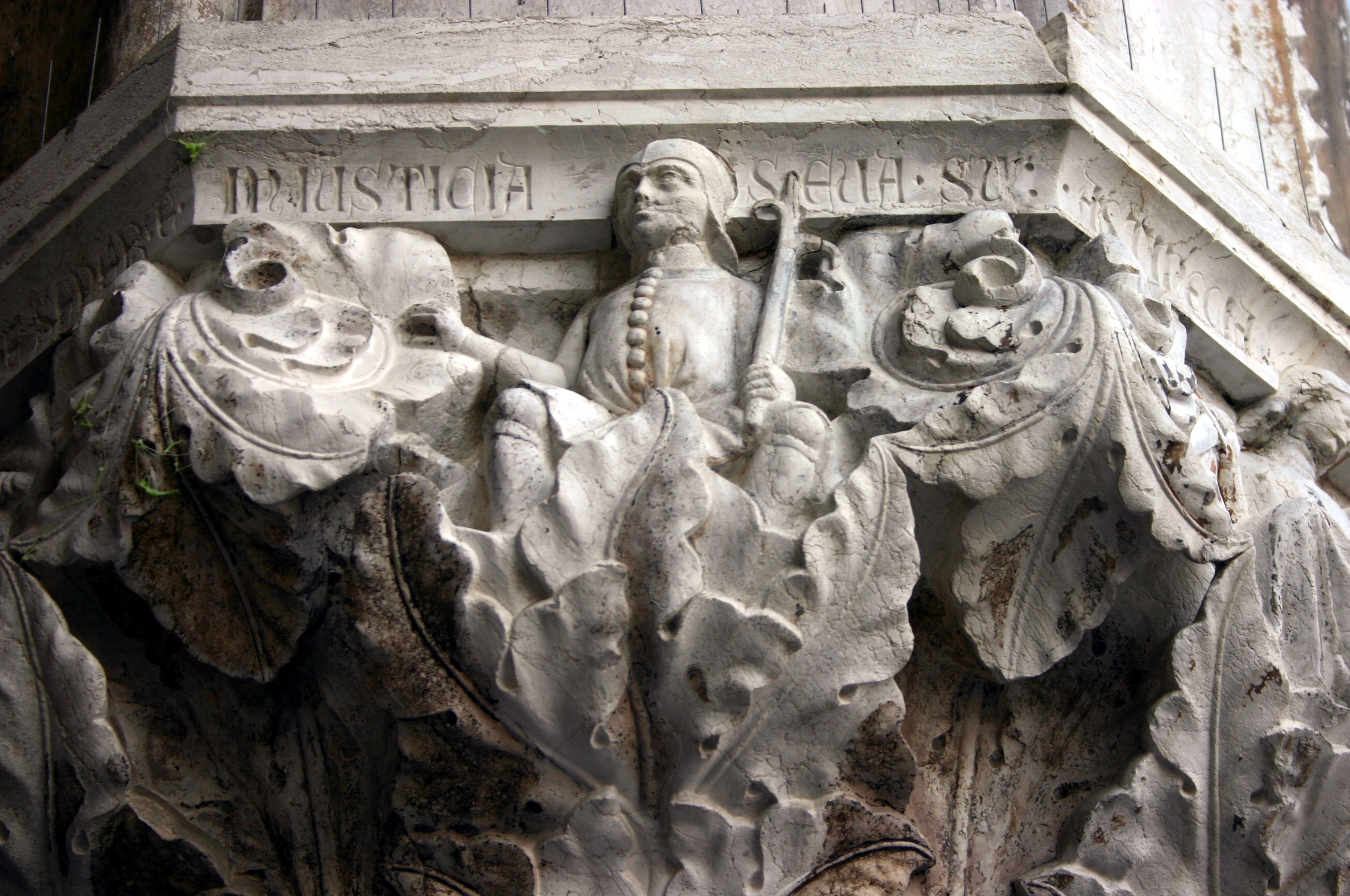
Injustice is in a series of allegorical capitals depicting vices and virtues at the Ducal Palace in Venice.

Injustice is a quality relating to unfairness or undeserved outcomes. The term may be applied in reference to a particular event or situation, or to a larger status quo. In Western philosophy and jurisprudence, injustice is very commonly—but not always—defined as either the absence or the opposite of justice.

The sense of injustice is a universal human feature, though the exact circumstances considered unjust can vary from culture to culture. While even acts of nature can sometimes arouse the sense of injustice, the sense is usually felt in relation to human action such as misuse, abuse, neglect, or malfeasance that is uncorrected or else sanctioned by a legal system or fellow human beings.

The sense of injustice can be a powerful motivational condition, causing people to take action not just to defend themselves but also others whom they perceive to be unfairly treated. Injustice within legal or societal standards is sometimes referred to as a two-tiered system.

== Relationship with justice ==
Professor Judith Shklar has written that Western philosophers tend to spend much more time discussing the concept of 'justice' rather than 'injustice'. On the other hand, she states that both historical writing and fiction use instances of injustice as their subject matter far more often than they use justice.

In philosophy and jurisprudence, the dominant view has been that injustice and justice are two sides of the same coin: that injustice is simply a lack of justice. This view has been challenged by professors including Shklar, Thomas W Simon and Eric Heinze, who consider that justice and injustice are independent qualities. So, in this minority view, you can increase the justice of a situation without reducing the injustice. Heinze has even gone as far as to argue that an increase in justice can actually cause an increase in injustice.

A relatively common view among philosophers and other writers is that while justice and injustice may be interdependent, it is injustice that is the primary quality. Many writers have written that, while it is hard to directly define or even perceive justice, it is easy to demonstrate that injustice can be perceived by all. According to von Hayek, the earliest known thinker to state that injustice is the primary quality was Heraclitus, whose view was echoed by Aristotle and dozens of others down the centuries. Hayek said that writers often express the idea that injustice is the primary concept "as though it were a new discovery", suggesting the view is rarely directly expressed in theories on Justice. But Hayek went on to say that legal positivism has proved that injustice, not justice, is the primary quality.

== Sense of injustice ==
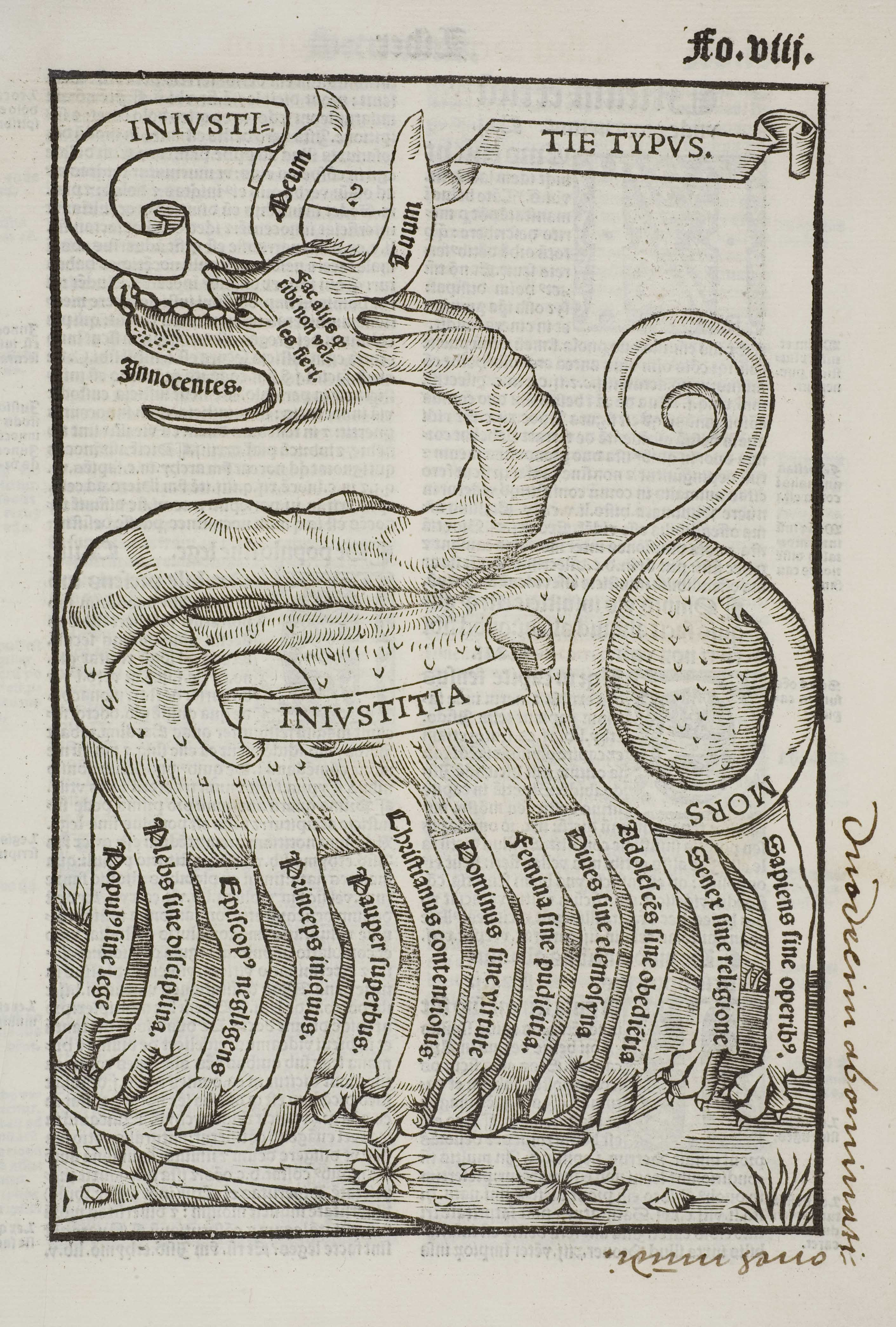
A metaphorical injustice eating the innocent in Guillaume Rouillé's Justicie atque Iniusticie. On the twelve legs of the beast is inscribed a variation of the twelve abuses of the De duodecim abusivis saeculi, claimed causes of injustice.

Scholars, including Judith Shklar, Edmond Cahn and Barrington Moore Jr. have surveyed anthropological and historical work on injustice, concluding that the sense of injustice is found in all human cultures; it is a human universal. These writers, and others like Simone Weil, Elizabeth Wolgast and Thomas W Simon, hold that the sense of injustice is a powerful motivational condition — unlike the sense of justice, which tends to be conceived in more abstract ways, and tends to inspire contemplation rather than action.

Cahn held that, for evolutionary reasons, humans who witness others being subjected to injustice can respond as though toward themselves. There can be an immediate, visceral activation of the fight-or-flight response. As American civil rights movement leader Martin Luther King Jr. wrote, in 1963, "injustice anywhere is a threat to justice everywhere". Spinner-Halev spoke about enduring injustices where it will still persist to this day without any action to address them. A 2012 study published in Psychological Science found that even babies have a sense of injustice and dislike having it violated, even when they witness events that do not directly effect them.

In the field of jurisprudence, Cahn has argued that lawyers should know how to rouse a jury's sense of injustice — something best done by appeals to the particular, not by abstractions or boilerplate type statements. Barrington Moore asserts that the reasons why populations often submit to oppression for long periods of time is that they consider it inevitable and so their sense of injustice is not aroused. He says that a widely shared sense of injustice is an essential, though not sufficient, cause of rebellion. Writers including Simone Weil, Elizabeth Wolgast and Judith Shklar have said that an aroused sense of injustice can be an essential prerequisite to action needed for protecting the weak and afflicted.

== Causes ==
A common cause of injustice is human selfishness. As Plato described at length in The Republic, people will often commit acts of injustice when they calculate it is in their interests to do so. Plato also adds that "The highest reach of injustice is to be deemed just when you are not". Human injustice is not always caused by attempt to gain unfair advantage or malice; it may be simply the result of the flawed human decision making. With the hungry judge effect for example, studies have found that judges sitting on review boards are less likely to reach decisions favorable to applicants depending on how long since the judges had their last food break. Misuse and abuse with regard to a particular case or context may represent a systemic failure to serve the cause of justice (cf. legal vacuum).

== In popular culture ==
- The Life of Emile Zola (1937), about the conviction of Émile Zola
- Beyond Reasonable Doubt (1982), about the conviction of Arthur Allan Thomas
- The Great Gold Swindle (1984), about the conviction of the Mickleberg brothers
- The Thin Blue Line (1988), about the conviction of Randall Dale Adams
- In the Name of the Father (1993), about the conviction of Gerry Conlon of the Guildford pub bombings
- The Fugitive (1993)
- The Crucible (1996), about the Salem witchcraft trials
- The Hurricane (1999), about the conviction of Rubin Carter
- The Great Mint Swindle (2012), also about the conviction of the Mickleberg brothers
- Making a Murderer (2015), about the conviction of Steven Avery

== See also ==
- Climate justice
- Environmental justice
- Establishing equitable power relationships
- Global justice
- Peacebuilding
- Rule According to Higher Law
- Rule of law
- Social inequality
- Social justice
- Urban forest inequity
