= Colin Lovitt =

Australian barrister

Colin Lovitt QC
- Born: Colin Leslie Lovitt; March 17, 1945
- Died: January 10, 2021 (aged 75)
- Occupation: Barrister
- Years active: 1969–2015
- Employer: Victorian Bar
- Known for: Criminal defence advocacy
- Spouse: Margaret Lovitt
- Children: 2

Colin Lovitt was a Queen's Counsel in Australia. He was known for defending Greg Domaszewicz and for getting in trouble for calling magistrate Bruce Zahner a 'cretin'. He represented Sudo Cavkic, charged with the murder of Keith William Allan, at the long-running second trial in 2006 that resulted in a hung jury, and at the similarly long third trial in 2007 when Cavkic was convicted. In the Hancock case, he defended Grame "Slim" Slater.

== Early life ==
Colin Leslie Lovitt was born on 17 March 1945. His father, Ron Lovitt, was a photographer and later picture editor at The Age. As a young man Lovitt showed an aptitude for mathematics, though a weakness in physics steered him toward the humanities and ultimately the law, rather than the career in journalism that his upbringing might have suggested.

== Career ==
Lovitt was admitted to practise law in 1969 and called to the Victorian Bar the following year, reading with the late John Fogarty AM. He went on to become a prominent figure at the Criminal Bar Association, eventually serving as its chairman and becoming a founding and life member of the organisation. He was appointed Queen's Counsel in 1988. In 2012, he was named a legend of the Victorian Bar.

Over a 45-year career Lovitt appeared in approximately 200 murder trials, establishing a reputation as one of Australia's foremost criminal defence barristers. The Victorian Bar described him as someone who was generous with his time and guided less experienced colleagues, particularly junior barristers. He also acted pro bono on a number of occasions, including during the Jaidyn Leskie trial, when he and his defence team worked without fee for ten weeks rather than accept a reduced legal aid payment.

=== Mark "Chopper" Read ===
Among Lovitt's notable acquittals was that of Mark "Chopper" Read, whom he defended on a murder charge - the first occasion Read had ever entered a not guilty plea. In 1987, Read had shot Sammy "The Turk" Ozerkam outside a St Kilda nightclub at close range. Read maintained it was self-defence. Lovitt chose not to call his client to give evidence, reasoning that Read's well-documented history of violence posed too great a risk in the witness box. The jury heard Read utter only two words during the entire trial: "not guilty". The acquittal surprised many observers, Read himself included.

=== Jaidyn Leskie case ===
Lovitt represented Greg Domaszewicz, who was charged with the murder of Moe toddler Jaidyn Leskie, who disappeared in June 1997. Domaszewicz was acquitted of both murder and manslaughter. Lovitt later reflected that while the case attracted enormous public attention, he considered the evidence against his client comparatively weak, though he noted that the pre-trial publicity had made conviction a real possibility regardless. He declined for many years to discuss the substance of the case publicly, citing the emotional damage still felt by those involved.

=== Gypsy Jokers and the Hancock bombing ===
Lovitt defended Graeme Slater, sergeant-at-arms of the Gypsy Jokers motorcycle club, who was charged with the 2001 car bombing murders of former Western Australian detective Don Hancock and his associate Lou Lewis. The prosecution case rested heavily on the testimony of fellow Gypsy Joker Sidney "Snot" Reid, who had broken the club's code of silence. Lovitt's cross-examination of Reid was widely credited with undermining his credibility before the jury, and Slater was acquitted. Lovitt's involvement in the case had broader origins: his record of success in West Australian courts had made him a preferred choice for outlaw motorcycle club members facing serious charges in that state. Fellow barrister Peter Searle noted that both he and Lovitt had faced significant professional and personal pressure during their challenges to alleged police corruption in Western Australia in the 1980s and 1990s.

=== Other notable cases ===
Lovitt also appeared for one of three defendants charged with the 1978 murder of underworld figure Les Kane, a case he later described as the most significant organised crime trial of that decade. He represented clients across a wide spectrum, from high-profile figures such as Gina Rinehart to individuals he defended without charge. In 2003 he was fined $10,000 after referring to a Queensland magistrate as a "complete cretin" in open court.

=== Retirement ===
Lovitt retired from the Bar in 2015 at the age of 70, having long planned to do so at that milestone. He had been working on a memoir about his career at the time of his death, with publication expected within a year of a 2016 interview.

== Personal life ==
Lovitt was a long-term resident of Carlton, and a devoted supporter of Carlton Football Club, where he was known to former club president John Elliott, who referred to him simply as "Barrister".

He married Margaret, with whom he had two sons, Marcus and Zane.

== Death ==
Colin Lovitt died on 10 January 2021, aged 75. Victorian Supreme Court Justice Lex Lasry paid tribute, describing Lovitt as one of the bar's outstanding personalities and a formidable practitioner in criminal defence.
