= Justice sensitivity =

Personality trait concerning injustice

Justice sensitivity is a personality trait describing individual differences in how readily people perceive injustice and how strongly they respond to it cognitively, emotionally, and behaviorally. Researchers distinguish victim, observer, beneficiary, and perpetrator sensitivity according to a person's role in an unjust event; the four perspectives share a concern with justice but differ in their characteristic reactions and behavioral associations. The perspectives are measured with the Justice Sensitivity Inventory and have been studied in relation to social behavior, information processing, and development.

== Concept ==
Justice sensitivity describes a person's tendency to notice injustice and the strength of the thoughts, emotions, and actions that follow. It has been described as a relatively stable personality trait. Justice sensitivity is related to broader personality characteristics but has been found to be distinct from them.

Researchers distinguish four perspectives according to a person's role in an unjust event: victim, observer, beneficiary, and perpetrator sensitivity. The four perspectives share a concern with justice, but that concern is expressed in different ways. The perspectives are associated with different emotional reactions: victim sensitivity with anger, observer sensitivity with moral outrage, and beneficiary and perpetrator sensitivity with guilt or shame. When a social situation is uncertain and exploitation is possible, higher victim sensitivity is also linked to anticipating exploitation and holding back cooperation. Observer sensitivity is associated with punishing perpetrators and supporting victims. Beneficiary and perpetrator sensitivity are associated with guilt and with efforts to compensate victims.

Victim sensitivity centers on unfairness directed at oneself and includes a self-protective element. People higher in victim sensitivity has been associated with stronger intentions to protest and seek redress after perceived mistreatment. Victim sensitivity has been correlated with suspiciousness and distrust, whereas observer and beneficiary sensitivity have been positively correlated with empathy, role taking, and social responsibility. Across three studies, beneficiary sensitivity was associated with prosocial and less antisocial behavior, while victim sensitivity showed the reverse pattern for the outcomes studied.

Observer, beneficiary, and perpetrator sensitivity have been associated with adherence to justice standards even when doing so involves temptation, personal costs, or a risk of exploitation.

== Measurement and effects ==
The Justice Sensitivity Inventory contains separate scales for victim, observer, beneficiary, and perpetrator sensitivity. Each scale contains ten items rated on a six-point scale from 0 ("not at all") to 5 ("exactly"). One study used a representative sample of 2,510 people drawn from the German population. Confirmatory factor analyses in that study supported the factorial validity of the scales. Although beneficiary and perpetrator sensitivity were highly correlated, model comparisons supported treating them as distinct constructs.

In one experiment using the observer-sensitivity scale, participants with higher scores tended to see an ambiguous target as less just, both without priming and after an injustice prime. Short two-item measures have also been developed for all four perspectives. A 2022 paper proposed a theoretical framework for justice sensitivity in intergroup settings, including conflicts over status, rights, and resources. The authors cautioned that empirical evidence in intergroup contexts was still limited.

Justice sensitivity has also been linked to how justice-related information is processed. The processed information appeared to be specific to justice-related information rather than to negatively or positively valenced information more generally. In a 2011 series of three studies, the main analyses focused on observer sensitivity. Higher observer-sensitivity scores were associated with stronger attention to unjust stimuli and with less-just interpretations of ambiguous situations. They were also associated with better memory for unjust information.

=== ADHD symptoms and related problems ===
A 2016 review reported that justice sensitivity was correlated with symptoms of attention deficit hyperactivity disorder (ADHD) among children and adolescents. The same review linked victim sensitivity to more severe and worsening emotional and behavioral problems, while perpetrator sensitivity showed the opposite pattern.

== Development ==
Justice sensitivity has been studied in children and adolescents. One longitudinal study followed 1,122 German participants aged 9 to 18 for 1–2 years. Stability increased from childhood into early adolescence for all three perspectives studied, then declined among older adolescents for observer and perpetrator sensitivity. The authors described childhood and adolescence as important periods for the stabilization and differentiation of the perspectives.
