= Perth Mint Swindle =

Gold stealing occurrence in Perth, Western Australia

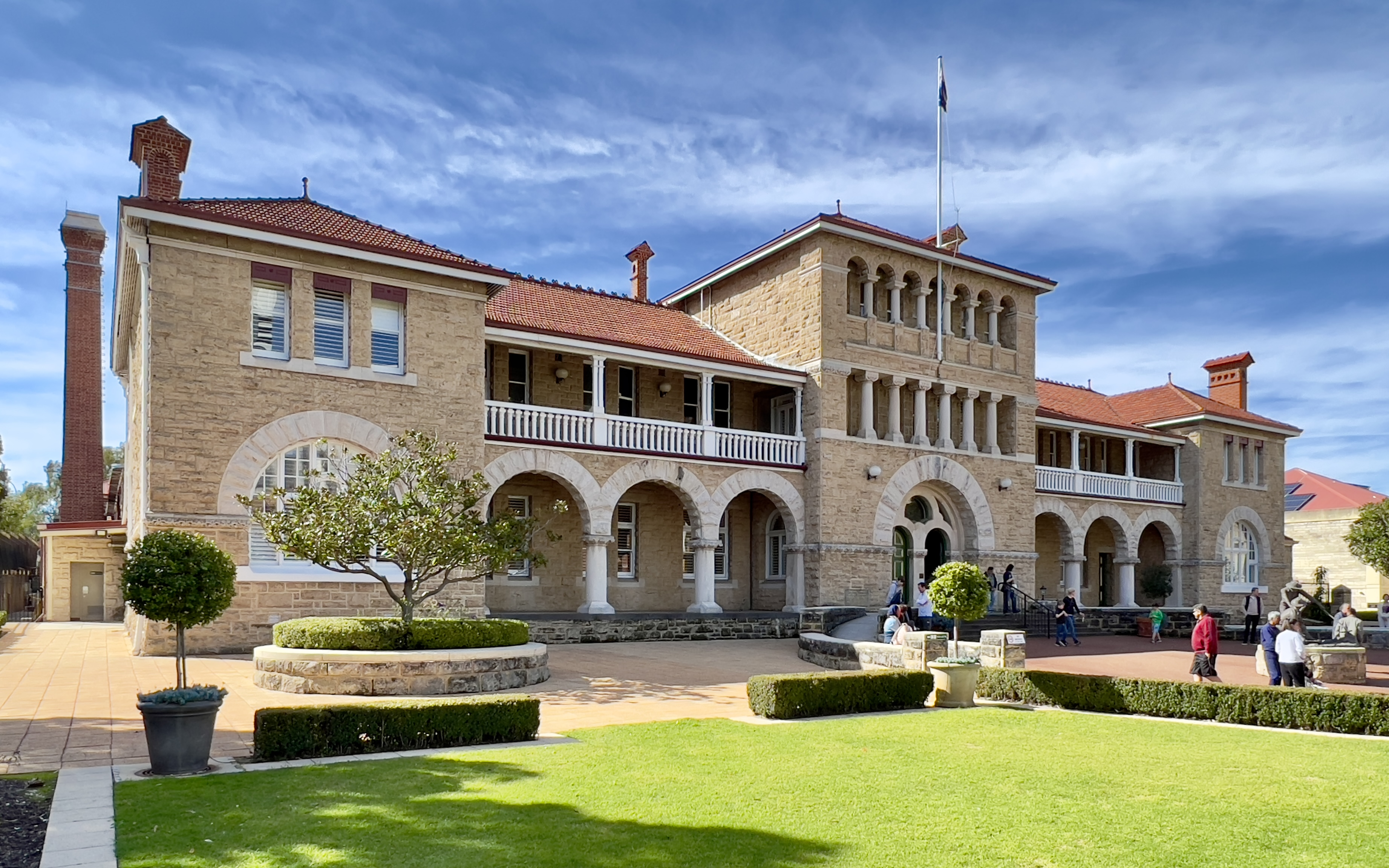
Perth Mint

The Perth Mint Swindle was a robbery of 49 gold bars weighing 69 kg (152 lb; 2,200 ozt) from the Perth Mint in Western Australia on 22 June 1982. The bullion was valued at A$653,000 at that time (equivalent to $2,587,607 in 2022). As of November 2024, the value of 68 kg (150 lb; 2,200 ozt) of gold would be in excess of A$8.4 million. According to police at the time, three brothers—Ray, Peter, and Brian Mickelberg—orchestrated the robbery. The three went to trial and were found guilty of the conspiracy, and sentenced in 1983, with Ray for 20 years, Peter for 16 years and Brian for 12 years incarceration.

All three convictions were overturned in 2004. To date, the case remains unsolved and continues to be fought by the Mickelbergs who maintain their innocence and allege a conspiracy by the Western Australia Police to frame them.

== Mickelberg brothers ==
Soon after the robbery, investigations focused on the Mickelberg brothers. According to the police, the brothers stole cheques from a Perth building society and then fooled the mint into accepting those cheques in exchange for gold bullion which, it was alleged, the brothers had a courier pick up. The gold was picked up by a security company who delivered it to an office in Perth and then to Jandakot Airport, from where it seemingly disappeared.

In a separate matter, in September 1982, the three brothers, their parents and another man, Brian Pozzi, were charged over a matter relating to a manufactured gold nugget known as the "Yellow Rose of Texas". Perth Businessman Alan Bond had purchased the nugget for $350,000 in November 1980. It was later found to be worth less than $150,000, and Raymond Mickelberg and Brian Pozzi pleaded guilty to charges of conspiracy to fraud at their June 1984 trial.

After serving nine months of his jail term and having his conviction overturned on appeal, Brian was released from jail but died in a light aircraft crash on 27 February 1986 when the twin-engined Aero Commander he was flying ran out of fuel near Canning Dam on the outskirts of Perth. Whilst in prison, Ray and Peter embarked on a series of seven appeals against their convictions, essentially on the grounds that their confessions had been fabricated by police investigators. Ray and Peter served eight and six years of their sentences, respectively, before being released on parole.

In 1989, 55 kg (121 lb; 1,800 ozt) of gold pellets, said to have been from the swindle, were found outside the gates of TVW-7 (currently Channel Seven Perth), a Perth television station, with an anonymous note addressed to one of the station's reporters—Alison Fan—protesting the Mickelbergs' innocence and claiming that a prominent Perth businessman was behind the swindle.

== The Police officers ==
=== Don Hancock ===
The senior investigating officer in the case was Detective-Sergeant Don Hancock, who was later promoted to head of the State Criminal Investigation Bureau (CIB). Hancock and a friend, Lou Lewis, died in a bomb explosion outside Hancock's home in Lathlain in September 2001.

=== Tony Lewandowski ===
In 2002, midway through a State Royal Commission into police corruption, a retired police officer, Tony Lewandowski, who had been at the centre of the case, made a confession of his involvement in fabricating evidence which was used to help frame the brothers. Lewandowski's senior officer during the investigation was Don Hancock. The two were the only people present at the brothers' interviews following the Mickelburgh arrests.

"(On that day), Don Hancock came into the room and told me to make Peter strip naked. Don then went up to Peter and gave him two or three quick punches in the solar plexus. The statements purportedly taken from Peter Mickelberg on 26 July 1982, were in fact not taken in Peter's presence that day, but were a fabrication made by Don Hancock and myself shortly after 2 September 1982. I gave evidence at the trial and numerous appeals. All that evidence in relation to the so-called confessions was false." —Statement of Tony Lewandowski

Lewandowski was subsequently charged with attempting to pervert the course of justice, making false statements, fabricating evidence and perjury. In May 2004, just before facing trial, Lewandowski apparently committed suicide. Although now dead, Lewandowski's confession directly implicated Hancock in fabricating evidence in the Mickelberg case.

== Convictions quashed ==
In July 2004, the Western Australian Court of Criminal Appeal quashed the brothers' convictions after seven unsuccessful attempts. The judge ruled that with the suppression of their sentence, they were entitled to a presumption of innocence. The Assistant Police Commissioner, Mel Hay, expressed disappointment with the decision which prompted a threat of a defamation lawsuit from the brothers. The brothers subsequently sued the Western Australian government for libel and, as part of the settlement, the Western Australian police issued a public apology in December 2007.

After lodgment of the brothers' claims for compensation, in January 2008 state attorney-general Jim McGinty offered $500,000 in ex-gratia payments to each brother for the "injustice done to them". The payments followed $658,672 paid to cover legal costs of their two appeals. The Mickelbergs' lawyer had asked for $950,000 in compensation for Ray and $750,000 for Peter. The ex-gratia payments were accepted in good faith but, in 2016, under a different attorney-general, Michael Mischin, the state's Legal Aid Commission attempted to recover $145,353 from Raymond Mickelberg, an action which quickly lapsed as unlawful.

== Books about the case ==
Author Avon Lovell wrote a book, The Mickelberg Stitch, about the case in 1985, which alleged questionable investigation practices by the police, including production of unsigned confessions and a forged fingerprint. The police union collected a levy of $1 per week from each member to fund legal action against Lovell and his publishers and distributors to suppress publication of the book. It was estimated that between one and two million dollars was raised. The book was banned by the State Government, but was still freely available to be read at the J S Battye Library. The ban was eventually lifted.

A second book by Lovell, Split Image, was published in 1990 and met a similar fate to the first. This ban was also lifted later.

In March 2011, Lovell launched a third book on the case, Litany of Lies, at about the same time that Antonio Buti wrote on the subject.

== In popular culture ==
Two telemovies based on the swindle have been made.

- The Great Gold Swindle (1984), directed by John Power and written by David White; featuring John Hargreaves (Ray Mickelberg), Tony Rickards (Peter Mickelberg), Robert Hughes (Brian Mickelberg), Bryan Marshall (Hancock), Chris Haywood (Peter Duvnjak), Steve Jodrell (Chris Hunt), Robert Faggetter (Det. Sgt. Hooft) and Bill McCluskey (Terence Henry). This version was also broadcast in Brazil, under the title A Grande Fraude, and was released on video in France as Les mercenaires de l'or.
- The Great Mint Swindle (2012), directed by Geoff Bennett, written by Reg Cribb and Paul Bennett; featuring Grant Bowler (Ray Mickelberg), Todd Lasance (Peter Mickelberg), Josh Quong Tart (Brian Mickelberg), Shane Bourne (Hancock), John Batchelor (Lewandowski), Maya Stange (Sheryl Mickelberg) which aired on 11 March 2012.

One actor, Caroline McKenzie, appeared in both features, playing Detective Ljiljana Cvijic in the 1984 version and Peg Mickelberg in 2012.

== See also ==
- Crime in Western Australia
- List of miscarriage of justice cases
- Shirley Finn
