= John Batchelor (actor) =

Australian actor

John David Batchelor
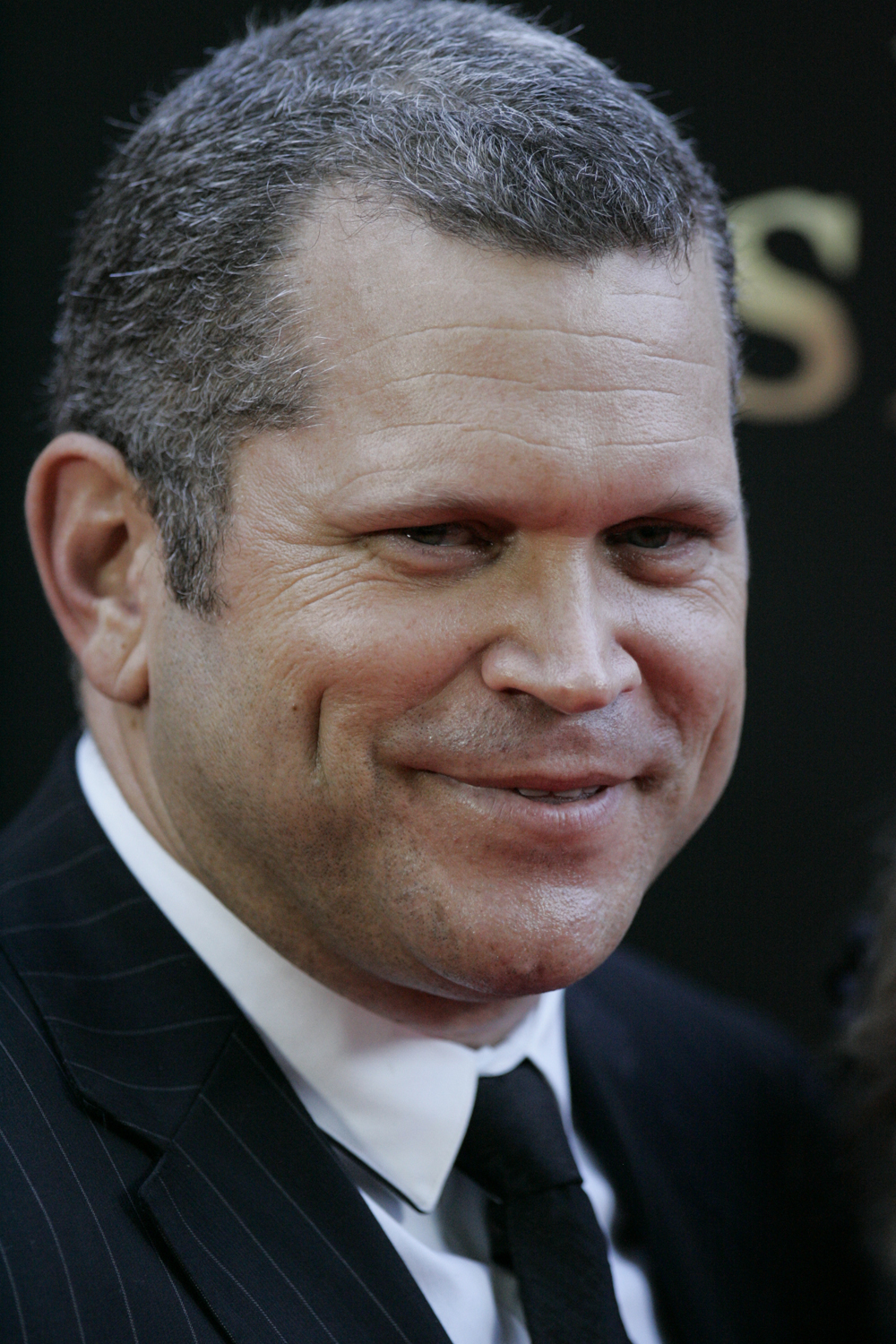
- Batchelor in 2012
- Born: 25 September 1969 (age 57); Singapore
- Other name: John Bachelor
- Occupations: Actor, voice actor, comedian, narrator
- Years active: 1993 - present

John David Batchelor (born 25 September 1969) is a Singaporean-born Australian television and film actor. He is most known for portraying Chief Petty Officer Marine Technical (CPOMT) / Chief Engineer Andy 'Charge' Thorpe on the Australian drama series Sea Patrol, and Peeto in the Australian feature film Red Dog.

== Early life ==
Batchelor was born in Singapore to Australian parents.

He nearly died from a bacterial infection at age 3. After passing out from a cardiac arrest in the emergency room in Melbourne Children's Hospital, he was revived with CPR and it took him 3 months to recover.

As a child, Batchelor and his family moved around frequently, as his father was a high-ranking officer in the Australian army. When he turned 7, he moved to Brisbane Australia where he spent most of his childhood. He acted in many plays there including And a Nightingale Sang, Jacques and his Master, Bouncers, Cyrano de Bergerac, Macbeth, A Midsummer Night's Dream, The Shaughraun, Sweet Phoebe, Julius Caesar and The Misanthrope. He was awarded 2 State Theatre Awards (Matilda Awards) before returning to Sydney, Australia.

== Career ==
Batchelor graduated from Australia's National Institute of Dramatic Art (NIDA) with a degree in Performing Arts (Acting) in 1992.

Besides portraying the regular role of Andy Thorpe on Sea Patrol, Batchelor has had guest roles on numerous TV series including All Saints, Water Rats, Stingers, and Murder Call. He appeared in the 2003 films, Inspector Gadget 2 and Danny Deckchair, and in the 2008 film The Tender Hook.

Batchelor also had a minor role as a bodyguard in the Australian comedy film Fat Pizza.

In 2011, Batchelor starred as Peeto in the Australian film Red Dog and also portrayed the heart wrenching Wally Tomlinson, an associate of underworld figure Kate Leigh in the highly acclaimed Nine Network series Underbelly: Razor.

In 2012, Batchelor's first main role for the year was as policeman Tony Lewandowski in the Nine Network telemovie, The Great Mint Swindle, the tale about the three innocent Mickelberg brothers who became embroiled in one of the most famous heists in Australia's history.

In 2013 Batchelor became a voice over artist and begun his voice work including as the narrator for Air Rescue on Channel 7 and numerous vehicle commercials.

== Personal life ==
Batchelor lives in Sydney, Australia, with his family. He has a son, Jack Batchelor and a daughter, Ella Batchelor.

== Awards and nominations ==
Year	Nominated work	Award	Category	Result
1995	The Lotus Room	Exposure Film Festival	Accolade Comedy Actor	Won
1995	Millfire & Christmas at Turkey Beach	Matilda Awards	Outstanding Achievement in Queensland Theatre	Won
1997	Sweet Phoebe & Oz Shorts	Matilda Awards	Outstanding Achievement in Queensland Theatre	Won
1997	The Oblong Box	Queensland New Filmmakers Awards	Best Actor	Won

== Filmography ==
=== Television ===
Year	Title	Role	Notes
2022	Barons	Bruce Hewitt	TV series, 2 episodes
2019-20	Reckoning	Detective Purcell	TV miniseries, 2 episodes
2019	Harrow	Clayton Pike	TV series, 1 episode
2018	Black Comedy	Guest Cast	TV series, 2 episodes
2016-17	The Secret Daughter	Nick Mackay	TV series, 6 episodes
2017	True Story with Hamish & Andy	Jerry	TV series, 1 episode
2016	Doctor Doctor	Nathan	TV series, season 1, 6 episodes
2016	Brock	Larry Perkins	TV series, 2 episodes
2015	Australia The Story of Us	Lang Hancock	TV series, 1 episode
2014	Rake	Digger/Senior Cop	TV series, 1 episode
2012-13	Home and Away	Winston Markman	TV series, 14 episodes
2012	Devil's Dust	Jack Rush QC	TV series, 2 episodes
2011	Underbelly: Razor	Wally Tomlinson	TV series, 13 episodes
2007-11	Sea Patrol	Andy 'Charge' Thorpe	TV series, 68 episodes
2011	Laid	Boss	TV series, 1 episode
2009	30 seconds	Bobo	TV series, 1 episode
2004	Roll	Tony Veneto	
2003	Fat Pizza	Bouncer	TV series
2002	Bad Cop, Bad Cop	Uncle Dan	TV series, 1 episode
2000-02	All Saints	Bernie Farrely / Wayne Calder	TV series, 2 episodes
2000	Marriage Acts	Constable	TV movie
1999-02	Stingers	Colin Fletcher / Greg Crowley	TV series, 2 episodes
1999	Farscape	Kcrackic	TV series, 1 episode
1998	Water Rats	Eric Bourke	TV series, 2 episodes
1998	Murder Call	Wayne Pax	TV series, season 2, episode 6: Cold Comfort
1997	The Wayne Manifesto	Mr Scudamore	TV series, 1 episode
1995	Fire	Barney	TV series
1994	Time Trax	Harry	TV series, 1 episode

=== Film ===
Year	Title	Role	Notes
2023	The Appleton Ladies' Potato Race	Billy Pearce	Feature film
2023	Dinner Expectations	John	Short film
2022	The Longest Weekend	Mark Palmer	
2021	Peter Rabbit 2: The Runaway	Farmer Busby	Feature film
2020	Groundhog Night	Gary	Short film
2019	The Whistleblower	Harrison	
2018	Chasing Comets	Coach Munsey	Feature film
2016	3010 The Righteous Path	Victor Koering	Short film
2015	12 Steps	Ben	Short film
2015	Turn	Joseph O'Kane	
2014	Project: One Shot		
2012	Huge	Barry	
2012	The Great Mint Swindle	Tony Lewandowski	TV film
2011	The Example	Chris	
2011	Boys on Film 6: Pacific Rim	Mal Logan	
2011	Red Dog	Peeto	Feature film
2009	Subdivision	Pete	Feature film
2009	Franswa Sharl	Mal Logan	
2008	The Tender Hook	Ronnie	Feature film
2006	Final Call	Jim Watson	
2005	Man-Thing	Wayne Thibadeaux	Feature film
2005	Splintered	Guard Duncan	
2004	In Too Deep	Fisherman	Short film
2003	Ned	Shopkeeper	Feature film
2003	Danny Deckchair	Pete	Feature film
2003	Inspector Gadget 2	McKibble	Feature film
2000	The Edge of Quarrel		
2000	The Monkey's Mask	Steve (uncredited)	Feature film
2000	Bored Olives	Mr Maxwell	
2000	The Three Stooges	Curly Wannabee	TV film
2000	Sunday	Todd Markel	
1997	The Tower	Eric	
1996	Mr. Reliable	Chubby Cop	Feature film
1994	The Roly Poly Man	Axel	Feature film
1993	The Custodian	Waiter	Feature film

== Theatre ==
Year	Title	Role	Venue / Company
1992	The Heiress	Dr Austin Sloper	NIDA Parade Theatre, Sydney
1992	Alcestic	Chorus	NIDA Parade Theatre, Sydney
1992	As You Like It	Duke Frederick / William	NIDA Parade Theatre, Sydney
1992	Images de Moliere		NIDA Parade Theatre, Sydney
1993	The Shaughraun or The Loveable Rascal	Smuggler	Suncorp Theatre, Brisbane with Queensland Theatre
1994	Jacques and His Master	Master	Van Gogh's Ear Lobe, Brisbane with On Giant's Shoulders
1994	Cyrano de Bergerac	Le Bret	Acronym
1995	Dog Handler's Dream	Meade	Experimento & Playlab
1995	Bouncers	Les	Theatre Up North
1996	A Midsummer Night’s Dream	Bottom	Grin and Tonic, Brisbane
1996	Macbeth	Macbeth	Grin and Tonic, Brisbane
1995	Christmas at Turkey Beach	Max	Suncorp Theatre, Brisbane with Queensland Theatre
1995	Millfire	Champ	Queensland Theatre with On Giant's Shoulders
1996	A Doctor in Spite of Himself	Sganerelle	QUT, Brisbane
1996	Witches I and II		Grin and Tonic, Brisbane
1996	Bouncers	Lucky Eric	La Boite Theatre, Brisbane with Someone Theatre Company
1997	West Side Story	Officer Krupke	QUT
1997	Mr Melancholy	Ollie	La Boite Theatre, Brisbane
1997	Sweet Phoebe	Fraser	La Boite Theatre, Brisbane with Someone Theatre Company
1997	Solitary Animals	Grev	Metro Arts, Brisbane with Renegade Theatre
1997	The Misanthrope	Alceste	Old Church site, Paddington, Brisbane with Green Theatre Productions
1997	QTC Oz Shorts 1	Various	Cremorne Theatre, Brisbane with Queensland Theatre
1997	Julius Caesar	Cinna	Queensland Theatre
1998	Deathwatch	Greeneyes	Old Fitzroy Theatre, Sydney
1999	She Stoops to Conquer	Diggory	Sydney Opera House with STC
2000	Troilus and Cressida	Ajax	Melbourne Athenaeum, Playhouse, Canberra, Sydney Opera House with Bell Shakespeare
2001	Julius Caesar	Decius Brutus / Titinius	Sydney Opera House, Wagga Wagga Civic Theatre, Orange Civic Theatre, Playhouse, Melbourne, Playhouse, Canberra, Theatre Royal, Hobart, Geelong Arts Centre, Newcastle Civic Theatre, His Majesty's Theatre, Perth with Bell Shakespeare
2001	Antony and Cleopatra	Enobarbus	Sydney Opera House, IMB Theatre, Wollongong, Playhouse, Melbourne, Playhouse, Canberra, Riverside Theatres Parramatta with Bell Shakespeare
2003	The Way of the World	Witwoud	STC
2004	The Underpants	Theo	Glen Street Theatre, Sydney, Playhouse, Brisbane, Orange Civic Theatre, Newcastle Civic Theatre, Laycock Street Theatre, Gosford, Lismore City Hall, Bathurst Memorial Entertainment Centre, IMB Theatre, Wollongong, Playhouse, Canberra with Company B Belvoir
2004	Twelfth Night	Sir Toby Belch	Playhouse, Melbourne, Playhouse, Canberra, Illawarra Performing Arts Centre, Sydney Opera House, Orange Civic Theatre with Bell Shakespeare
2005	Harry the Sixth		Sydney Opera House with Bell Shakespeare
2005	Edward IV		Sydney Opera House with Bell Shakespeare
2005	Wars of the Roses	Gloucester / Stafford / Iden / Oxford	Sydney Opera House, Playhouse, Canberra, His Majesty's Theatre, Perth, Playhouse, Melbourne with Bell Shakespeare
2005	Festen	Helmut	Sydney Opera House with STC
2006	Romeo and Juliet	Capulet	Playhouse, Canberra, Playhouse, Melbourne, Sydney Opera House with Bell Shakespeare
2012	Managing Carmen	Rohan Swift	Playhouse, Brisbane, Heath Ledger Theatre, Perth with Black Swan Theatre Company & Queensland Theatre
2018	The Dead Devils of Cockle Creek	Mickey O'Toole	Roundhouse Theatre, Brisbane with La Boite Theatre Company
2018	Saint Joan		Roslyn Packer Theatre, Sydney with STC
2019	Storm Boy	Hideaway Tom	Southbank Theatre, Melbourne, Playhouse, Brisbane with MTC & Queensland Theatre
2022	Top Coat	Barry / Jeremy	Wharf Theatre with STC
2022–23	Holding Achilles	Odysseus	Playhouse, Brisbane for Brisbane Festival & Sydney Festival
2024	The Odd Couple	Roy / Oscar	Theatre Royal, Sydney
