= The Turning (play) =

The Turning is a play written by Bill McCluskey, based on The Turning, a publication of connected short stories by Australian writer Tim Winton. It spans from 1970–2001 in Western Australia, covering much of the life of protagonist Vic Lang.

== Synopsis ==
In the 1970s, drug trafficking in the town of Angelus leads to the presence of Demons – corrupt police officers. The darkness underneath Angelus has a profound impact on the increasingly paranoid Vic Lang, son of honest police officer Bob Lang, and 'Slack' Jackie Martin, girlfriend of drugrunner 'Boner' McPharlin. The story of the Lang family and Jackie is extended into 2000, where the shadow that haunts Vic begins to have an impact upon his marriage to Gail.

== Adaptation ==
The town of Angelus is an allusion to the town of Albany in Western Australia.

Short stories from the publication The Turning that are adapted directly into scenes are:

- Act 1 Scene 2 - Abbreviation
- Act 1 Scene 3 - Damaged Goods
- Act 1 Scene 4 - Boner McPharlin's Moll
- Act 1 Scene 7 - Immunity
- Act 2 Scene 7 - The Turning
- Act 3 Scene 2 - On Her Knees
- Act 3 Scene 5 - Reunion
- Act 3 Scene 6 - Commission

== Productions ==
The show was first staged at the Playhouse Theatre, Perth by the Perth Theatre Company from 22 February – 8 March 2008. It was commissioned for the Perth International Arts Festival and was directed by Steve Jodrell, with set and costume design by Sam Hobbs, lighting design by Joseph Mercurio, composition by Iain Grandage, sound design by Kingsley Reeve, image design by Jon Green, with Mel Cantwell as associate director and Anna Dymitr Hawkes as stage manager.

Original Cast

- Reg Cribb - Ernie Lang / Drug Squad Detective / Motel Manager
- Michelle Fornasier - Cleo Lang / Nurse / Daisy
- Caroline McKenzie - 'Nan' Lang
- Samantha Murray - Carol Lang / Jemma
- Nick Simpson-Deeks - Vic Lang
- Steve Turner - Bob Lang
- Alison van Reeken - Gail Lang / 'Slack' Jackie Martin
- Jai Courtney - 'Boner' McPharlin / Ken Kenneally / Fenn
- Pia Prendiville - 'Strawberry' Alison / Kathy / Melanie / Neve / Kalgoorlie Prostitute
