= The Great Mint Swindle =

Australian 2012 television film

- Promotional poster
- Written by: Paul Bennett; Reg Cribb
- Directed by: Geoff Bennett
- Starring: Shane Bourne; Grant Bowler; Todd Lasance; Josh Quong Tart
- Music by: Jim Moginie
- Country of origin: Australia
- Original language: English

Production
- Producers: Paul Bennett; Michael Cordell; Russell Vines
- Cinematography: Bruce Young
- Editor: Antonio Mestres
- Running time: 92 minutes

Original release
- Network: Nine Network
- Release: 11 March 2012

The Great Mint Swindle is a 2012 Australian television film directed by Geoff Bennett and starring Grant Bowler, Todd Lasance and Josh Quong Tart. It is based on the Perth Mint Swindle which took place in the 1980s.

== Plot summary ==
In the beginning of the 1980s boom in Western Australia, the Mickelberg brothers Ray (Grant Bowler), Peter (Todd Lasance) and Brian (Josh Quong Tart) spend their days looking for adventure and finding new ways to earn money. They purchase gold bars from the Perth Mint, with which they fabricate a gold nugget, dubbed the "Yellow Rose of Texas", which is purchased by tycoon Alan Bond (David Meadows) for substantially more than its gold value.

They are subsequently convicted of the unconnected theft of 49 gold bars from the Perth Mint, purchased by forged bank cheques. The film depicts Detective-Sergeant Don Hancock as the mastermind behind fabricating evidence and false confessions. For 20 years, the fight goes on to clear the Mickelberg brothers of the crime, which remains unsolved.

== Cast ==
- Grant Bowler as Ray Mickelberg
- Todd Lasance as Peter Mickelberg
- Josh Quong Tart as Brian Mickelberg
- Shane Bourne as Don Hancock
- John Batchelor as Tony Lewandowski
- Maya Stange as Sheryl Mickelberg
- Caroline McKenzie as Peg Mickelberg
- Abby Earl as Diana
- Talei Howell-Price as Fay Mickelberg

== Reception ==
The TV movie was viewed by 1.073 million viewers and ranked at 8th place.

== See also ==
- The Great Gold Swindle, a 1984 telemovie, also about the mint swindle
