= Caroline McKenzie =

Australian actress

- Occupations: Actress, academic
- Years active: 1980s–present
- Employer: Edith Cowan University
- Known for: Stage and television roles; faculty at WAAPA

Caroline McKenzie is an Australian stage and screen actress. She is a member of the theatre and dance faculty at the Western Australian Academy of Performing Arts at Edith Cowan University.

== Television ==
Her television work includes Ship to Shore, The Shark Net and The Sleepover Club.

She appeared in two TV films about the 1982 theft of gold bullion from the Perth Mint : The Great Gold Swindle (1984) as Detective Cvijic and The Great Mint Swindle (2012) as Peg Mickelberg.

== Theatre ==
Her theatre work includes:

- The 20s and All That Jazz, The Cherry Orchard, A Midsummer Night's Dream, Fen and Safety in Numbers for The Hole in the Wall Theatre.
- Godspell, Chicago, The Jack the Ripper Show, On Our Selection, A Chorus of Disapproval, Company, Sisterly Feelings and Barnum for The Playhouse Theatre (Perth) (productions broadcast on Australian National Theatre Live).
- The Philadelphia Story for Sydney Theatre Company.
- The Man From Mukinupin for Q Theatre.
- Ridin' High (as Ethel Merman) for Griffin Theatre Company.
- Face to Face (on tour around Australia and Brazil) and The Turning for Perth Theatre Company.
- The Crucible and Dust for the Black Swan State Theatre Company
- Coram Boy for the Midnite Youth Theatre Company.

== Reviews ==
A reviewer wrote of her performance in The Turning, "a malevolent matriarch as corrosive in her effect on a family as any military dictator on a nation's destiny. Caroline McKenzie's Nan, steely and precise in gesture, is a fine study in understated menace." A review of The Crucible said, "Caroline McKenzie delivers accuser Ann Putnam’s grief over her seven still-born babies with a pinch-faced intensity that almost makes her accusations understandable."
