= Ora Banda, Western Australia =

Ora Banda
- Town
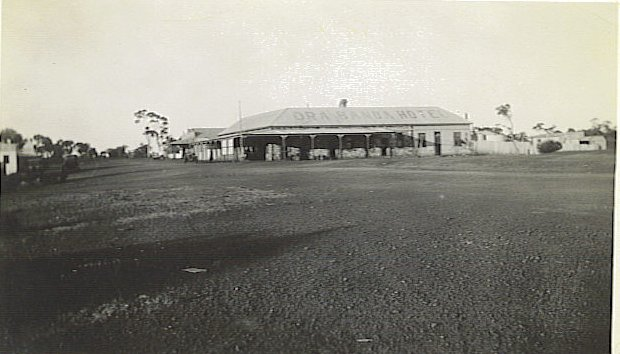
- The Ora Banda Hotel

- Interactive map of Ora Banda
- Coordinates: 30.38°S 121.06°E
- Country: Australia
- State: Western Australia
- LGA: City of Kalgoorlie-Boulder
- Location: 66 km (41 mi) north east of Kalgoorlie; 663 km (412 mi) east of Perth
- Established: 1912

Government
  - State electorate: Electoral district of Kalgoorlie
  - Federal division: O'Connor

Area
  - Total: 1,151.5 km^{2} (444.6 sq mi)
- Elevation: 449 m (1,473 ft)

Population
  - Total: 12 (SAL 2021)
- Postcode: 6431

Ora Banda is a townsite and locality in the Eastern Goldfields of Western Australia located 66 kilometres (41 mi) north-west of Kalgoorlie. The town name is Spanish meaning "band of gold". It includes several operational mines and at the 2016 Australian census had a population of eight people.

== History ==
Gold was discovered in the district in 1893, and in 1909 the Ora Banda Progress Committee requested that the government make additional lots available, but it was 1911 before a decision was made to declare a townsite there. The survey of lots was made in 1911, and the townsite gazetted in 1912. By 1910 there were approximately 2,000 miners and their families living in the area. The town had two stores, two butchers, two bakers, a town hall, dining halls, a post office, a police station, churches, boarding houses and billiards saloons.

The once famous Huntington Mills Bank was situated there; in its time it was the largest bank in the Southern Hemisphere. In 1911 the Ora Banda Hotel was constructed by Alfred E Garnett using stone and brick.

On 17 June 1913, Eileen Walls (13yrs old) led a procession of school children up the main street, and had the honour of cutting the ribbon and so officially opened the Ora Banda State Battery. The five head battery ran three shifts and in 1936 another five heads were added.

Water was supplied to the town by dams until the town was connected to the Goldfields Water Supply Scheme from Kalgoorlie in 1933.

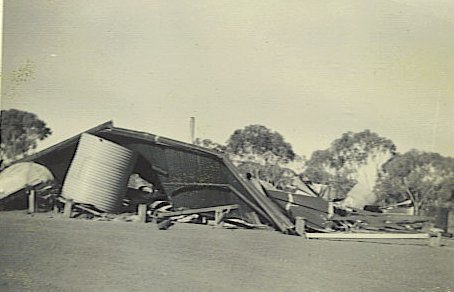
The Ora Banda school burnt down

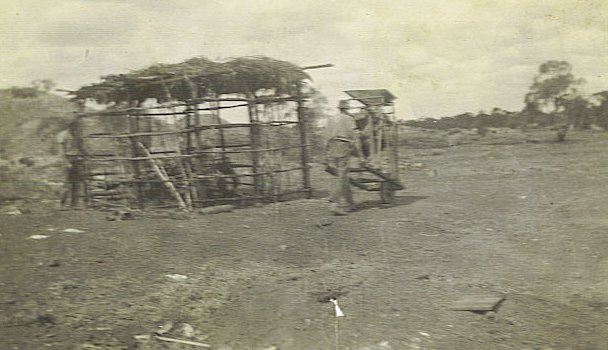
Living conditions were rough

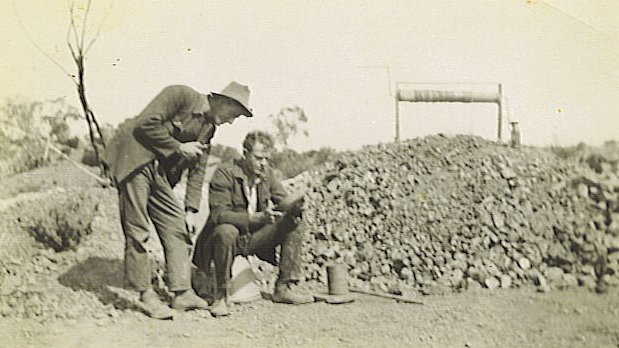
Mine shafts were scattered across the area

== Current ==
Today's gold mining companies are still working the same sites discovered nearly a century ago, and on the outskirts of town you will find the Ora Banda State Battery which is still used to crush ore.

Annually in September the population swells for a day for the Ora Banda Race Day. The race track is opposite the historical Ora Banda Inn.

The town hit the headlines in 2000 with the Hancock case. A Gypsy Joker, Billy Grierson, was fatally shot while sitting at a camp fire on the old town site. Former Criminal Investigation Bureau chief and Ora Banda hotel owner Don Hancock was suspected of the shooting and his properties were later fire-bombed. Hancock was later killed in a car bombing in 2001 in Perth in a revenge attack by a member of the Gypsy Jokers.

In the early hours of the morning of 18 May 2019, the hotel was destroyed by fire.

In August 2020 an impact crater was found near Ora Banda. The meteorite crater is estimated to be over 100 million years old, with a diameter of about 5 km.

== See also ==
- Cawse mine
