= The Great Gold Swindle =

- DVD cover
- Genre: Crime; Drama
- Based on: Perth Mint Swindle
- Written by: David White
- Directed by: John Power
- Starring: John Hargreaves; Tony Rickards; Robert Hughes; Chris Haywood
- Music by: John Stuart
- Country of origin: Australia
- Original language: English

Production
- Executive producer: Michael Thornhill
- Producer: Barbara Gibbs
- Cinematography: David Sanderson
- Editor: Sara Bennett
- Running time: 96 mins
- Production company: Indian Pacific Films
- Budget: $750,000

Original release
- Release: 1984

The Great Gold Swindle is a 1984 Australian TV movie based on the Perth Mint Swindle. It was shot on location in Perth. As far as is known, the gold bullion was never recovered - which would have increased in value to well over $1 million by 1987. During the four-week trial the Mickelberg brothers were cross-examined in the witness box for days on end.

== Premise ==
The film is a fictional recreation of a crime which resulted in the defrauding of the Perth Mint of gold bullion then worth $650,000 in June 1982. The film depicts the brothers Mickelberg as culprits in the theft of 49 gold bars from the mint in Perth, Western Australia and their subsequent arrest and questioning.

== Plot ==
The Mickelberg brothers, two abalone divers (one of them an ex- SAS commando) and a helicopter pilot enter into a conspiracy to induce the Mint to hand over three lots of bullion in return for falsified building society cheques.

Throughout the planning and execution of the swindle, the men behind it remain almost entirely hidden. Largely operating by telephone and letter, they use a series of dupes and temporary employees to carry out their operation.

Their detection comes about through flaws in their operation: proffering building society cheques with near-sequential serial numbers on different dates, the use of a false name already known to police, coupled with fingerprints left on the false cheques.

== Cast ==
- John Hargreaves as Ray Mickelberg
- Tony Rickards as Peter Mickelberg
- Robert Hughes as Brian Mickelberg
- Steve Jodrell as Chris Hunt
- Margaret Ford as Peggy Mickelberg
- Will Day as Malcolm Mickelberg
- Rosemary Harrison as Sheryl Mickelberg
- Elaine Baillie as Faye Mickelberg

also

- Colin McEwan as Ray Allen
- Chris Haywood as Peter Duvnjak
- Bryan Marshall as Det. Sgt Hancock
- Caroline McKenzie as Det. Cvijic
- Robert Faggetter as Det. Sgt Hooft

== Review ==
The Australian Film and Television Companion called The Great Gold Swindle a "well made reconstruction ... A strong cast make it believable."

== Home media ==
A DVD transfer of the film was released in Australia by Flashback Entertainment (cat. 10537).

== See also ==
- The Great Mint Swindle, a 2012 telemovie about the mint swindle
