= Avon Lovell =

Australian journalist and author

Avon Lovell is a Western Australian investigative journalist and writer who wrote books about the Perth Mint Swindle, including The Mickelberg Stitch.

He was born in 1945 and is a graduate in history from the University of Tasmania.

His works were at times difficult to access due to his battles with authority.

His work Litany of lies culminates in the full array of stories collected from the aftermath of the Mickleberg Stitch era. His long term concern about the careers of Don Hancock and Anthony Lewandowski also was developed further.

His work is also corroborated by other writers.

== Works ==
- Lovell, Avon; Bruce Rock Shire Council (W.A.) (1993), Bruce Rock: a revised history, Bruce Rock Shire Council, ISBN 978-0-646-05844-3
- Lovell, Avon (2002), The Mickelberg stitch (2nd. ed.), Creative Research, ISBN 978-0-908469-25-3
- Lovell, Avon (1990), Split image : international mystery of the Mickelberg affair, Creative Research, ISBN 978-0-908469-24-6
