= Murder of Jaidyn Leskie =

1997 child murder in Victoria, Australia

- Image of Leskie, supplied by his family
- Date: 15 June 1997 (aged 1)
- Duration: Missing for six months
- Venue: Found at Blue Rock Dam (deceased) on 1 January 1998
- Location: near Moe, Victoria, Australia; 38°4′46.75″S 146°13′39.11″E
- Type: Murder
- Cause: Head injuries
- Deaths: 1, Leskie
- Inquest: 2006; inconclusive findings
- Coroner: Graeme Johnstone
- Accused: Greg Domaszewicz
- Charges: Murder and manslaughter
- Trial: 4 December 1998
- Verdict: Acquitted
- Parents: Brett Leskie (father); Bilynda Williams (mother)

The murder of Jaidyn Leskie occurred in 1997, believed to have been caused by head injuries. Leskie's body was found at the Blue Rock Dam, near Moe, Victoria, Australia, on 1 January 1998, six months after his disappearance from a Newborough home. A child of Bilynda Murphy (now Williams) and Brett Leskie, Leskie's murder remains unsolved, despite intense public interest, several leads, and the arrest and 1998 trial of a prime suspect, Greg Domaszewicz (/doʊməˈsɛvɪtʃ/), Murphy's boyfriend, who was acquitted of murder, following a trial by jury.

A decision was made in 2002 not to hold an inquest into the toddler's death and the case remained in the news for several more years. An inquest was later held in 2006, implicating Domaszewicz, who at the time of the kidnapping was babysitting the child. The exact circumstances of Leskie's disappearance and death were never clear, and were complicated by vandalism at the house on the evening of the toddler's disappearance; several false tips and pranks about the child's fate; and the body not being discovered until six months after his disappearance.

== Disappearance ==
At the time of his disappearance, Jaidyn Raymond Leskie (30 April 1996 – 15 June 1997) was aged 13 months and two weeks old and lived in the town of Moe with his mother Bilynda Murphy and his older sister. Leskie's father, Brett, was separated from Murphy and was residing in another state at the time of his son's disappearance.

=== Investigation ===
On the night of his disappearance, Leskie was in the care of Greg Domaszewicz, while Murphy went out with her sister. Domaszewicz had been minding Leskie during the day, at his Newborough home, and was originally meant to drop the child home to his regular babysitter at 4pm; however, Domaszewicz never arrived and, despite several attempts, Murphy was unable to get into contact with him. Murphy assumed that Domaszewicz would care for the child throughout the evening and decided to keep her plans with her sister.

Around 2:30am, Domaszewicz left Newborough to pick up an intoxicated Murphy from Ryan's Hotel in the neighbouring town of Traralgon (approximately 20-minutes drive each way). After returning to Moe at around 3am, Domaszewicz dropped Murphy at her home, later returning at approximately 5am to inform her of Leskie's disappearance and taking her to Moe Police Station to file a police report. Domaszewicz claimed that Leskie was abducted from his home after he left for Traralgon, stating that he left the child on the couch to avoid waking him. However, police alleged that Leskie had likely died several hours earlier and while in Domaszewicz's care.

Soon after Leskie was reported missing, local and state police launched an intensive, 20-day missing person's search. The search for Leskie was believed to have been the largest search since the disappearance of Prime Minister Harold Holt in 1967, leading national headlines to proclaim "Where is Jaidyn?". The search was unsuccessful, largely hampered by a lack of witnesses, false tips to police, and the extensive geographic area that needed to be searched.

=== Behaviour of Domaszewicz ===
Domaszewicz's allegedly strange behaviour the night of Leskie's disappearance, during the trial and afterwards, was the focus of media and investigators. Domaszewicz claimed that he left Leskie home alone when picking up Murphy from Traralgon, and that Leskie was abducted before he returned. However, earlier that evening Domaszewicz had called Ryan's Hotel and told Murphy that Leskie had been taken to hospital for a minor burn. After picking her up, Domaszewicz further told Murphy that he had moved Leskie from Moe Hospital due to their substandard care, and that her son was now at Maryvale Hospital—near the town of Morwell. Maryvale Hospital was under construction at that time, and there was no possibility it would receive patients. Domaszewicz then refused Murphy's requests to be taken to Leskie, telling her she was too drunk and would be refused entry. As such, Murphy did not know her child was missing until several hours after she had returned home for the night, believing him to be in hospital. Later defending his claims of Leskie's hospitalisation as an ill-timed joke, Domaszewicz's comments regarding the child's whereabouts were viewed by police as an attempt to cover-up Leskie's death.

Little is known regarding Domaszewicz's movements between arriving home from Traralgon (around 3am) and reporting Leskie missing (around 5am)—he claims that he was searching for Leskie by himself around Moe, stating he believed the child had been kidnapped as a prank. Around 4am, Domaszewicz was pulled over by police and subject to a random breath test. Although he knew Leskie was missing at this time, Domaszewicz did not use this opportunity to inform police.

==== House vandalism ====
From the outset, Leskie's disappearance proved a difficult investigation with no forthcoming witnesses and limited information. Further complicating the investigation was the state of the crime scene—while Domaszewicz was picking up Murphy, his home was vandalised: a severed pig's head was left on the front lawn and several windows were smashed. Police quickly ruled out any relationship between Leskie's disappearance, the vandalism and its perpetrators. Dubbed 'the pig's head team' by Domaszewicz's defence lawyer, Colin Lovett QC, police determined the vandalism was an unrelated act of revenge against Domaszewicz. Police quickly uncovered that this event was orchestrated by the brother of Domaszewicz's ex-girlfriend, Yvonne Penfold, allegedly in retaliation for Domaszewicz's violent treatment of Penfold. The 'Pig's Head Team' became potential witnesses for Leskie's whereabouts after 2:30am, and stated in police and media interviews that they did not hear any sounds of a child crying during their vandalism of Domaszewicz's home. The presence of the severed pig's head at the site of a child's disappearance also fuelled early, yet baseless, public speculation about satanic cults and continued to be referenced in media coverage as symbolic for the confusing and strange circumstances around Leskie's disappearance.

Regardless of quickly being ruled out as suspects, the Pig's Head Team attracted intense attention from media and true crime writers, with some alleging the police should have investigated more thoroughly. There were claims that the Pig's Head Team accidentally injured Leskie during their assault on the home, then kidnapped him to cover up their involvement and caused his death. Domaszewicz claimed that Penfold and the Pig's Head Team kidnapped Leskie as revenge for their failed relationship, panicked after the police became involved, and killed the child. However, there was no verifiable evidence to support such kidnapping theories, and several of these commentators have misrepresented forensic evidence or only offer unnamed witnesses to support their claims. Police maintained that Domaszewicz's home was merely vandalised with no evidence of break and enter, though they received criticism for not fingerprinting the home's interior. Claims of possible intruders were repeatedly refuted by the crime scene examiners, who testified that the glass on the windows was clearly undisturbed and the broken section was too small for an intruder to gain access.

== Discovery ==
On 1 January 1998, more than six months after he disappeared, Leskie's body was discovered by picnickers at the Blue Rock Dam, 18 kilometres (11 mi) north of Moe. Leskie's body was floating on the surface of the reservoir. Approximately 200 metres (660 ft) from where the child's body was discovered, police recovered a two-metre (six-point-six-foot) crowbar, baby's boots, a bottle, a bib, and a sleeping bag. Police alleged that Leskie's body had been wrapped in the sleeping bag and weighed down by the crowbar. Forensic testing on Leskie's body, that was preserved by the cold waters of the lake through winter, revealed a poorly bandaged broken arm, severe head trauma and the presence of the drug Benzhexol. The child's clothing was DNA tested in an effort to solve the crime; however, cross-contamination at the laboratory caused confusion in the case, leading the Leskie case to becoming an internationally discussed example of the fallibility of DNA testing in criminological research. Several claims were made that Leskie's body exhibited signs of being older than when he disappeared, fuelling speculation that he was abducted and kept alive for several months after his kidnapping. However, each of these claims was either refuted via scientific and medical evidence, or was based on unsubstantiated claims made by anonymous witnesses. (Note: There was a suggestion from a diagnostic radiographer that Leskie's broken arm showed minute signs of healing, which would require him to have been alive after his disappearance. However, decomposition can cause changes which appear very similar to minute healing and further examination found no evidence to support the initial claims.) Leskie's teeth, hair and size were also claimed to be slightly more developed than normal for his age at the time of his disappearance. However, each of these observations was explained by normal aspects of the decomposition process. Much of this speculation originated during interviews with Domaszewicz's mother, in defence of her son's innocence.

== Criminal matters ==
=== Arrest of Domaszewicz ===
On 16 July 1997 Domaszewicz was arrested and charged with the murder of Leskie. As Leskie's body was not yet discovered, the case against Domaszewicz was mainly circumstantial. Police alleged that Leskie died sometime during a six-hour period of non-contact, from the time he entered Domaszewicz's house and before Murphy left the hotel. Police alleged that after Domaszewicz killed Leskie, possibly by accident, Domaszewicz walked his body into the dam. This theory was supported by police searches of Domaszewicz's home, which uncovered his wet wallet, as well as wet money hidden under a mattress—police alleged these items to be consistent with being submerged in water. Several tissues stained with Leskie's blood were also discovered in Domaszewicz's household rubbish; however, it was not considered to be a significant amount of blood.

Domaszewicz immediately rejected that he killed Leskie, instead claiming police were engaging in harassment and had falsely accused him of murder, referring to his accusers as 'dogs' in the media. These claims of police harassment were later repeated by Domaszewicz's defence lawyer, alongside allegations of illegal interview recordings, contradictory witness statements, and a lack of tangible evidence presented by police.

=== Trial ===
Domaszewicz was charged with Leskie's murder and was tried for the murder or manslaughter of Leskie in the Supreme Court of Victoria. A jury found Domaszewicz not guilty on 4 December 1998. During the trial, several witnesses testified that he had engaged in prior acts of aggression and violence toward Leskie, such as hitting him across the face, pushing him aggressively, and locking Leskie in dark rooms when he felt annoyed by the child.

== Coronial inquiries ==
In December 1998, following the acquittal of Domaszewicz, the State Coroner, Graeme Johnstone, was petitioned to open an inquest into Leskie's death. After commencing an investigation, in January 2002 the Deputy State Coroner advised that he would not hold an inquest, under his discretionary powers. However, he did release a record of his investigations into Leskie's death. Following further petitions in June 2002, Coroner Johnstone reopened the matter and, on 26 September 2003, set aside the findings by his Deputy, and ordered an inquest, that commenced on 17 November 2023. Domaszewicz's lawyer made an application to the Supreme Court for the inquest to be stayed; and it was partially granted on procedural grounds. A new inquest commenced on 11 July 2005. Domaszewicz was not required to testify and the evidence heard at the earlier inquest was adopted for the fresh inquest. On 31 July 2006, Coroner Johnstone found that Domaszewicz had contributed to the toddler's death and had likely disposed of the child's body. However, Johnstone stopped short of finding Domaszewicz solely responsible for Leskie's death, citing lack of evidence. The Coroner's findings were the closest the case came to a resolution.

=== Aftermath ===
The inability to move forward with what some believe to be new evidence, due to the double jeopardy laws in place in Victoria led Leskie's mother to join a coalition calling for reform of these laws. While changes to double jeopardy laws have driven some pressure to reassess Domaszewicz's involvement in Leskie's death, currently the closest he has come to any admission of guilt is stating to journalists that: 'It's upsetting, still, because ultimately there's a kid that died because of my stupidity.'

Despite media speculation twenty years after Leskie's murder, and debunked hints of 'missing evidence' by a former Victorian police sergeant, there were no new suspects and no plans for a new trial.

One key recommendation from the 2006 coronial inquest was to increase education for parents on how to choose a responsible babysitter. Almost ten years after Leskie's death, the Victorian State Government fulfilled this recommendation by distributing a 'Babysitters Kit', which consisted of a single-page document aiming to provide 'common sense' information and advise parents on choosing 'the right' babysitter. The Babysitter's Kit appeared to be aimed at uneducated parents, with the opening of the document stating that: "Victorian law does not say how old a babysitter must be; you must think about the maturity of the person and if they have the skills to keep your child safe and well—check they have experience in looking after a child of similar age to yours—this is particularly important for babies." In the absence of a convicted perpetrator, continued speculation and irresolution, the Victorian State Government instead addressed the notion of 'poor parenting' as the actionable cause for Leskie's death.

== Media reactions ==
=== At the time of Leskie's disappearance ===
Immediately after Leskie's disappearance was reported to police, nearby reporters learned of his abduction via a police scanner. Media interest in the case began the same morning he disappeared, while Domaszewicz and Murphy were still being questioned by police, with the focus of early coverage on a tale of abduction—characterised by a severed pig's head and rumours of satanic cultism. The disappearance and death of Leskie received national media attention and soon developed into one of the most well-known child murders in recent Australian history, prompting veteran crime journalist Kerry O'Brien to comment that: 'In an awful way, the whole scenario was the perfect media story'. The media placed particular focus on the relationships and personalities of Leskie's family and the town of Moe which, combined with the sensational trial and acquittal of Domaszewicz, caused the case to attain national significance.

The media response was often characterised as having overshadowed Leskie's death, with metropolitan journalists focusing on Moe's 'bizarre' relationships while representing the case as a symptom of rural economic decline, local deviance and 'bad' parenting. In one of the earlier media articles on the case a journalist wrote that, 'It is not only the story of a battered baby, but of where he came from ... from a place of broken families and broken hearts, shattered trust and stunted dreams.' Further coverage continued this characterisation of the case, and was suggested that the town of Moe underwent a trial by media which unfairly demonised Leskie's family and people of Moe as uncivilised, uneducated 'bogans'. Moe's community vocally resisted these negative representations, claiming that the metropolitan media '...had turned Jaidyn Leskie's disappearance into a circus and had been rightly rebuked by residents.' Moe's community also questioned the lack of sympathy or compassion shown by metropolitan media, and struggled to counteract frequent suggestions from the media that Moe was "...a ghetto of the abandoned, of young people without work or prospects."

=== Subsequent reporting ===
The disappearance and death of Leskie featured in several television programs, podcasts and scholarly articles. The case was the focus of episodes of podcasts Unresolved and Australian True Crime Podcast. In 2021, Channel 9 aired Jaidyn Leskie: Little Boy Lost, that featured Domaszewicz's first television interview in twenty years. The documentary also featured a 'round table' discussion on the case with former homicide detective Rowland Legg, who led the police investigation into Leskie's death; Dr. Elise Rosser, who has researched and written on the Leskie case; investigative journalist Keith Moor, a journalist who covered the case; and former NSW Supreme Court judge, The Honourable Anthony Whealy QC.

== See also ==
- List of kidnappings
- Lists of solved missing person cases
- List of unsolved murders (1900–1979)
- List of unsolved murders in Australia
