= Cawse mine =

Nickel mine in Western Australia

- Location in Western Australia
- Interactive map of Cawse mine

Location
- Location: Ora Banda, Western Australia, Australia; 30°22′54″S 121°09′34″E

Production
- Products: Nickel, cobalt

History
- Opened: 1999
- Closed: 2008

Owner
- Company: Wingstar Investments Pty Ltd
- Acquired: 2014

The Cawse mine is a mothballed laterite nickel mine near Ora Banda in Western Australia. Cawse has a remnant Proven Reserve of 3.757 million tonnes of ore grading 0.65% nickel for 24,400 tonnes of nickel, as of 31 December 2009.

The mine, opened in 1999, was Australia's first high pressure acid leaching operation to mine and treat laterite nickel ore to produce nickel metal on site. It was closed in October 2008, due to depressed metal prices.

Cawse was developed by Centaur Mining & Exploration, with an annual capacity of 9,000 tonnes of nickel and up to 2,000 tonnes of cobalt.

In 2001 it was sold to OM Group, and subsequently in 2007 was sold to Norilsk Nickel. In 2014 Norilsk Nickel, having placed the mine and plant on care-and-maintenance in 2008, sold it to Wingstar Investments for an undisclosed amount.
