= Gypsy Joker Motorcycle Club =

- The Australian, Norwegian and Brazilian variant of Gypsy Joker MC logo. Note that the center patch is different for the German and American chapters of the club.
- Founded: April 1, 1956; 70 years ago
- Founding location: San Francisco, California, U.S.
- Years active: 1956–present
- Territory: Australia, Germany, Norway, Brazil and the United States
- Criminal activities: Armed robbery, arson, assault, counterfeiting, drug trafficking, fraud, gunrunning, homicide, identity theft, motorcycle theft and prostitution
- Rivals

The Gypsy Joker Motorcycle Club (GJMC) is an outlaw motorcycle club that was originally formed in San Bernardino, California on April Fool's Day, 1956. Though founded in the United States, the MC expanded successfully overseas and gained significant notoriety in Australia, the United States, Germany and Norway.

According to Arthur Veno is his book, The Brotherhoods: Inside the Outlaw Motorcycle Clubs, it is considered to be one of the most difficult clubs in which to achieve full membership, due to tough requirements and a "prospecting" time that usually takes at least two years.

== Australia ==
In November 1969, Gypsy Joker Motorcycle Club Australia was founded by former members of the St Mary's Motorcycle Club who enjoyed riding Harley Davidson motorcycles. Sydney was the first chapter.

Following a friendly amalgamation with the notorious South Australian formed Mandamas MC and Gypsy Joker MC. The group has had a high profile in Australia, especially in the southern and western regions. The Gypsy Jokers are strong in Western Australia and considered to be one of Australia's most violent bikie gangs.

In June 2001, the Western Australia Police Force seized the home of Leslie "Lee" Hoddy, the national president of the Gypsy Jokers, as the proceeds of crime. An enraged Hoddy shouted at the policemen locking him out of his house "I know where you fuckers all live!", which led him being charged with making death threats. Hoddy who had once been a millionaire died a poor man in 2004 as the Crown had seized his assets, property and bank accounts. They are well known in Australia for the 2001 car bomb murder of Western Australia's former chief detective Don Hancock, known as the Hancock case. The gang had an altercation with Hancock at the hotel he owned in Ora Banda which is 60 km north of Kalgoorlie. After setting up a campsite, Gypsy Joker Billy Grierson was shot dead by a sniper and it was alleged that Hancock was the shooter.

Gypsy Joker members claimed that on January 12, 2001, a member was severely beaten by police in Adelaide, South Australia for refusing to remove his motorcycle helmet and sunglasses.

In February 2008, police forced the Gypsy Jokers to dismantle its clubhouse fortifications, which include a concrete front wall, surveillance cameras and modified doors, in Perth, Western Australia. The club said the security was needed in the area where the burglary rate is high.

Two Gypsy Joker members were jailed on March 5, 2009, on charges of assault. On May 12, 2007, Dean Alan Adams and Peter Floyd Robinson attacked Petera Heta Haimona outside the Cactus Club in Gosnells, Western Australia and beat him with metal pipes.

A Gypsy Joker was charged with unlawful possession of a large sum of cash, weapons and ammunition on August 17, 2007. Police pulled his car over and discovered a gun, an expandable baton, capsicum spray and ammunition when they searched his vehicle.

A Gypsy Joker member was charged with attempted murder on March 17, 2009. He shot and wounded a member of the Newboys gang and former Hells Angel outside their clubhouse in Adelaide, South Australia.

On May 19, 2009, five Gypsy Jokers were involved in a drug-related shoot-out with another gang in Perth, Western Australia. Two were wounded and taken to hospital, one of whom was Club President Leonard Mark Kirby.

== United States ==
In December 1981, Donald Manuel Paradis, a leader of the Gypsy Joker, was convicted of the June 21, 1980 murder of Kimberly Anne Palmer, 19. Palmer and her boyfriend Scott Currier were murdered in Paradis's home. Paradis helped move the bodies to Post Falls, Idaho. Medical pathologist, William Brady, fostered the impression that Palmer had been killed in Idaho. This allowed Idaho to charge and convict Paradis with murder and sentenced to death. Public outcry and legal appeals managed to make it clear that the prosecution had withheld potentially exculpatory evidence, and Paradis' conviction was overturned. When Paradis finally won release from prison in April 2001, David Bond was widely credited with contribution to his case. "Dave Bond believed in me," Paradis noted. "And he got a whole bunch of people to believe in me."

In 2004, the police raided the Gypsy Joker clubhouse in Portland, Oregon looking for two men wanted for armed robbery one of whom went by the street name Brick. (Brick later was found dead due to an altercation with a rival gang and could not be tried for said crimes.) The men were not there, however, and the club sued the Portland Police Bureau for $50,000 because of the damage caused in the raid.

On April 10, 2008, police raided the Gypsy Joker clubhouse in Kennewick, Washington and arrested four men for possession of methamphetamine. Stolen property and weapons were also seized from the premises.

On August 13, 2009, police in Nampa, Idaho, with assistance of the FBI, pulled over and detained approximately 60 to 70 members of the Gypsy Joker just off exit 38 on interstate 84. They were searched, interrogated, and photographed for future reference by law enforcement concerning gang affiliated activity.

As of July 2016, three people in Oregon were facing two counts of murder, one count each of criminal conspiracy to commit murder and two counts each of criminal conspiracy to commit kidnapping regarding the killing of Robert Huggins, once a high-ranking member of the group. Others were accused of hindering prosecution in this case. The investigation led to a raid of the Gypsy Joker clubhouse in North Portland that same year. Huggins' body was found beaten and mutilated in July 2015. His killers shot nails through his boots, carved out an ‘X’ on his body and knocked out his teeth.

On January 31, 2019, six members of the Oregon Gypsy Joker were charged with multiple crimes. The U.S. Attorney's Office said five defendants face charges of murder in aid of racketeering, kidnapping in aid of racketeering resulting in death, kidnapping resulting in death and conspiracy to commit kidnapping resulting in death for the June 30 to July 2, 2015, kidnapping and murder of Huggins. Huggins was a former Gypsy Joker member and resident of southeast Portland. The five defendants are accused of killing Huggins to maintain and increase their positions in the criminal club.

In April 2024, brothers Kyle Ray Campbell and Cameron Earl Campbell, sons of the late President of the Kennewick, WA chapter of the Gypsy Jokers, were sentenced to 25 years and 20 years respectively, in federal penitentiary for possession with intent to distribute fentanyl.

== Norway ==
Gypsy Joker MC Norway started out as a local Harley Davidson club on 1 April 1997. The path towards becoming a new national chapter of the Gypsy Joker MC started in 2007. In 2008 Joker MC members were seen wearing the 1% patch on their colors. For the time being it was still a local 1%-er club, but Gypsy Joker members were frequently observed around the clubhouse. As the suspected plans of a merger became known, other international 1%er clubs opposed the idea of a new international 1%-er club being established. Meanwhile, Joker MC made headlines after a bar brawl in a neighboring city, and after several local business shops put up signs with “Protected by Joker MC”. The police was fearing racketeering and mafia-style conditions in the city, and the club came under heavier surveillance. Several police raids followed in the years to come, without any charges being made. As things started to heat up, the Norwegian Police Security Service put the biker clubs as one of the highest ranking threats for domestic safety as they feared a new biker war brewing. The Joker MC clubhouse was fortified, and members of the club was observed riding with bullet proof vests under their colors.

In November 2011 several Gypsy Jokers came to Norway from abroad, but were all stopped at the airport, where they were incarcerated for days before being shipped back home without being able to enter Norway. At the same time several police officers raided the Joker MC clubhouse. The Norwegian police treatment of the bikers caused several headlines in the US, as several of the members were US Veterans. Just days after a big sign with Gypsy Joker MC decorated the former Joker MC clubhouse. Although the club rarely makes any public comments, a spokesperson did in this case make a statement, clearly meant as a jest on behalf of the police, calling the finalization of the patch-over a Christmas gift for the local police and their constant quest for more money and resources.

All though the club mostly keeps to itself, they continue draw attention from both the public and the police, with the latest known police raid being in 2020 when armed police raided the club on the suspicion of a case involving the violence and bodily harm. Still, no charges were made following the raid. Gypsy Joker MC Norway hold an annual Joker Run every 1 May, gathering over hundred local bikers from different local motorcycle clubs. Gypsy Joker MC Norway have a support club in Brazil, Jesters MC, established in 2017. Gypsy Joker members are frequently seen in Brazil. The pattern is similar to the patch-over of Joker MC and its assumed that the Jesters MC is a foothold for the club to establish a full Gypsy Joker MC chapter with the time.

As of March 2025 a full chapter of Gypsy Joker MC is established in Brazil.

== Brazil ==
Gypsy Joker MC Brazil was officially established 17 March 2025. Jesters MC Brazil still remains as a support club in the area.

== See also ==
- List of outlaw motorcycle clubs
- Criminal Law (Criminal Organisations Disruption) Amendment Act 2013

== Books ==
- Sher, Julian; Marsden, William (2006). Angels of Death: Inside the Bikers' Empire of Crime. Toronto: Alfred Knopf Canada. ISBN 9780307370327.
