= Jacques and His Master =

1971 play written by Milan Kundera

Jacques and His Master is a play written in 1971 by Milan Kundera, with the subtitle "An Homage to Diderot in Three Acts". Kundera's work is a variation on Denis Diderot's late 18th-century novel Jacques the Fatalist. The play was first produced in Zagreb, former Yugoslavia, in 1980. It has also been staged in Greece, West Germany, Switzerland and France. On 16 January 1985 it had its English-language premiere at the American Repertory Theater in Cambridge, Massachusetts under the direction of Susan Sontag in her American debut as a theater director. The text of the play was translated from French into English by Michael Henry Heim. In 1986 the play was again translated by actor Simon Callow and directed by him in 1987.

== Plot ==
The play in three acts (performed without intermission) follows the servant Jacques and his aristocratic Master as they go on a journey (that remains unexplained for the whole play) through a void inhabited only by an innkeeper. The men swap tales of their past romantic misadventures and those scenes are performed for the audience. But Jacques and his Master keep interrupting and amending their stories and are themselves interrupted by the innkeeper, who recounts still another tale of sexual betrayal. The Master tells how his beloved was stolen by his best friend; Jacques tells how he stole a night with his best friend's beloved; an innkeeper tells the tale of a certain Marquise de la Pommeraye, "a widow of good manners and birth, of wealth and dignity", who took elaborate revenge when her beloved started treating her like a friend.

While the first two stories are loosely (the second only very loosely) connected with the outcome of the journey, the third, which takes up the entire second act, is from the technical standpoint purely and simply an episode (unintegrated into the main action). The three stories are intermingled rather than told consecutively and each of the three stories is in fact a variation on the others. The play is set in the eighteenth century, like Diderot's novel Jacques the Fatalist, however Kundera deliberately leaves the historical aspects of time and place as ambiguous.

The play examines the issues of authorship and the nature of artistic creation through the dialogue between the two principal characters and their rendering of their own histories.

== Notable productions ==
- The American Repertory Theatre, Cambridge, Massachusetts, directed by Susan Sontag (1985)
- The New Theater of Brooklyn, New York, directed by Deborah J. Pope (1989)
- Old Fire Station, Oxford, United Kingdom, directed by Luca Giberti, with John Gaughan and Brian Stewart (2003)
- ADC Theatre, Cambridge, United Kingdom, directed by Amrou Al-Kadhi and Francesca Warner (23–26 February 2011)
