= Shane Bourne =

Australian comedian (born 1949)

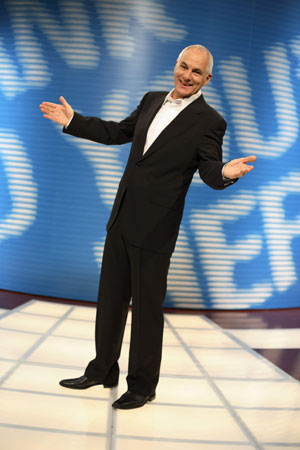
- Bourne in 2009
- Born: Shane Jerome Bourne; 24 November 1949 (age 76); Melbourne, Victoria, Australia
- Occupations: Actor; stand-up comedian; television presenter; musician
- Years active: 1975–present

Shane Jerome Bourne (born 24 November 1949) is an Australian stand-up comedian, actor, musician, and television host.

== Early life and education ==
Shane Jerome Bourne was born on 24 November 1949 in Melbourne, Victoria. He was raised by his mother Moreen "Pixie" (née Freeman, 1915–2000), a former model, with his younger brother Dannie. Their father Stan Bourne, who was a musician and entertainer, left the family home when Bourne was seven.

== Career ==
=== 1970s ===
Bourne co-founded an Australian pop, rock band Bandicoot in early 1976 with Mick Fettes (formerly of the band Madder Lake) both on lead vocals. They had met at John Pinder's Reefer Cabaret concerts, where Bourne often acted as compere and/or performed stand-up comedy. The group's songs were co-written by Bourne and Fettes. Fellow musicians were his brother Dannie Bourne on keyboards or piano (from Pantha), Ross Davis on guitar, Kerry McKenna on guitar (from Madder Lake) and Gary Young on drums (ex-Daddy Cool, Hot Dog).

Bandicoot released a self-titled album in 1976 via Rainbird/Tempo, with a top-100 single "Living off the Radio" issued in March 1976. According to Australian musicologist Ian McFarlane, Bandicoot "mixed good-time rock'n'roll, blues, country and pop but failed to chart." Bandicoot toured for a year with Bourne and Fettes joined by Bruno De Stanislo on bass guitar, Mick Elliot on guitar, Peter Reed on drums and Tony Vikaris on guitar. They disbanded in May 1977.

=== 1980s–1999 ===
Bourne was a well-known comedic face throughout the 1980s and 1990s, with an acting role on the Australian version of the British sitcom, Are You Being Served? (in 1980 and 1981). He had regular appearances on the variety program Hey Hey It's Saturday (1988–1994) in various sketches, but mainly appeared on the Great Aussie Joke segment. He starred in the short-lived sitcom Bingles in 1992 and 1993. In 1996, Bourne hosted a revived Blankety Blanks, which lasted only two seasons.

He also had dramatic roles; he was in 3 episodes of the drama series Prisoner in the early 1980s as 3 different guest roles, and had a guest role in The Flying Doctors in 1995.

=== 2000–present ===
Bourne made a change to dramatic acting and has been critically acclaimed. After a two-episode guest appearance on Blue Heelers in 2000, he took the lead role of lawyer 'Happy' Henderson (starring alongside Kerry Armstrong) in the ABC TV legal-drama series MDA. The show ended after its third season in September 2005. This show won him 2 awards. He also played a minor role in the film Kokoda, an Australia WWII film about the Kokoda Track in which he played as the battalion's doctor.

Bourne hosted the comedy television series Thank God You're Here from 2006 to 2009. When the show was revived in 2023, he was succeeded by Celia Pacquola. In 2006, he hosted How the Hell Did We Get Here?, a series that aired on ABC TV.

Bourne began acting in the Channel Seven drama series, City Homicide on 27 August 2007. He appeared on the show until its axing after season 5, in 2011.

Bourne participated in Who Do You Think You Are? in 2010. The following year, he hosted the 2011 Logie Awards. In 2012, Bourne appeared in the short-lived drama Tricky Business, that aired on Channel Nine. He also starred in the telemovie The Great Mint Swindle. In early 2014, he hosted the AACTA Awards on Channel Ten.

In June 2015, Bourne played the role of Evan Pettyman, a minor character in The Dressmaker. The same year, he also joined the fifteenth season of Dancing with the Stars as the new co-host alongside Edwina Bartholomew, replacing Daniel MacPherson.

== Awards ==
At the AFI Awards in 2003 and 2005, Bourne won the Best Actor in a Television Drama award for his role in MDA, and was nominated for the same award in 2002.

At the 2003 Logies, he was nominated for the Most Outstanding Actor award for his role in MDA.

== Filmography ==
=== Film ===
Year	Title	Role	Notes
2006	Kokoda	The Doctor	Feature film
2012	The Great Mint Swindle	Don Hancock	TV movie
2015	The Dressmaker	Evan Pettyman	Feature film
2016	Comedy Showroom: Bleak	John O'Brien	TV movie
2019	Ride Like a Girl	Trevor Smart	Feature film

=== Television ===
Year	Title	Role	Notes
1980s	Prisoner	3 guest roles	
1980–81	Are You Being Served?	Mr Randel	16 episodes
1985	Trapp, Winkle and Box		
1988-94	Hey Hey It's Saturday	Sketch actor	Great Aussie Joke segment & more
1991	The Flying Doctors	Walter	1 episode
1992–93	Bingles	Barry	23 episodes
1996	Blankety Blanks	Host	2 seasons
1996	Cody: The Burnout	Graham	TV movie
2000	Blue Heelers	Bryce McLeod	2 episodes
2002–05	MDA	Bill 'Happy' Henderson	56 episodes
2006–09	Thank God You're Here	Host	41 episodes
2006–11	City Homicide	Stanley Wolfe	84 episodes
2011	2011 Logie Awards	Host	TV special
2012	Tricky Business	Jim Christie	13 episodes
2014	AACTA Awards	Host	TV special
2015	Dancing with the Stars	Co-host	TV series, season 15
2022	Fisk	Howard	3 episodes

== Discography ==
=== Studio albums ===
List of albums
Title	Album details
The Great Aussie Joke (with Maurie Fields)	Released: 1988; Format: LP; Label: Hammard (HAM 186)
