= Robert Faggetter =

Australian actor

Robert Bruce Faggetter
- Born: 23 February 1945; London
- Died: 6 February 2013
- Occupation: Actor

Robert (Bob) Bruce Faggetter was an Australian actor and a co-founder of the Western Australian branch of Actors' Equity. He had a long theatre career including touring nationally with Footrot Flats - The Musical and appearing in Inner Voices (1977, Nimrod Downstairs) Music From The Whirlwind (1977, Lookout Theatre) Bran Nue Dae (1990–1991, touring)
