= Steve Jodrell =

Australian director

- Occupations: Director, actor
- Years active: 1970s–present
- Notable work: Shame, Wentworth

Steve Jodrell is an Australian director of theatre, film and television. He began his career in the theatre before moving into film.

== As director ==
- The Buck's Party (1978) – short
- Shame (1988)
- Tudawali (1988) – TV movie
- Round the Twist: Big Belly Upset and Fast Forward
- Lift off: Hunting the Not Fair (1992)
- Halifax f.p. – episode 4 (1995) "My Lovely Girl"
- The Circuit (2007) six episodes.
- Churchill and Menzies at War (2008)
- Wentworth (10 episodes, 2014–2016) – TV series

== As actor ==
- The Great Gold Swindle 1984 telemovie
- Lake Mungo (2008)
