= Don Hancock =

Australian policeman

Donald Leslie Hancock (5 January 1937 – 1 September 2001) was a Western Australian policeman. He is principally known for his involvement in the investigation of the Perth Mint Swindle, and his death in a car bombing in 2001.

== Early life ==
Hancock was born in Western Australia, on 5 January 1937, to Leslie John Hancock and Melba May (née Bourke). He worked in the family's gold mine at Grant's Patch near Ora Banda.

== Police ==
Hancock joined the Western Australian Police in 1959. Initially part of the Gold Stealing Detection Squad, he transferred to the Criminal Investigation Branch (CIB) in 1966. He worked in various detective branches before becoming officer-in-charge of the CIB in 1989, and retired on 28 January 1994.

Tony Lewandowski, a police colleague, identified himself and Hancock as both being corruptly responsible for fabricating evidence against the three Mickelberg brothers in the Perth Mint Swindle investigation, prior to Lewandowski's 2004 suicide. In the book Mickelberg Stitch, author Avon Lovell captioned a photograph of him with the name The Grey Fox.

A 2010 coronial investigation into the murder of Shirley Finn listed Don Hancock as a potential suspect.

== Retirement and death ==
Following his retirement from the police, Hancock moved back to Ora Banda to run the historic inn.

Hancock was killed on 1 September 2001 in Lathlain by a bomb placed under his car. Hancock was murdered by Gypsy Joker Sid Reid in revenge for the murder of Billy Grierson, allegedly by Hancock after Grierson "made obscene comments in front of his daughter." A 2003 prosecution of an alleged accomplice was unsuccessful.

At the 2006 inquest into the October 2000 shooting death of Billy Grierson, the coroner stated: "There is a significant body of evidence which suggests Mr Hancock may have been the shooter," but the Gypsy Jokers "could have a large number of enemies." He was unable to determine who Grierson's killer was because Hancock was now dead, police had failed to conduct routine forensic science tests and had failed to search Hancock's home. The relevant senior investigating officer was Kim Gage, head of Kalgoorlie detectives, who had reportedly spent the day drinking with Hancock and others. Reid was convicted of the murder and sentenced to life in jail which was reduced to 15 years for helping police in the failed second prosecution.
