= Jovan Radomir =

Swedish television presenter (born 1963)

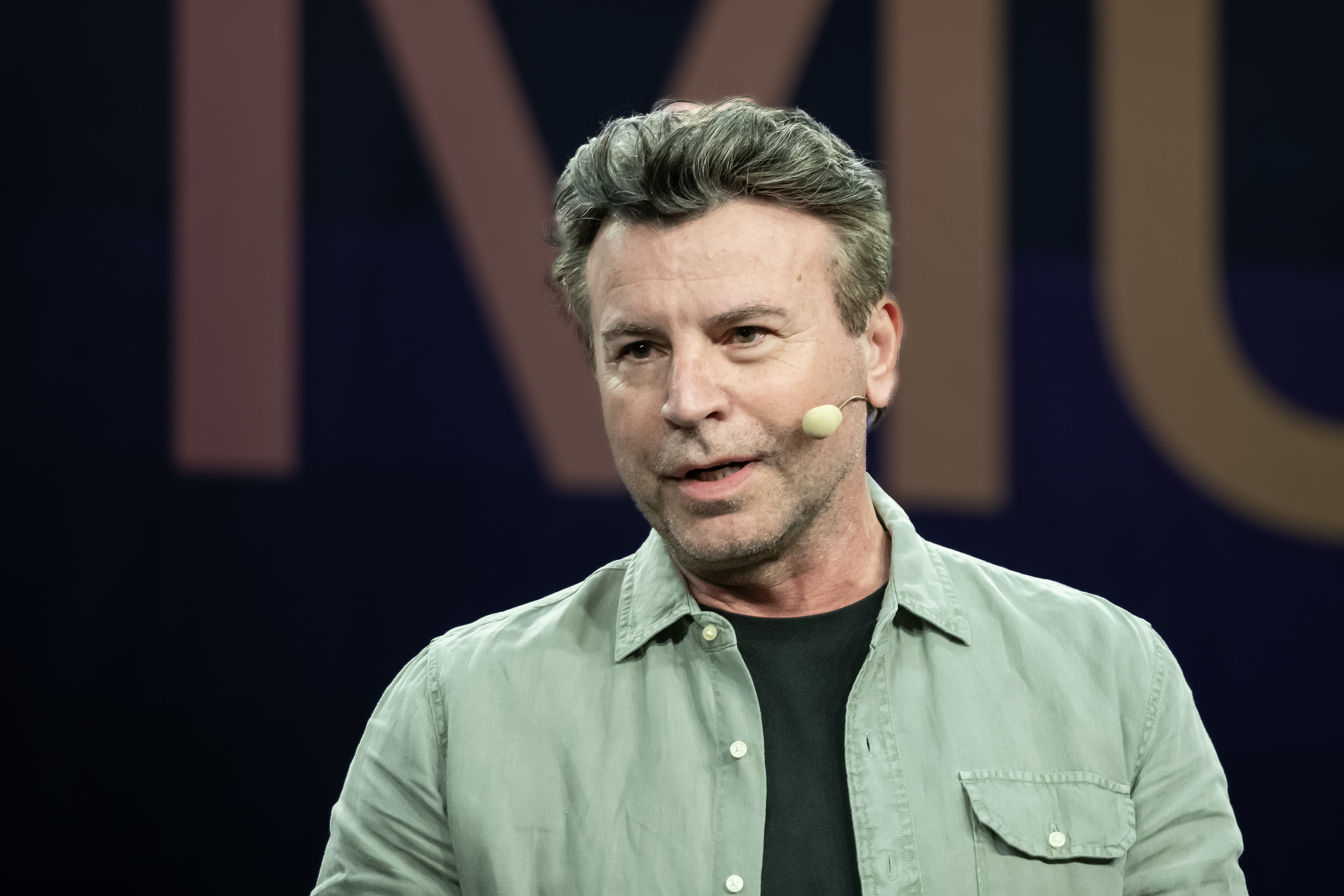
- Radomir in 2024
- Born: 8 September 1963 (age 62); Srbac, SR Bosnia and Herzegovina, SFR Yugoslavia
- Citizenship: Serbia; Sweden
- Occupation: Television presenter

Jovan Radomir (born 8 September 1963) is a Serbian-Swedish television presenter, best known for presenting music programmes for Sveriges Television (SVT). His family's origin is Bosnian Serb.

He has also worked as an actor, author and lyricist.

== Early life ==
Radomir was born in Srbac, SR Bosnia and Herzegovina, SFR Yugoslavia to an ethnic Serbian family and moved to Sweden as a child at the age of two, spending his childhood in Katrineholm before moving to Stockholm in the 1990s.

== Television career ==
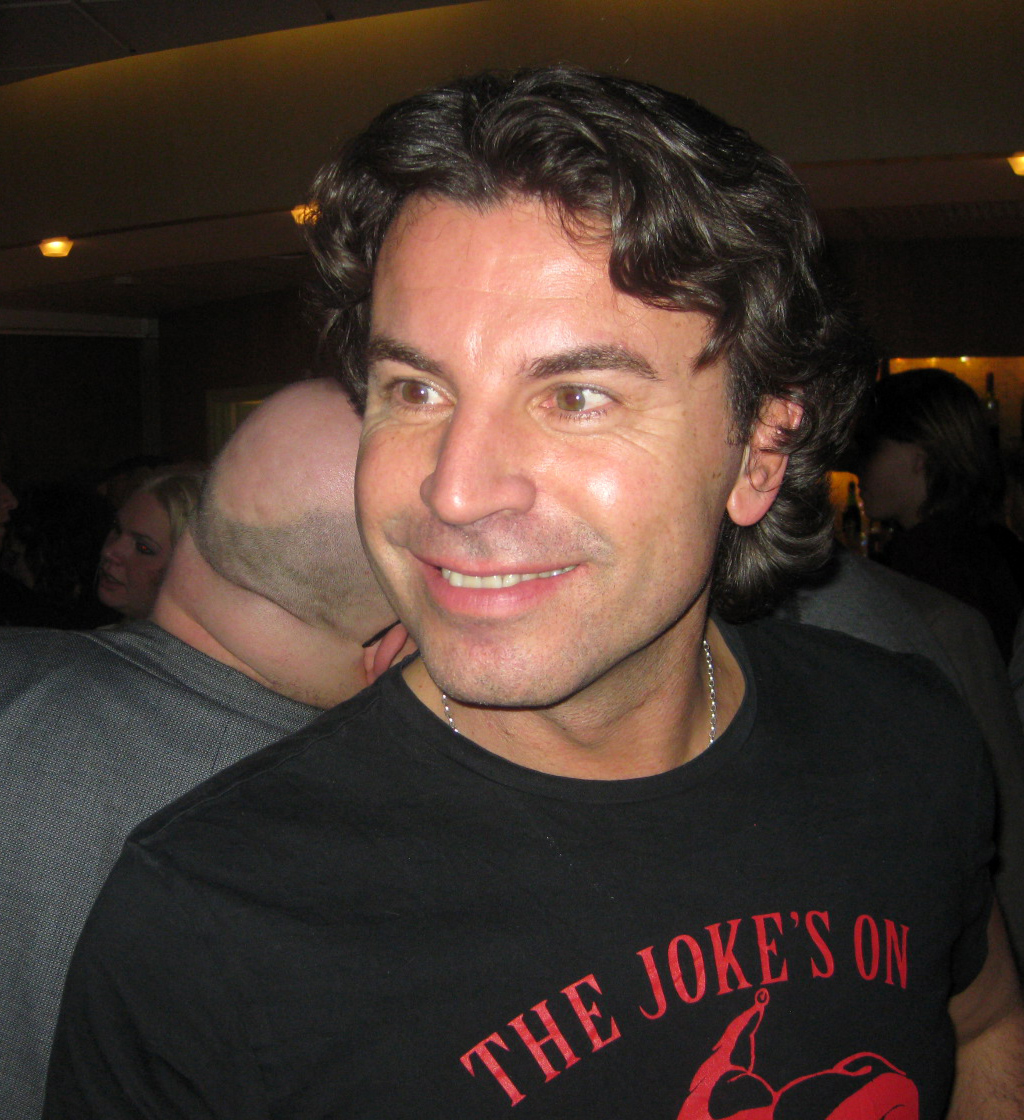
Radomir at Melodifestivalen 2009.

Since joining SVT, Radomir has mainly presented music programmes such as Voxpop, Folktoppen, Megadrom, One Night with Elvis, Hårdrocknatten, and 80 tals natten. As an interviewer at Voxpop he got to interview the members of U2 as the only Swedish media during that stint in Sweden. He also during the same time presented the music show Musikbyrån at SVT. He has as well presented Folktoppen, a chart show in 2005 at SVT along with Shirley Clamp and David Bexelius.

In 2005, he along with Sveriges Radio presenter Håkan Persson presented a simultaneous broadcast between SVT and Sveriges Radio of Iron Maiden's concert at Ullevi. In 2007 he was part of a sports-panel at Sveriges Radios sport show Sportsnack.

He has also chaired interviews with artists such as Eminem, Iron Maiden, Metallica, Celine Dion, Destinys Child, Motörhead and U2, and reported on the work of Swedish charity Världens Barn in Africa and South America.

He has also presented SVT24's coverage of the Basketligan play-offs. He was one of the presenters for the Swedish broadcast of the Live Earth gala in 2007.

Radomir has produced the documentary series Svenskarna i Guca (Swedes in Guca) for SVT, a documentary about the Roman band Süperstar Orkestar in southern Serbia.

In 2016, Jovan produced a documentary about the irish rock legends - Thin Lizzy. In 2018, Jovan produced a three part roadmovie with his friend, the Swedish actor Olle Sarri - A story about Olles roots in northern part of Sweden, När Olle mötte Sarri (In Swedish: "When Olle met Sarri"). In 2019, Jovan and Beppe Strabrink produced six TV travel stories for SVT TV-show Go´Kväll which was filmed on location in Serbia and Bosnia & Hercegovina.

=== Eurovision Song Contest ===
Radomir was the Swedish spokesperson at the Eurovision Song Contest in 2004 and 2006, announcing the results of the national televoting. When he presented the votes in 2004, he gave the points for Serbia and Montenegro in Serbian, while in 2006 he gave the points for Bosnia and Herzegovina in Serbian.

In 2005, Radomir wrote the lyrics to the song "You're Gonna Get What You Deserve" performed by singer Nikita in the Bosnian national final for the Eurovision Song Contest 2005.

In 2008 and 2009, Radomir and Nina Radulovic presented the online show Eurovision Countdown which aired in 43 countries that participated in the Eurovision Song Contest. The show had approximately 200 million viewers.

Radomir also wrote the lyrics to "Destiny", the English translation of "Molitva" (Молитва), which would go on to win the 2007 contest. He has also released a self-titled remix of the song.

Ahead of the 2015 contest, he helped Swedish artist Måns Zelmerlöw to appear on X Factor Adria a few days before the final.

Radomir was announced on 21 January 2016 as host of the semi-final allocation draw for the 2016 contest, alongside Alexandra Pascalidou. The draw was held on 25 January in Stockholm City Hall and broadcast live on SVT Play and the contest's official YouTube channel.

Alongside Catarina Rolfsdotter-Jansson, he gave commentary on the red carpet event held on 8 May in front of Stockholm Palace preceding the opening ceremony in Stockholm City Hall. Radomir also hosted the press conferences for the contest.

In 2020 and 2022, Jovan presented Beovizija, the Serbian national final that selects an artist for the Eurovision Song Contest, alongside Dragana Kosjerina, Kristina Radenković, and Stefan Popović.

In 2024, he was included in the Encyclopedia of the National Diaspora, edited by chronicler Ivan Kalauzović Ivanus.

== Filmography ==
Radomir played a border control officer in the 2002 movie Hundtricket – The Movie, (Swedish: The Dog Trick) which also starred Alexander Skarsgård and Josephine Bornebusch.

He also starred as a television presenter in an episode of the 2003 SVT drama Belinder auktioner (Swedish: Belinder Auctions).

== Bibliography ==
In 2011, Radomir published Mitt Balkan: mat och människor (Swedish: My Balkans: food and people), a collection of some of his favourite Serbian dishes. In 2015, an English version of his first cookbook "Balkan - Food and people" was released.

In 2019, Jovan Radomir published his second cookbook: "Balkan - mat, människor och minnen" ( Balkan - food, people and memories") A collection of his favourite Balkan dishes.

== Literature ==
- Kalauzović, I. (2025). Encyclopedia of the National Diaspora. Niš, Serbia: Impressions Publishing. ISBN 978-86-82470-02-1.
