= Emma Jackson =

Emma Jackson may refer to:

== Arts and media ==
- Emma Jackson (director), Australian director, co-director of the 2026 TV series Dalliance
- Emma Jackson (Home and Away), a fictional character played by Dannii Minogue

== Sport ==
- Emma Jackson (triathlete) (born 1991), triathlete from Australia
- Emma Jackson (runner) (born 1988), 800m runner from England
