= Love Me (TV series) =

Australian drama television series

- Genre: Drama
- Written by: Alison Bell; Leon Ford; Adele Vuko; Brendan Phillips; Blake Ayshford
- Directed by: Emma Freeman
- Starring: Bojana Novakovic; Hugo Weaving; Will Lodder; Bob Morley; Heather Mitchell; Sarah Peirse; Mitzi Ruhlmann; Shalom Brune-Franklin; Celia Pacquola
- Country of origin: Australia
- Original language: English
- No. of seasons: 2
- No. of episodes: 12

Production
- Executive producers: Michael Brooks; Hamish Lewis; Brian Walsh; Alison Hurbert-Burns; Lana Greenhalgh
- Producers: Nicole O'Donohue; Polly Staniford; Angie Fielder
- Running time: 45 Minutes
- Production companies: Warner Bros. International Television Australia; Aquarius Films

Original release
- Network: BINGE; Foxtel
- Release: 26 December 2021 – present

Related
- Love Me (Swedish); Love Me (South Korean)

Love Me is an Australian drama series and the first original production of streaming service Binge, that premiered on 26 December 2021. Set in Melbourne, Love Me is a story about love, loss, and relationship complexity for the father, daughter, and son of a contemporary, middle-class Australian family. The season one, six-part series is directed by Emma Freeman with lead writer Alison Bell, and writers Leon Ford, Adele Vuko, and Blake Ayshford. Season two premiered on 6 April 2023.

The ensemble cast includes Hugo Weaving, Bojana Novakovic, William Lodder, and Sarah Peirse, along with Bob Morley, Heather Mitchell, Celia Pacquola, Mitzi Ruhlmann, and Shalom Brune-Franklin.

Love Me is produced by Angie Fielder and Polly Staniford of Aquarius Films and executive produced by Michael Brooks and Hamish Lewis (Warner Bros.). Executive producers for the Foxtel Group are Brian Walsh, Alison Hurbert-Burns, and Lana Greenhalgh.

== Premise ==
Love Me is a story about relationship complexity for the father, daughter, and son of the Mathieson family, who are middle-class Australians living in Melbourne. Triggered by the death of the disabled mother, cared for by the father at home for some years, the three stumble in their lives. The premise is that finding each other in such a situation is a slow process.

In series 1, Clara, a doctor, Aaron, a 20-something law student, and their father Glenn are introduced, each with romantic entanglements. Melbourne scenes and occasionally Sorrento figure strongly in the series.

Series 2 picks up nine months later with new challenges in their romantic relationships. Clara and partner Peter are trying to have a baby. Aaron is now a father to a baby with ex-girlfriend Ella. Glenn's new partner is Anita (Heather Mitchell).

== Cast ==
=== Main / regular ===
- Bojana Novakovic as Clara Mathieson
- Hugo Weaving as Glen Mathieson
- William Lodder as Aaron Mathieson
- Bob Morley as Peter K
- Heather Mitchell as Anita
- Sarah Peirse as Christine Mathieson
- Mitzi Ruhlmann as Jesse
- Shalom Brune-Franklin as Ella
- Celia Pacquola as Sacha
- John Augustine Sharp as Max

=== Guests ===
- Georgina Naidu as Sonia (2 episodes)
- Kym Gyngell as Richard (4 episodes)
- Louise Siversen as Judith (2 episodes)
- Phoenix Raei as Johan (2 episodes)

== Episodes ==
=== Series overview ===
Series	Episodes	Originally released
1	6	26 December 2021
2	6	6 April 2023

=== Season 1 (2021) ===
No. overall	No. in season	Title	Directed by	Written by	Original release date
1	1	"Episode 1"	Emma Freeman	Alison Bell	26 December 2021
Three members of the one family have confronting, joyous and heart-warming experiences of love as they deal with the complexity of their personal relationships.
2	2	"Episode 2"	Emma Freeman	Leon Ford	26 December 2021
It's Christine's funeral. Glen, Clara and Aaron have very different emotional responses to their grief which propels them each on a new path.
3	3	"Episode 3"	Emma Freeman	Blake Ayshford	26 December 2021
Glen's holiday is turning in to something unexpectedly enjoyable, Clara goes on a date with Peter and Aaron can't believe everyone is moving on from his mother's death so soon.
4	4	"Episode 4"	Emma Freeman	Adele Vuko	26 December 2021
As life and love starts to flourish for Glen, Clara and Aaron, they're each momentarily jolted back a step to reconsider their choices.
5	5	"Episode 5"	Emma Freeman	Alison Bell	26 December 2021
After scattering the ashes of their Mum, Clara and Aaron meet their Dad's new love and their own relationships take yet another turn.
6	6	"Episode 6"	Emma Freeman	Leon Ford	26 December 2021
Glen and Anita prepare for the wedding, while Aaron receives some news that threatens his new relationship with Jesse, and Clara tries to work things out with Peter.

=== Season 2 (2023) ===
No. overall	No. in season	Title	Directed by	Written by	Original release date
7	1	"Episode 1"	Bonnie Moir	Leon Ford	6 April 2023
Aaron is about to become a father while Glen is enjoying life with his new wife Anita. Inspired by that, Clara and Peter decide to embark on their own journey to becoming parents.
8	2	"Episode 2"	Bonnie Moir	Tamara Asmar	6 April 2023
Anita's mysterious phone calls cause Glen's suspicions. In the meantime, Peter and Clara invite Peter's ex for dinner which causes a heated confrontation, after which Peter demands a paternity test.
9	3	"Episode 3"	Bonnie Moir	Celia Pacquola	6 April 2023
Glen is faced with a mysterious man in Anita's life. In the meantime, Peter and Clara face challenges having to navigate and the pressure of making a baby.
10	4	"Episode 4"	Bonnie Moir	Adele Vuko	6 April 2023
Under enormous pressure the relationships of Glen, Clara, and Aaron collapse, and they each feel isolated and alone.
11	5	"Episode 5"	Bonnie Moir	Leon Ford	6 April 2023
Clara's and Peter's relationship is strained after a turbulent experience, but a rescue mission in Sorrento get Glen and Peter together and makes them reflect on their actions and their relationships.
12	6	"Episode 6"	Bonnie Moir	Tamara Asmar	6 April 2023
While the Mathieson family is preparing to sell off the family home, positive changes are happening in each of their relationships.

== Production ==
Love Me is based on the acclaimed Swedish series, Älska mig created by Josephine Bornebusch.

Love Me is a Warner Bros. International Television Production Australia production in association with Aquarius Films for the Foxtel Group. Major production investment from Screen Australia and financed with support from Film Victoria through production investment and the Regional Location Assistance Fund. The series is produced by Angie Fielder and Polly Staniford (Aquarius Films) and executive produced by Michael Brooks and Hamish Lewis (Warner Bros.) Brian Walsh, Alison Hurbert-Burnside, and Lana Greenhalgh (Foxtel).

Set in Melbourne, Victoria, season one was shot during 2021. The season one, six-part series is directed by Emma Freeman with lead writer Alison Bell, and writers Leon Ford, Adele Vuko, and Blake Ayshford.

== Broadcast ==
The first season premiered on Binge on 26 December 2021.

On the eve of the Australian TV Week 2022 Logie Awards, where Love Me received seven nominations, Binge announced a second season. Season two premiered on 6 April 2023.

== Awards ==
Year	Award	Category	Recipient(s)	Result	Ref.
2022	Casting Guild of Australia Awards	Best Casting in a TV Miniseries or Telemovie	Nathan Lloyd	Nominated	
2022	AACTA Awards	Best Drama Series	Hamish Lewis, Michael Brooks, Angie Fielder and Polly Staniford; Warner Bros. International Television Production Australia / Binge, Foxtel	Nominated	
2022	AACTA Awards	Best Casting	Nathan Lloyd	Nominated	
2022	AACTA Awards	Best Direction in Drama or Comedy	Emma Freeman	Nominated	
2022	AACTA Awards	Best Screenplay in Television	Adele Vuko	Nominated	
2022	AACTA Awards	Best Production Design in Television	Josephine Ford	Nominated	
2022	AACTA Awards	Best Costume Design in Television	Cappi Ireland	Nominated	
2022	AACTA Awards	Best Cinematography in Television	Earle Dresner	Nominated	
2022	AACTA Awards	Best Lead Actor in a Drama	Hugo Weaving	Nominated	
2022	AACTA Awards	Best Lead Actress in a Drama	Bojana Novakovic	Nominated	
2022	AACTA Awards	Best Supporting Actress in a Drama	Heather Mitchell	Nominated	
2022	Logie Awards	Most Popular Drama	Warner Bros. International Television Production Australia / Binge, Foxtel	Nominated	
2022	Logie Awards	TV Week Silver Logie - Most Outstanding Drama Series	Warner Bros. International Television Production Australia / Binge, Foxtel	Nominated	
2022	Logie Awards	Most Popular Actor	Hugo Weaving	Nominated	
2022	Logie Awards	Most Popular Actress	Bojana Novakovic	Nominated	
2022	Logie Awards	TV Week Silver Logie - Most Outstanding Actor	Hugo Weaving	Nominated	
2022	Logie Awards	TV Week Silver Logie - Most Outstanding Supporting Actress	Heather Mitchell	Won	
2022	Logie Awards	Graham Kennedy Award for Most Popular New Talent	William Lodder	Nominated	
2024	AACTA Awards	Best Drama Series	Nicole O'Donohue, Hamish Lewis, Michael Brooks; Warner Bros. International Television Production Australia / Binge	Nominated	
2024	AACTA Awards	Best Lead Actor in a Drama	Hugo Weaving	Won	
2024	AACTA Awards	Best Lead Actress in a Drama	Bojana Novakovic	Nominated	
2024	AACTA Awards	Best Supporting Actress in a Drama	Heather Mitchell	Won	
2024	AACTA Awards	Best Supporting Actor in a Drama	Bob Morley	Nominated	
2024	Logie Awards	Best Drama Program	Binge	Nominated	
2024	Logie Awards	TV Week Silver Logie – Best Lead Actor in a Drama	Hugo Weaving	Nominated	
