= Land of Hope (miniseries) =

- Written by: Tony Morphett; John Patterson; Anne Brooksbank
- Directed by: Chris Adshead; Gary Conway
- Starring: Maureen Green; Patricia Kennedy
- Country of origin: Australia
- Original language: English
- No. of episodes: 10 x 1 hour

Production
- Producer: Suzanne Baker
- Budget: $4.6 million

Original release
- Network: Seven Network
- Release: 18 May – 28 July 1986

Land of Hope is a 1986 Australian mini series that tells the story of the Australian Labor Party through the eyes of the fictional Quinn family over four generations. It was produced by the Seven Network.

== Cast ==
- Maureen Green as Young Maureen Quinn
- Patricia Kennedy as Old Maureen Quinn
- Patrick Dickson as Paddy Quinn
- Benjamin Franklin as Kevin Quinn
- Penelope Stewart as Young Nesta Quinn
- Melissa Jaffer as Old Nesta Quinn
- Drew Forsythe as Old Frank Quinn
- Melita Jurisic as Kathleen Quinn
- Peter Kowitz as Leo Quinn
- Richard Moir as Dominic Quinn
- Mark Owen-Taylor as Andrew Quinn
- Helen Buday as Sarah Quinn
- Heather Mitchell as Helen Davies
- Christopher Dibb as Tom Mann
- Victoria Longley
