= Heather Mitchell =

Australian actress

Heather Mitchell AM
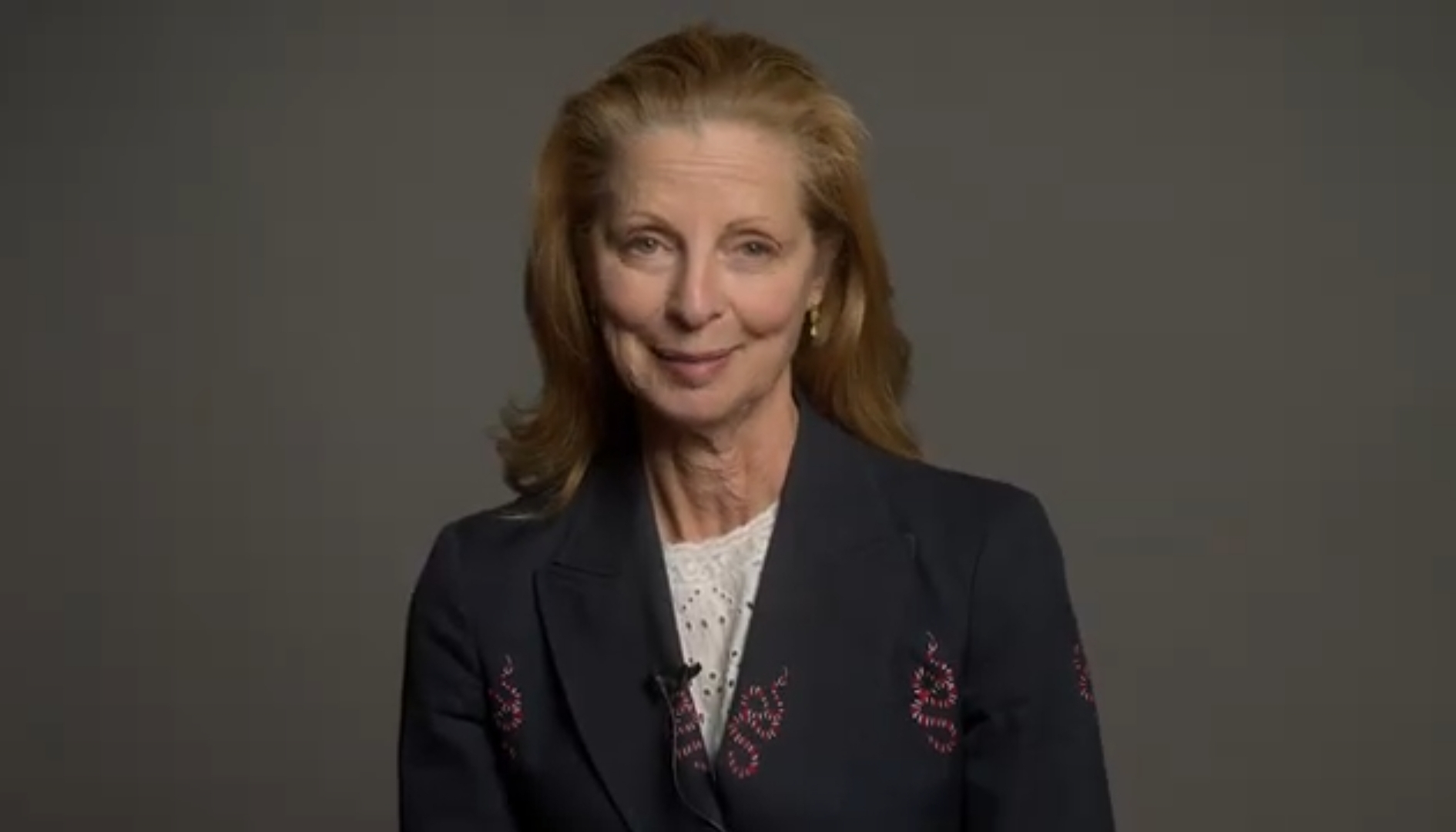
- Heather Mitchell, 2023
- Education: National Institute of Dramatic Art (BFA)
- Occupation: Actress
- Years active: 1981–present
- Website: heathermitchell.com.au

Heather Lee Mitchell is an Australian actress, who has appeared in Australian stage, television, and film productions. She is best known for her leading role in the 1990s television show Spellbinder. More recently, she appeared as Anita in the series Love Me, and as Margaux in the Paramount Plus series Fake. She has a role in the miniseries The Narrow Road to the Deep North.

Mitchell is a graduate of the National Institute of Dramatic Art, and has performed on stage since 1975, including collaborations with dance company Force Majeure. Since 2022, she has played U.S. justice Ruth Bader Ginsburg in the play RBG: Of Many, One, for Sydney Theatre Company.

== Early life and education ==
Heather Lee Mitchell attended Camden High School in Camden, New South Wales, between 1971 and 1976, and was school captain in her final year. She took the leading role of Judith Bliss in the 1976 school production of Noël Coward's Hay Fever. She is ethnically Jewish.

== Career ==
=== Television ===
Mitchell is well known internationally for her performance as Ashka in the Australian/Polish co-productions of Spellbinder (1995), and Spellbinder: Land of the Dragon Lord (1997). The series was a popular children's fantasy program, first broadcast in 1995.

Other television productions she has appeared in include: the miniseries Bodyline (1984), Land of Hope (1986), Embassy (1992) and A Country Practice. In 1998, she starred in the miniseries drama The Day of the Roses, in which she played a victim of the 1977 Granville rail disaster. She has also appeared in episodes of Five Mile Creek (1984), Rake (2010), Miss Fisher's Murder Mysteries (2013), and Ms Fisher's Modern Murder Mysteries (2019). In 2021, she played Birdie in The Unusual Suspects.

In 2024, Mitchell was named as one of the cast for the miniseries The Narrow Road to the Deep North, and she played Margaux in the Paramount Plus series Fake. Mitchell was also named in the ABC series The Role of a Lifetime. On 22 June 2025, Mitchell was announced as part of the cast for Paramount+ series Two Years Later. On 22 September 2025, it was announced that Mitchell was in the cast for Stan series The Killings at Parrish Station.

On 23 April 2026, Mitchell was named in the extended cast for Paramount+ series Dalliance.

=== Stage ===
Mitchell is a foundation director and board member of the Sydney Theatre Company (STC). She first appeared at the STC in 1981, performing scenes of Shakespeare's Henry IV, Part 1 with Andrew Tighe for a workshop.

She has since appeared in dozens of productions for several Australian theatre companies, and has contributed to Terence Crawford's 2005 book Trade Secrets: Australian Actors and Their Craft.

Never Did Me Any Harm (Sydney Festival, January 2012), exploring parenting, was a joint production between STC and dance company Force Majeure. It starred Mitchell, Marta Dusseldorp, and Vincent Crowley, with a solo dance performed by dancer Sarah-Jayne Howard.

Mitchell co-wrote the script of Force Majeure's You Animal, You with artistic director Danielle Micich, which explored the sense of smell. She also starred in the performance, which premiered at the Sydney Festival in January 2018.

In 2022, it was announced that Mitchell would play the late justice Ruth Bader Ginsburg in the theatre production RBG: Of Many, One. In 2024, Mitchell again played Ginsburg for the 2024 Black Swan State Theatre Company season. Critics called Mitchell's performance as Ginsburg as a "tour de force". Mitchell would again reprise Ginsburg for the 2025 Sydney Theatre Company season.

== Filmography ==
=== Film ===
Year	Title	Role	Notes
1981	Hoodwink	Nurse 2	Feature film
1985	I Can't Get Started	Jill	TV film
1986	Malcolm	Barmaid	Feature film
1987	The Place at the Coast	Margot Ryan	Feature film
1988	The Everlasting Secret Family	Wife	Feature film
1989	The Water Trolley		TV film
1991	Proof	Martin's Mother	Feature film
1994	Muriel's Wedding	Bridal manageress #1	Feature film
1995	Bathing Boxes	1st woman	Short film
1996	Children of the Revolution	Mrs. Savage	Feature film
1997	Thank God He Met Lizzie	Melanie	Feature film
1998	A Little Bit of Soul	Grace Michael	TV film
2000	On the Beach	British anchorwoman	TV film
2000	The Love of Lionel's Life	Det Sgt	TV film
2002	Black and White	Roma Chamberlain	Feature film
2003	Travelling Light	Betty Ferris	Feature film
2004	The Brush-Off	Fiona Lambert	TV film
2005	Hell Has Harbour Views	Anne	TV film
2005	Da Kath & Kim Code	Heather	TV film
2006	The Society Murders	Sally Honan	TV film
2006	Irresistible	Rina	Feature film
2006	Mohammad Hossain's Intensive Care	Herself – Narrator	Documentary film
2007	Romulus, My Father	Television presenter	Feature film
2007	Rogue	Elizabeth Smith	Feature film
2008	Three Blind Mice	Kathy	Feature film
2008	Seize the Day	Valentine	Short film
2008	Emerald Falls	Catherine Reid	TV film
2009	A Model Daughter: The Killing of Caroline Byrne	June Dally-Watkins	TV film
2010	A Love Story	Julia	Short film
2010	The Wedding Party	Rose	Feature film
2010	Griff the Invisible	Bronwyn	Feature film
2011	The Moment	Narrator (voice)	Short film
2011	Afterglow	Kate Whitcomb	Short film
2011	The Eye of the Storm	June	Feature film
2011	Snobs	Mother	TV film
2011	Underbelly Files: The Man Who Got Away	Rose McMillan	TV film
2012	The Fort	Joanna	Short film
2012	Census	Sue	Short film
2012	The Red Valentine	The Mother	Short film
2012	Sanctuary	Aunty / Nurse	Short film
2012	Jack Irish: Bad Debts	Mrs. Vane	TV film
2013	Ravage	Clare	Short film
2013	The Great Gatsby	Daisy's Mother	Feature film
2013	The Fragments	Heather	Short film
2014	Maya the Bee	Thekla the Spider / The Nurse (voice)	Animated feature film
2014	Love is Now	Evelyn	Feature film
2015	Drown	Helen	Feature film
2016	Unified	Janet Boyce	Short film
2017	Lets Get Marriage Equality in Australia	Herself	Short film
2018	Riot	Joan / Checkerboard Interviewer	TV film
2018	Dots	The Lady	Short film
2018	Loud Thoughts	Valerie	Short film
2018	Pimped	Sophia Hanson	Feature film
2019	Palm Beach	Eva	Feature film
2021	Daddy's Perfect Little Girl	Fay Broward	TV film
2022	Bosch & Rockit	Wendy	Feature film
2022	Blaze	Jackie Stevens	Feature film
2023	Jones Family Christmas	Heather Jones	TV film
2024	Ricky Stanicky	Leona	Feature film
2024	200% Wolf	Lady Hightail (voice)	Animated feature film
TBA†	Wedding of the Year	Eleanor	Pre-production

†	Not yet released

=== Television ===
Year	Title	Role	Notes
1981	Cop Shop	Michelle Beasley	TV series, 1 episode
1981	Ratbags	Various characters	TV series, 1 episode
1982	A Country Practice	Peggy	TV series, 2 episodes
1984	Five Mile Creek	Jocelyn	TV series, 1 episode
1984	Bodyline	Edith Clarke	Miniseries
1986	Land of Hope	Helen Davies	Miniseries
1986	The Fast Lane	Eileen	TV series, 1 episode
1989-95	G.P.	Julia / Bianca Resteghini	TV series, 3 episodes
1991	Boys from the Bush	Joyce	TV series, 1 episode
1992	Embassy	Gillian	TV series, 1 episode
1993	Seven Deadly Sins		TV anthology series, 1 episode
1993	A Country Practice	Dr. Simone Fox	TV series, 2 episodes
1993	Clowning Around	Sarah Gunner	TV series, season 2
1994	The Ferals	Crystal	TV series, 1 episode
1994	Cody: A Family Affair	Inspector Genevieve Simmonds	TV film
1994	Cody: The Tipof	Inspector Genevieve Simmonds	TV film
1994	Cody: Bad Love	Inspector Genevieve Simmonds	TV film
1995	Spellbinder	Ashka	TV series, 24 episodes
1996	Mercury	Erica Boyer	Miniseries, 1 episode
1997	Spellbinder: Land of the Dragon Lord	Ashka	TV series
1998	The Day of the Roses	Margaret Shuttler	Miniseries
2002	All Saints	Louise Malloy	TV series, 1 episode
2003	Snobs	Mary	TV series, 1 episode
2004	Jessica	Ada Thomas	Miniseries
2007	Rain Shadow	Sarah Balfour	TV series (main role)
2008	Blue Water High	Heather	TV series, 1 episode
2009	Rogue Nation	Elizabeth Macarthur	TV series, 1 episode
2009	Chandon Pictures	Agent	TV series, 1 episode
2009	All Saints	Gemma McKenzie	TV series, 1 episode
2010	Satisfaction	Georgia	TV series, 1 episode
2010	The Pacific	Mrs. Keller	Miniseries, 1 episode
2010	Rake	Jan Chandler	TV series, 1 episode
2011	Killing Time	Judge Hale	TV series, 2 episodes
2011	Crownies	Judge Walker	TV series, 8 episodes
2011	Spirited	Helen Payne	TV series, 8 episodes
2012	Dance Academy	Robyn	TV series, 1 episode
2013–18	A Place to Call Home	Prudence Swanson	TV series, 22 episodes
2013	Power Games: The Packer-Murdoch War	Gretel Packer	Miniseries
2013	Miss Fisher's Murder Mysteries	Madame Fleuri	TV series, 1 episode
2014–2017	Janet King	Justice Victoria Walker	TV series, 4 episodes
2014–2017	Starting From... Now!	Elizabeth Peters	TV series, 2 episodes
2015	Pypo		Web series, 1 episode
2015	Shit Creek	Helen	Web series, 2 episodes
2016	Molly	Pat Hatcher	Miniseries, 1 episode
2017	Newton's Law	Caroline Gale	TV series, 1 episode
2018	Away	Gwen	TV play
2019	Ms Fisher's Modern Murder Mysteries	Edwina Maddox	TV series, 1 episode
2019	Harrow	Louise Whitehall	TV series. 3 episodes
2019	Reef Break	Maeve Devlin	TV series, 4 episodes
2019	The Strange Chores	Inspector (voice)	TV series, 1 episode
2019, 2021	Upright	Jen Flynn	TV series
2020	Grey Nomads	Ingrid	Web series
2020	The Secrets She Keeps	Jenny	Miniseries, 3 episodes
2020	Operation Buffalo	Caroline Syddell	TV series, 2 episodes
2021	Wakefield	Belle Knight	TV series, 2 episodes
2021	Homespun	Pamela Monterra	Miniseries
2021	The Unusual Suspects	Birdie	Miniseries, 4 episodes
2022	Darby and Joan	Rosemary	TV series, 3 episodes
2022-23	Love Me	Anita	Miniseries
2023	Gold Diggers	Colleen	TV series, 3 episodes
2024	Pleasant Avenue	Carolyn	TV series, 5 episodes
2024	Fake	Margeaux	TV series, 8 episodes
2025	The Role of a Lifetime	Nan	TV series 2 episodes
2025	The Narrow Road to the Deep North	Older Ella	Miniseries
2026	Two Years Later	Lorna	TV series
2026	The Killings at Parrish Station	Georgia Cook (Present Day)	TV series: 6 episodes
2026	Dalliance	Dani	TV series

=== Other appearances ===
Year	Title	Role	Notes
2012	Agony Aunts	Herself	TV series, 3 episodes
2023	Australian Story	Herself	TV series, 1 episode
2023	Luxury Escapes	Herself	TV series, 1 episode

== Stage ==
Mitchell's stage performances include:

Year	Play	Role	Notes
1975	1 Double-D		NIDA Theatre
1976	Hay Fever	Judith Bliss	School production
1978	Gammer Gurton's Needle		NIDA Theatre
1979	The Seagull		NIDA Theatre
1979	Lower Depths		NIDA Theatre
1979	The Caucasian Chalk Circle		Sydney Opera House with STC
1979	The Fire Raisers		NIDA Theatre
1979	Beyond Mozambique		NIDA Theatre
1979	Saved		Jane Street Theatre with NIDA
1980	The Women Pirates Ann Bonney and Mary Read		NIDA Theatre, University of Newcastle, Playhouse, Canberra
1980	Strife		NIDA Theatre
1981	Henry IV, Part 1		STC workshop with Andrew Tighe
1981	Roses in Due Season		Nimrod Theatre Company
1981	Rare Words - Brave Deeds		Sydney Opera House with STC
1981	The Revenger's Tragedy	Court Lady	Playhouse, Adelaide with STCSA
1981	No End of Blame		Playhouse, Adelaide with STCSA
1982	The Suicide		Nimrod Theatre Company
1982	You Can't Take It with You		Sydney Opera House with STC
1982	Macbeth	Witch	Sydney Opera House with STC
1982	As You Desire Me		Sydney Opera House with STC
1983	The Fields of Heaven		Sydney Opera House with STC
1983	The Cherry Orchard	Vanya	Sydney Opera House with STC
1984	The Lady from the Sea	Bolette	Playhouse, Adelaide with STCSA
1984	Private Lives	Amanda Prynne	Araluen Arts Centre & Playhouse, Adelaide with STCSA
1985	The Doll Trilogy: Summer of the Seventeenth Doll, Kid Stakes & Other Times	Nancy	Sydney Opera House & Melbourne Athenaeum with STC & MTC
1986	No Worries		Wharf Theatre with STC, Playhouse, Adelaide (adapted into a film in 1994)
1986	She Stoops to Conquer	Kate Hardcastle	Playhouse, Melbourne with MTC
1986	Pravda	Rebecca Foley	Playhouse, Adelaide with STCSA
1987	Hamlet / Henry IV Part 1		STC
1987	No(h) Exit: No Exit, The Lady Aoi, Hanjo from Five Modern Noh Plays		Wharf Theatre with STC
1987	Pericles		Wharf Theatre with STC
1987	Blood Relations	Cathy / Tessa	Sydney Opera House with STC & Playhouse, Adelaide with STCSA
1988	1841		Sydney Opera House & Playhouse, Adelaide
1989	A Dream Play		Playhouse, Adelaide & Sydney Opera House with STC & STCSA
1989	Major Barbara		Playhouse Adelaide & Suncorp Theatre, Brisbane with STCSA & Queensland Theatre
1989	All My Sons		Wharf Theatre with STC
1989	Ring Round the Moon		Playhouse, Adelaide with STCSA
1990	The Secret Rapture	Isobel Glass	Wharf Theatre with STC
1990	Burn This	Anna	Wharf Theatre with STC
1991	Uncle Vanya	Yelena	Russell Street Theatre with MTC
1991	Morning Sacrifice	Miss Gwyn Carwithen	Russell Street Theatre with MTC
1991	Hay Fever	Myra Arundel	Playhouse, Melbourne with MTC
1992	The Homecoming		Wharf Theatre with STC
1993	Two Weeks with the Queen		Playhouse, Adelaide with STC
1993	Coriolanus	Virgilia	Sydney Opera House with STC
1995	Scenes from a Separation	Nina Moss	Fairfax Studio with MTC
1997	The Winter's Tale	Hermione	Canberra Theatre, Sydney Opera House & Melbourne Athenaeum with Bell Shakespeare
1998	A Delicate Balance		Sydney Opera House with STC
2000	The White Devil		Theatre Royal, Sydney with STC
2001	Bye Bye Birdie		
2003	The Real Thing	Charlotte	Wharf Theatre with STC
2007	Self Esteem		Wharf Theatre with STC
2008	Tender	Yvonne	The Butter Factory Theatre, Wodonga, Stables Theatre, Sydney & Belvoir Street Theatre with HotHouse Theatre & Griffin Theatre Company
2008	Hamlet	Gertrude	Sydney Opera House & Playhouse, Melbourne with Bell Shakespeare
2008	Ghosts	Helene	Dunstan Playhouse, Adelaide with STCSA
2010	A Midsummer Night's Dream	Titania	Sydney Symphony Orchestra
2010	True West	Mom	STC
2011	Neighbourhood Watch	Christina	Belvoir Street Theatre
2012	Never Did Me Any Harm		Wharf Theatre with STC Force Majeure
2012	Les Liaisons Dangereuses	Madame Volanges	Wharf Theatre with STC
2012	Signs of Life	Georgie Jutland	Sydney Opera House with STC (also producer)
2013	The History Boys	Mrs Lintott	Sydney Opera House with Peach Theatre Company
2013	Rosencrantz and Guildenstern Are Dead	Gertrude	Sydney Theatre with STC
2014	Strictly Ballroom	Shirley Hastings	Sydney Lyric Theatre, Her Majesty's Theatre, Melbourne & Lyric Theatre, Brisbane
2016	Hay Fever	Judith Bliss	Sydney Opera House with STC
2016	The Hansard Monologues: Age of Entitlement		Seymour Centre, Bruce Gordon Theatre, Wollongong, Glen Street Theatre & Old Parliament House, Canberra
2017	Away	Gwen	Sydney Opera House & Malthouse Theatre with STC
2017	Cloud Nine	Edward / Betty	Wharf Theatre with STC
2017–18	You Animal, You	Mum	Track 12 at Carriageworks with Force Majeure
2018	Top Girls	Pope Joan / Louise	Sydney Opera House with STC
2018	Still Point Turning: The Catherine McGregor Story	Cate McGregor	Wharf Theatre with STC
2018	The Harp in the South, Part One and Part Two	Eny Kilker	STC
2019–20	The Iliad - Out Loud	Odysseus / Hera / Hecuba	Belvoir Street Theatre, Scott Theatre, Adelaide
2020	Escaped Alone		Belvoir Street Theatre
2020	Away		Online with Malthouse Theatre, Melbourne & STC
2021	Playing Beatie Bow	Granny	Wharf Theatre with STC
2022-26	RBG: Of Many, One	Ruth Bader Ginsburg	Wharf Theatre, Sydney Opera House & Playhouse, Brisbane with STC, Black Swan Theatre, Auckland Theatre

== Awards and nominations ==
Year	Work	Award	Result	Ref
2011	Afterglow (short film)	NYC International Film Festival Award for Best Lead Actress	Won	
2012	The Red Valentine (short film)	NYC International Film Festival Award for Best Lead Actress	Won	
2014	Power Games: The Packer-Murdoch War (for 'Part 1')	AACTA Award for Best Guest or Supporting Actress in a Television Drama	Nominated	
2014	Power Games: The Packer-Murdoch War (for 'Part 1')	Equity Award for Outstanding Performance by an Ensemble in a Miniseries or Telemovie	Nominated	
2019	Significant Service to the Performing Arts, and to the Community	Member of the Order of Australia (AM)	Won	
2022	Love Me	Silver Logie Award for Most Outstanding Supporting Actress	Won	
2022	Love Me	AACTA Award for Best Supporting Actress in a Drama	Nominated	
2022	Homespun	Septimus Award for Best Oceanian Actress	Nominated	
2023	RBG: Of Many, One (as Ruth Bader Ginsberg)	Sydney Theatre Award for Best Performer in a Leading Role in a Mainstage Production	Won	
2024	Love Me	AACTA Award for Best Guest or Supporting Actress in a Television Drama	Won	

== Publications ==
- Heather Mitchell (2023) Everything and Nothing ISBN 9781761067303

== Personal life ==
Mitchell met cinematographer Martin McGrath on a film set in Broken Hill in 1989. They were engaged in the following year and married in February 1992. The couple have two adult children and, as of 2021, reside in Sydney.

Mitchell was made a Member of the Order of Australia in the 2020 Australia Day Honours for "significant service to the performing arts, and to the community."
