= Mark Owen-Taylor =

Australian actor (born 1962)

- Born: 27 January 1962 (age 64); Australia
- Occupations: Actor, narrator, voice artist
- Years active: 1984−present
- Known for: A Country Practice; Hey Dad!

Mark Owen-Taylor (born 27 January 1962) is an Australian actor, who has also worked variously as a narrator and voice-over artist.

== Early life ==
Owen-Taylor initially wanted to be a teacher and attended Melbourne State College for four years. Upon deciding to become an actor, he applied to the National Institute of Dramatic Art (NIDA), from where he graduated in 1984.

== Career ==
Owen-Taylor first appeared in a stage production of The Taming of the Shrew with the Sydney Shakespeare in the Park company, the docu-drama Flowers of Rethymnon and the miniseries Land of Hope.

His role in the latter series helped him win his part in A Country Practice, as they were produced by the same company. He appeared as high school teacher Peter Manning from 1986 to 1987, appearing for 88 episodes. He is also known for replacing Robert Hughes as the star of Hey Dad! for its final two seasons from 1993 to 1994.

Owen-Taylor has appeared in numerous television series, including Heartbreak High, Water Rats and All Saints, as well appearing in many theatre productions.

== Filmography ==
=== Film ===
Date	Title	Role	Type
1985	I Can’t Get Started	Kris	Film
1986	Flowers of Rethymnon		Docudrama film
1991	Act of Necessity	Ben Coleman	TV movie
1995	Cody: The Wrong Stuff	Peter	TV movie
1997	Thank God He Met Lizzie	Neil	Feature film
2003	Horseplay	Charles Winterbottom	Feature film
2003	BlackJack	Tim	TV movie
2004	Am Kap der Liebe	Norse Penny	TV movie
2005	Sanctuary	Daniel Harkin	Short film
2010	Lani's Story	Judge / Narrator	TV movie
2011	Culling (aka Sheltered)	Marcus	Short film
2018	Riot	Rector	TV movie

=== Television ===
Date	Title	Role	Type
1986	Land of Hope	Andrew Quinn	Miniseries
1986–1987	A Country Practice	Peter Manning	88 episodes
1989–1991	E Street	Adam Lucas / Dennis Carroll	20 episodes
1992; 1993–1994	Hey Dad!	TV reporter / Greg Russell	30 episodes
1998	Water Rats	Jimmy Reid	1 episode
1998	Murder Call	Dr Adam Klein	1 episode
1999	Heartbreak High	Tim Mason	14 episodes
2000–2001	Play School	Presenter	6 episodes
2000–2003	Grass Roots	Andrew Abetz	3 episodes
2001–2002	Cybergirl	Hugh Campbell	23 episodes
2001–2002	BackBerner	James Clayton	2 episodes
2003	Against the Wind	Maurice Penny	Miniseries
2006	I Shouldn't Be Alive	Chip Jaffurs	Documentary series, 1 episode
2006	Two Twisted	Dr Max Smart	Miniseries, 1 episode
2006–2009	All Saints	Doug Berryman / Bunty Hardbottle	2 episodes
2007	The Adventures of Gracie Lou	Granddad (voice)	Animated TV series
2009	Fairweather Man	Narrator	Documentary
2014	Guess How Much I Love You	Big Nutbrown Hare (voice)	Animated TV special
2018	Dr Max	Dr Swanson	

== Theatre ==
Date	Title	Role	Type
	The Taming of the Shrew		Shakespeare in the Park
1983	Peer Gynt	Peer Gynt 8	NIDA Theatre, Sydney
1983	Ivanov		NIDA Theatre, Sydney
1983	A Midsummer Night’s Dream	Theseus / Cobweb	NIDA Theatre, Sydney
1984	Bleedin' Butterflies	Jack Broadbent	NIDA Theatre, Sydney
1984	Pericles & The Comedy of Errors	Antipholus	NIDA Parade Theatre, Playhouse, Canberra, Community Arts Theatre, Newcastle
1984	Street Scene		NIDA Theatre, Sydney
1987	The Merry Wives of Windsor	Ford	Albert Park Amphitheatre, Brisbane with QTC for Warana Festival
1988	Absurd Person Singular		Playhouse, Adelaide with STCSA
1988	Haircut		Wharf Theatre with STC & Six Years Old Theatre Company
1988	Strictly Ballroom		Wharf Theatre with STC & Six Years Old Theatre Company
1988	Angels		Wharf Theatre with STC & Six Years Old Theatre Company
1989	Czech-Mate		Bay Street Theatre, Sydney
1990	The Imaginary Invalid		NIDA Theatre, Sydney
1990	Macbeth		NIDA Theatre, Sydney
1992	Time and the Room		Wharf Theatre with STC
1994	Short, Sharp Shocks		Stables Theatre, Sydney with Griffin Theatre Company
1994; 1995	The Shaughraun	Captain Molineaux	Playhouse, Melbourne, Sydney Opera House with STC & MTC
1995	Christmas at Turkey Beach		Suncorp Theatre, Brisbane with QTC
1996	Playgrounds		Wharf Theatre with STC
1996	Medea	Tutor / Messenger	Wharf Theatre with STC
1998	Del Del	Des	STC
1999	Daylight Saving	Joshua Makepeace	Marian St Theatre, Sydney
1999	Life Support	Pat O'Brien	Ensemble Theatre, Sydney
1999	Educating Rita		Ensemble Theatre, Sydney
2003	The Way of the World	Petulant	Sydney Opera House with STC
2003; 2006	Love’s Triumph	Hoover J Idiott	Darlinghurst Theatre, Sydney with Three Ways Theatre Company
2004	Twelfth Night	Fabian	Sydney Opera House, Playhouse, Melbourne, Playhouse, Canberra, Illawarra Performing Arts Centre, Orange Civic Theatre with Bell Shakespeare
2006	Two Weeks with the Queen	Bob / Griff	Dunstan Playhouse, Adelaide, Riverside Theatres Parramatta with Windmill Performing Arts & STCSA
2006	Woman in Mind	Tony	Sydney Opera House with STC
2007	Stella by Starlight	Paul	Ensemble Theatre, Sydney
2008; 2010	Just Macbeth!	Douglas / various roles	Playhouse, Melbourne, Seymour Centre, Sydney, Sydney Opera House with Bell Shakespeare, Assembly George Square with Edinburgh Festival Fringe
2009	Absurd Person Singular	Geoffrey	Ensemble Theatre, Sydney
2011	My Wonderful Day	Kevin Tate	Ensemble Theatre, Sydney
2012	Yes, Prime Minister	PM Jim Hacker	Australia & New Zealand tour
2013	The 13-Storey Treehouse	Terry	The Concourse, Sydney, Seymour Centre, Sydney, Sydney Opera House with Christine Dunstan Productions
2014–2015	Strictly Ballroom the Musical	JJ Silvers	Sydney Lyric Theatre, Her Majesty's Theatre, Melbourne, Lyric Theatre, Brisbane with Global Creatures
2022	The Lives of Eve		KXT – Kings X Theatre with Storytellers Festival
	Six Years Old		Wharf Theatre, Sydney with STC
