= Rakel Wärmländer =

Swedish actress (born 1980)

- Born: October 3, 1980 (age 45)
- Education: Malmö Theatre Academy
- Occupation: Actress
- Years active: 1996–present
- Children: 2
- Father: Tom Zacharias

Rakel Amalia Wärmländer (née Zacharias; born 3 October 1980) is a Swedish actress.

== Early life and education ==
She was born on 3 October 1980 to Tom Zacharias and Dorotea Wärmländer. She lived with her mother and three older brothers. When she was five years old, Dorotea remarried to the then governor of Stockholm, Lennart Sandgren, and the family moved to Tessin Palace.

She started with theater work at the age of nine in the play Kalas i Lönneberga at the Royal Dramatic Theatre in Stockholm. When she was nineteen she moved to New York City and studied theater at the Neighborhood Playhouse School of the Theatre for one year. After she returned home to Sweden, she started working at Teater Galeasen in Stockholm with the company Darling Desperados, founded by Ulrika Malmgren. She graduated from Malmö Theatre Academy in 2006.

== Career ==
Wärmländer has worked mostly in television and film. She played in the television mini-series Skuggornas hus (1996) where she played the character Tina. She has also played in shows such as Cleo, Skilda världar and Spung. She acted in the Helena Bergström film Se upp för dårarna, and also Hipphipp!, Itzhaks julevangelium and the Martin Beck film Okänd avsändare.

In late 2007, Wärmländer played Pippi Longstocking in the Jonna Nordenskiöld play Pippi Långstrump - världens starkaste, and also the character Tessa in the play Juloratoriet at the Stockholm City Theatre. She performed the voice acting for the character Fio in the animated film Porco Rosso.

She played the lead role in the Swedish feature film Love and Lemons (Swedish: Små citroner gula), which premiered on 20 February 2013. Her real-life friend actress Josephine Bornebusch played her friend in the film. In 2012, she played a role in the Caryl Churchill feminist drama Top Girls at the Stockholm City Theatre. She acted again in a Helena Bergström-directed film in the comedy En underbar jävla jul, where she plays a surrogate mother for her two best friends who are gay and want a child. The film premiered on 13 November 2015.

== Personal life ==
She has two daughters with actor Lars Bringås.
