= Love Me (South Korean TV series) =

2025 South Korean television series

- Promotional poster
- Hangul: 러브 미
- RR: Reobeu mi
- MR: Rŏbŭ mi
- Genre: Family drama; Melodrama; Slice of life
- Based on: Älska mig by Josephine Bornebusch
- Written by: Park Eun-young; Park Hee-kwon
- Directed by: Jo Young-min
- Starring: Seo Hyun-jin; Yoo Jae-myung; Lee Si-woo; Dahyun; Chang Ryul; Yoon Se-ah
- Music by: Kim Jang-woo; Kim Seong-hyeon
- Country of origin: South Korea
- Original language: Korean
- No. of episodes: 12

Production
- Running time: 70 minutes
- Production companies: SLL; How Pictures

Original release
- Network: JTBC
- Release: December 19, 2025 – January 23, 2026

Related
- Love Me (Swedish); Love Me (Australian)

Love Me (Korean: 러브 미) is a 2025-26 South Korean television series co-written by Park Eun-young and Park Hee-won, directed by Jo Young-min, and starring Seo Hyun-jin, Yoo Jae-myung, Lee Si-woo, Dahyun, Chang Ryul, and Yoon Se-ah. Based on Swedish comedy-drama television series Älska mig, it tells the story of a woman who appears to have it all, but is desperately lonely and hiding a secret that she is afraid to admit. It aired on JTBC from December 19, 2025, to January 23, 2026, every Friday at 20:50 (KST). It is also available to stream in Korea on TVING and Netflix, and internationally on global platforms such as U-Next, Viki and Viu.

== Cast and characters ==
- Seo Hyun-jin as Seo Jun-kyung
- Chang Ryul as Joo Do-hyun
- Lee Si-woo as Seo Jun-seo

A former swimmer and current high school physical education and education intern.

- Yoo Jae-myung as Seo Jin-ho
- Yoon Se-ah as Jin Ja-young
- Dahyun as Ji Hye-on

== Production ==
=== Development ===
Love Me is directed by Jo Young-min, whose works include The Interest of Love (2022), and You and Everything Else (2025), and written by Park Eun-young, Park Hee-kwon. It is co-produced by SLL and How Pictures.

=== Casting ===
According to Sports Dong-a, Lee Si-woo will be appearing in the series. In February 2025, the casting of Seo Hyun-jin, Yoo Jae-myung, Lee, Chang Ryul, Yoon Se-ah, and Dahyun were officially confirmed.

== Release ==
Love Me is scheduled to premiere on JTBC on December 19, 2025, and will air every Friday at 20:50 (KST).

== Viewership ==
Love Me : South Korea viewers per episode (thousands)

Season	Episode number											
Season	1	2	3	4	5	6	7	8	9	10	11	12
1	495	434	N/A	N/A	N/A	N/A	N/A	N/A	390	N/A	N/A	N/A

Source: Audience measurement performed nationwide by Nielsen Korea.

Average TV viewership ratings
Ep.	Original broadcast date	Average audience share	
Ep.	Original broadcast date	(Nielsen Korea)	
Ep.	Original broadcast date	Nationwide	Seoul
1	December 19, 2025	2.155% (7th)	2.228% (5th)
2	December 19, 2025	1.5% (7th)	N/A
3	December 26, 2025	1.9% (12th)	1.738% (10th)
4	December 26, 2025	1.8% (12th)	N/A
5	January 2, 2025	1.76% (16th)	1.970% (10th)
6	January 2, 2025	1.1% (16th)	N/A
7	January 9, 2026	1.78% (11th)	1.868% (8th)
8	January 9, 2026	1.27% (11th)	N/A
9	January 16, 2026	1.7% (13th)	1.727% (8th)
10	January 16, 2026	1.5% (13th)	1.713% (9th)
11	January 23, 2026	1.5% (17th)	N/A
12	January 23, 2026	1.6% (17th)	1.677% (10th)
Average		1.63%	— (Note: Due to multiple unpublished ratings, the exact average rating is unknown.)
In the table above, the blue numbers represent the lowest ratings and the red numbers represent the highest ratings.; N/A denotes ratings that were not published.; This drama aired on a cable channel/pay TV which normally has a relatively smaller audience compared to free-to-air TV/public broadcasters (KBS, SBS, MBC, and EBS).

== Accolades ==
Award ceremony	Year	Category	Recipient(s)	Result	Ref.
Baeksang Arts Awards	2026	Best Supporting Actor	Yoo Jae-myung	Nominated	
Global OTT Awards	2026	Best Newcomer (Female)	Dahyun	Nominated	
Global OTT Awards	2026	Rising Star of the Year	Dahyun	Won	
