= Maggie Dent =

Australian parenting author

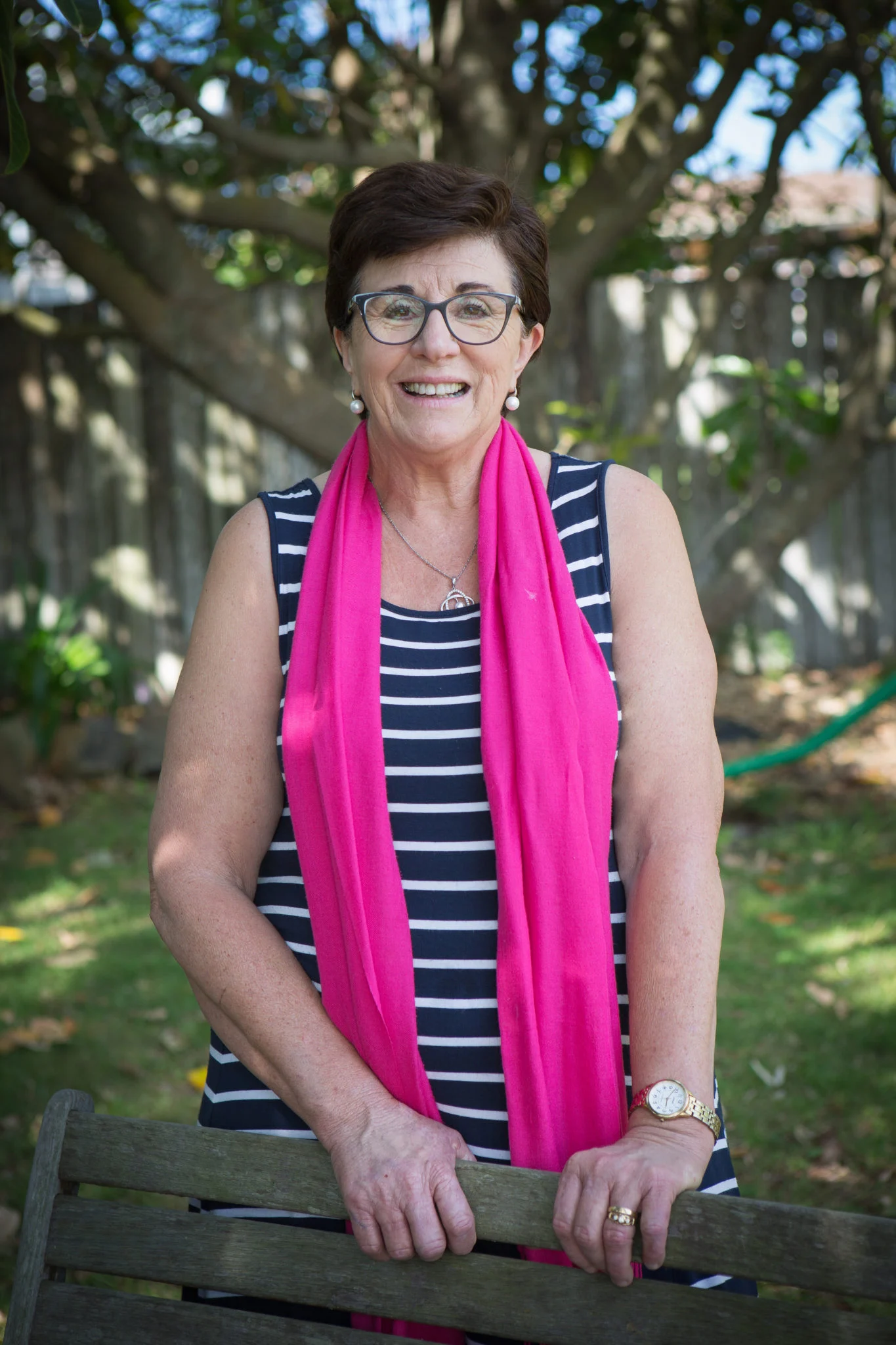
- Born: 1955 (age 70–71)
- Education: BA, DipEd, DipCounselling
- Website: https://maggiedent.com

Maggie Dent (born 28 March 1955) is an Australian parenting author, educator and speaker. She has written a number of books, holds and speaks at events in Australia, and appears on radio and television. She is the host of the ABC’s Parental As Anything podcast. And in 2023 she began hosting the ACAST Good Enough Dad podcast.

== Life and early career ==
Dent was born in Wandering, Western Australia, on a sheep and wheat farm, where she was raised with her five brothers and sisters. The siblings helped on the farm, and Dent attributes the farming lifestyle and working with animals to giving her an insight into life and death. Dent attended boarding school and then university in Western Australia, where she decided to study teaching instead of journalism as planned. She became a teacher, however, also became involved in palliative care and worked as a counsellor, in suicide prevention, and as a funeral celebrant. She has four sons.

== Career and work ==
Dent is the author of 17 books on parenting. In her work she recommends that growing children receive plenty of fresh air, exercise, good food, freedom to take risks and explore. She advocates for limited screen time and more time spent with friends citing the health and psychological benefits of nature play. She also promotes play-based learning in the early years, claiming that the education system in Australia is behind that of other countries because it follows the UK and American models of one-size-fits-all, standardised testing and pushes formalised education into early years.

She has stated that a ‘crisis’ exists in the education of boys which she claims has been acknowledged by the OECD (Organisation for Economic Cooperation and Development), which found girls are less likely to drop out of school than boys and the gap in their reading levels was equivalent to one year's worth of schooling. She is an advocate for children's rights, especially the right for children to play, to learn from their mistakes, and to learn to be resilient. Through this work she has been referred to as the "queen of common sense".

In 2025 Dent appeared in ABC series The Role of a Lifetime. Dent is a founding member of the CTRL+SHFT online safety coalition, launched in 2025.

In April 2026, Maggie was awarded an Honorary Doctorate of Letters from The University of Wollongong for her "strong commitment to social responsibility and the communities we serve".

=== Charity work ===
Dent is a patron of the Bold Park Community School in Perth and the Western Australia Association of Teacher Assistants (WAATA). She is an ambassador for The Sanctuary – The Hills Women's shelter in New South Wales. She is also an advocate for The Kids Research Institute Australia (formerly Telethon Research Institute).

== Bibliography ==
Her books include:

- Saving Our Children from Our Chaotic World: Teaching Children the Magic of Silence and Stillness (rev ed, 2009)
- Nurturing Kids’ Hearts and Souls: Building Emotional, Social and Spiritual Competency (rev ed 2010)
- Real Kids in an Unreal World: How to Build Resilience and Self-Esteem in Today’s Children (2nd ed 2017)
- Saving Our Adolescents: Supporting Today’s Adolescents through the Bumpy Ride to Adulthood (2010)
- Black Duck Wisdom (rev ed 2011)
- 9 Things: A Back-to-Basics Guide to Calm, Common-sense, Connected Parenting Birth-8 (2014)
- Some Secrets for the Modern-Day Mammoth Hunter: Becoming and Being a Good Man (2014)
- My Cool Plastics Cupboard (a picture book illustrated by Linda True-Arrow) (2015)
- Building Children’s Resilience: Essential Tips for Parents of Children Birth-12 (2015)
- A Dog’s Life Wisdoms: 21 Life Wisdoms from a Dog Called Jess (2016).
- Building Children's Resilience: One building block at a time (2016)
- Mothering our Boys: A guide for mums of sons (2018)
- From Boys to Men: Guiding our teen boys to grow into happy, healthy men (2020)
- Parental as Anything: A common-sense guide to raising happy, healthy kids – from toddlers to tweens(2021)
- Girlhood: Raising our little girls to be healthy, happy and heard (2022)
- Help Me Help My Teen (2024)
- Digital Freedom: A guide to less screen time for safer, happier and healthier families with Kirra Pendergast (2026)
