= Dalliance (TV series) =

- Genre: Drama
- Directed by: Matthew Saville; Emma Jackson
- Starring: Hugo Weaving; David Wenham; Heather Mitchell; Georgie Parker; Catherine McClements; Wayne Blair
- Country of origin: Australia
- Original language: English
- No. of episodes: 6

Original release
- Network: Paramount+
- Release: 27 August 2026

Dalliance is a 2026 Australian television drama series for Paramount+ Australia. Produced by Roadshow Rough Diamond, the series focuses on Billy and Rose and their group of friends, who think they have life all figured out in their 60s, but they are forced to rethink all that when it is not what they expected. All six episodes premiered on 27 August 2026.

== Plot ==
A group of friends navigating lives in their 60s finding out it is a lot more different than what they thought it would be. When their friend dies, mourning his loss the friend group finds their lives are much more than what the world would want them to feel.

== Cast ==
On 23 April 2026, the cast for the series was announced.

- Hugo Weaving as Billy Brennan
- Heather Mitchell as Dani
- David Wenham as Gary
- Ryan Panizza as Dylan
- Georgie Parker as Rose Brennan
- Wayne Blair as Luke
- Carolyn Bock as Adele
- Catherine McClements as Sarah
- Russell Dykstra as Rex
- Kate Winter as Emma
- John Doyle as James

== Production ==
On 6 November 2025 during the upfront event for Channel 10 and Paramount+, the series was one of two local drama series announced alongside other drama Two Years Later.

The series was produced by Roadshow Rough Diamond and received funding from Screen NSW's Made in NSW fund. It was directed by Matthew Saville and Emma Jackson.

== Release ==
All six episodes premiered on Paramount+ on 27 August 2026.

== Reception ==
The Guardian film critic Lucy Mangan gave the series 4 stars out of 5, calling it "a rare drama so beautifully written you will be instantly devoted".
