= Love and Lemons =

- Theatrical release poster
- Directed by: Teresa Fabik
- Screenplay by: Lars V. Johansson; Johan Kindblom
- Based on: Yesterday's News by Kajsa Ingemarsson
- Produced by: Pontus Sjöman
- Starring: Rakel Wärmländer; Dan Ekborg; Josephine Bornebusch; Richard Ulfsäter; Sverrir Gudnason; Tomas von Brömssen; Anki Lidén; Eric Ericson; Sofia Rönnegård; David Tainton
- Cinematography: Anders Bohman
- Edited by: Håkan Karlsson
- Music by: Klas Wahl; Anders Niska
- Production company: Tre Vänner Produktion AB
- Distributed by: Nordisk Film
- Release date: 20 February 2013 (Sweden)
- Running time: 99 minutes
- Country: Sweden
- Language: Swedish

Love and Lemons (Swedish: Små citroner gula) is a 2013 Swedish romantic comedy film directed by Teresa Fabik, based on the novel Yesterday's News by Kajsa Ingemarsson.

== Cast ==
- Rakel Wärmländer as Agnes
- Dan Ekborg as Gerard
- Josephine Bornebusch as Lussan
- Sverrir Gudnason as David Kummel
- Tomas von Brömssen as pappa Sven
- Anki Lidén as mamma Maud
- Eric Ericson as Kalle
- Richard Ulfsäter as Tobias
