= Älska mig (TV series) =

Swedish television series

- Genre: Comedy drama
- Written by: Josephine Bornebusch
- Directed by: Josephine Bornebusch
- Country of origin: Sweden
- Original language: Swedish
- No. of seasons: 2
- No. of episodes: 12

Original release
- Network: Viaplay
- Release: October 11, 2019 – 2020

Related
- Love Me (Australian remake); Love Me (South Korean remake)

Älska mig (Love Me) is a Swedish comedy-drama television series written and directed by Josephine Bornebusch, who also played the lead. The first season premiered on Viaplay on 11 October 2019 and on SVT on 10 April 2020. Älska mig won the 2020 "TV Drama Series of the Year" award at the Kristallen Awards.

== Cast ==
- Josephine Bornebusch – Clara
- Johan Ulveson – Sten
- Gustav Lindh – Aron
- Sverrir Gudnason – Peter
- Dilan Gwyn – Elsa
- Sofia Karemyr – Jenny
- Nina Zanjani – Sasha
- Görel Crona – Anita
- Ia Langhammer – Kersti
- Christopher Wagelin – Vincent
- Edvin Ryding – Viktor
- Henrik Schyffert – Thomas
- Meta Velander – Thomas mother

== Production ==
The series was written and directed by Josephine Bornebusch, who also played the lead.

== Release ==
Älska mig premiered on Viaplay on 11 October 2019 and on SVT on 10 April 2020.

The second season started airing on Viaplay on 13 April 2020.

An Australian production of Älska mig, titled Love Me, premiered in Australia in 2021 on Binge streaming service.

A South Korean remake of the show, also titled Love Me, premiered in 2025 on JTBC.

== Accolades ==
Älska mig won the 2020 Kristallen Award in the category "TV Drama Series of the Year".
