= Cody (TV series) =

- Genre: Drama
- Written by: Garry Disher, Christopher Lee
- Directed by: Andrew Prowse
- Starring: Gary Sweet, Heather Mitchell, Robert Mammone
- Theme music composer: Martin Armiger
- No. of episodes: 6

Production
- Producers: John Edwards, Sandra Levy
- Running time: 90 minutes
- Production company: Southern Star Xanadu

Original release
- Network: Seven Network
- Release: 1994 – 1995

Cody is a series of six Australian telemovies starring Gary Sweet that were made for the Seven Network in 1994 and 1995. Sweet played the title character Cody, an unconventional police detective, described by Screen Australia as a "larrikin cop, on the trail of crimes".

== Plot ==
Cody (Gary Sweet) is a Sydney-based police detective, with Fiorelli (Robert Mammone) as his partner and Inspector Genevieve Simmonds (Heather Mitchell) as their superior. In September 1994 Sweet described the title character to Nicole Leedham of The Canberra Times as "kind of risky and dangerous and pretty ruthless ... [He] ain't that much fun, I mean he's fun to play, but he's not that much fun as a guy. He's not your barrel of laughs."

In the first episode, Cody: A Family Affair (1994), the detective investigates a diamond-smuggling gang and poses as a dealer. He also searches for a missing teenager.

In the second episode, Cody: The Tipoff (1994), Cody's childhood friend Mack (Gary Waddell) provides a tip about a burglary in progress. Mack later turns up dead and Cody investigates another friend, Jimmy Catter (Frankie J. Holden).

In the third episode, Cody: Bad Love (1994), the squad's investigation of art thefts leads to a gallery run by an attractive French artist, Claudia (Rebecca Rigg).

The fourth episode, Cody: The Burnout (1995), includes Stella (Alexandra Fowler).

In the fifth episode, Cody: The Wrong Stuff (1995), the squad hunts a drug dealer (Mark Owen-Taylor).

In the sixth episode, Cody: Fall from Grace (1995), an apparent suicide leads to Sam Wolfe (Bill Hunter).

== Cast ==
=== Main ===
- Gary Sweet as Cody
- Robert Mammone as Fiorelli
- Heather Mitchell as Inspector Genevieve Simmonds (episodes 1–3)

=== A Family Affair ===
- Danny Adcock
- Bryan Marshall as Roche

=== The Tipoff ===
- Suzanne Gullabovska as Girl in Lift
- Gary Waddell as Mack
- Frankie J. Holden as Jimmy Catter

=== Bad Love ===
- Rebecca Rigg as Claudia
- Wendy Playfair as Mrs Unwin
- Rob Carlton as Slipper
- Lewis Fitz-Gerald as Martin Campbell
- Rhonda Doyle as Female Customs Officer

=== The Burnout ===
- Ally Fowler as Stella

=== The Wrong Stuff ===
- Maria Mercedes as Raquel
- Mark Owen-Taylor
- Scott Burgess as Mike

=== Fall from Grace ===
- Bill Hunter as Sam Wolfe
- Frank Gallacher as Duncan White

== Episodes ==
=== Season One ===
No.	Title	Original release date
1	"Cody: A Family Affair"	2 October 1994
Cody and Fiorelli try to catch diamond smugglers, but the gems are not where they were supposed to be. Cody embarks to infiltrate the dealers who brought the diamonds in from South Africa. He also searches for a missing teenager. (Danny Adcock)
2	"Cody: The Tipoff"	1994
Cody's childhood friend Mack (Gary Waddell) provides a tip about a burglary in progress. Mack later turns up dead and Cody investigates another friend Jimmy Catter (Frankie J. Holden).
3	"Cody: Bad Love"	1994
Cody’s investigation of an art theft leads him to Claudia (Rebecca Rigg) who works at an art gallery where the certificate of the stolen painting is held. His judgement may be clouded when he discovers the federal police suspect Claudia of smuggling the paintings.

=== Season Two ===
No.	Title	Original release date
4	"Cody: The Burnout"	1995
Cody goes undercover on a task force established to track down arsonists who are wreaking havoc in the city. Fiorelli and Cody race against time to obtain the information they need to get Cody out alive when they discover a corrupt officer is within their ranks. (Ally Fowler)
5	"Cody: The Wrong Stuff"	1995
A young girl dies after a batch of deadly pills find their way into a dance club scene. Cody and Fiorelli attempt to stop others from taking the lethal cocktail as they uncover an established underground manufacturer. (Mark Owen-Taylor, Scott Burgess, Maria Mercedes)
6	"Cody: Fall from Grace"	1995
A jockey is found dead in the street after falling from a balcony of a Hotel. What is thought to be a routine suicide inquiry becomes a murder investigation leading Cody to uncover a race-fixing scam. (Bill Hunter, Frank Gallacher)

== Home media ==
It was announced by Via Vision Entertainment in March 2019 that they would be releasing the Cody telemovies on DVD in two collections.

DVD name	Format	Ep #	Discs/Tapes	Region 4 (Australia)	Special features	Distributors
Cody Collection One	DVD	3	3	3 April 2019	None	Via Vision Entertainment & Madman Entertainment
Cody Collection Two	DVD	3	3	5 June 2019	None	Via Vision Entertainment & Madman Entertainment

== Awards and nominations ==
Gary Sweet was nominated for a Silver Logie as Most Popular Actor for the episode, Cody: The Burnout.

== See also ==
- List of Australian television series
- AACTA Award for Best Telefeature, Mini Series or Short Run Series
