= Love Your Enemy =

2024 South Korean television series

- Promotional poster
- Hangul: 사랑은 외나무다리에서
- Lit.: Love on a Single Tree Bridge
- RR: Sarangeun oenamudarieseo
- MR: Sarangŭn oenamudariesŏ
- Genre: Romantic comedy
- Written by: Lim Hye-jin
- Directed by: Park Jun-hwa
- Starring: Ju Ji-hoon; Jung Yu-mi; Lee Si-woo; Kim Ye-won
- Music by: Ha Geun-young
- Country of origin: South Korea
- Original language: Korean
- No. of episodes: 12

Production
- Producers: Chang Shin-ae; Kim Dae-ho; Heo Jae-moo
- Running time: 70 minutes
- Production companies: Studio Dragon; Blitzway Studio

Original release
- Network: tvN
- Release: November 23 – December 29, 2024

Love Your Enemy (Korean: 사랑은 외나무다리에서) is a 2024 South Korean romantic comedy television series written by Lim Hye-jin, directed by Park Jun-hwa, and starring Ju Ji-hoon and Jung Yu-mi. The series follows a passionate love story between a man and a woman who have same name, face painful separation due to family feuds and fateful twists. It aired on tvN from November 23 to December 29, 2024, every Saturday and Sunday at 21:20 (KST). It is also available for streaming on Viki and Disney+ in selected regions.

== Synopsis ==
Seok Ji-won and Yoon Ji-won are two individuals who were born on the same day, share the same name, and come from families that have been enemies for generations. Their lives have been intertwined since birth, but their relationship has been defined by rivalry rather than affection. After high school, they drift apart and unexpectedly reunite 18 years later at their alma mater. Seok Ji-won returns as the school's new chairman while Yoon Ji-won works there as a physical education teacher. Their long-standing animosity resurfaces, forcing them to confront old resentments, unresolved emotions, and the complicated legacy of their shared past, even as sparks of attraction begin to reemerge.

== Cast and characters ==
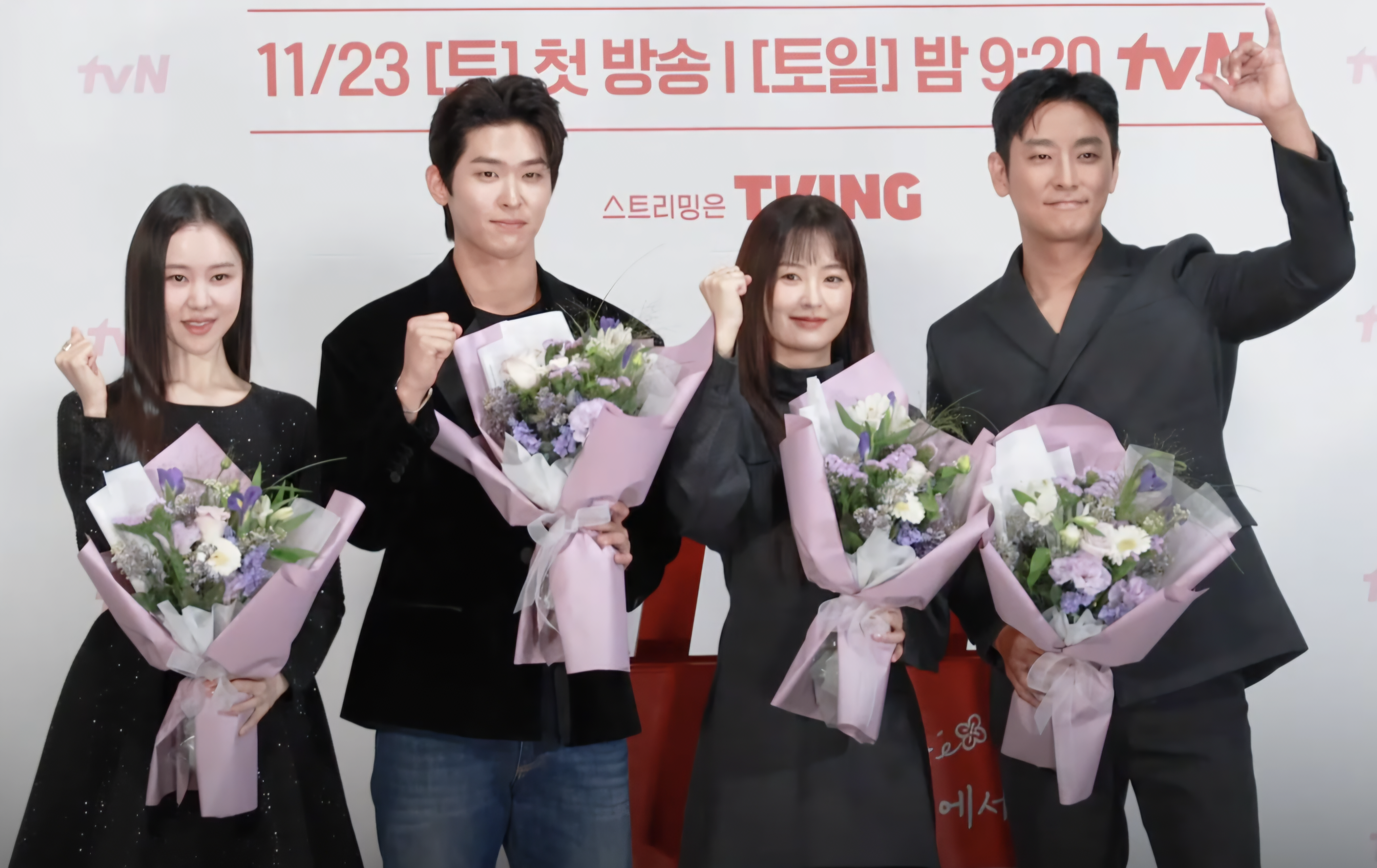
The main cast of Love Your Enemy at the press conference in November 2024

=== Main ===
- Ju Ji-hoon as Seok Ji-won
  - Hong Min-gi as young Seok Ji-won

Executive Director of Seokban Construction and the new chairman of Dokmok High School. He left his hometown and school due to family circumstances, but returned to his hometown as the chairman of the foundation, and met Yoon Ji-won again who is his great rival.

- Jung Yu-mi as Yoon Ji-won
  - Oh Ye-ju as young Yoon Ji-won

Physical education teacher and member of Creative Experience department at Dokmok High School. Ji-woon was nicknamed "Dokmok High School Crazy Dog" when she was a student, which awakened after she reunited with Seok Ji-won.

- Lee Si-woo as Gong Moon-soo

A former national star and high school swimmer and current physical education teacher intern. He is called a weirdo due to his bright and innocent personality and receives intensive management from Yoon Ji-won.

- Kim Ye-won as Cha Ji-hye

Math teacher and member of College Admission Department at Dokmok High School, who is also a childhood friend of Yoon Ji-won and Seok Ji-won. She grew up watching them fight daily, but has a secret that she cannot tell.

- Kim Kap-soo as Yoon Jae-ho

Yoon Ji-won's grandfather and former chairman of Dokmok High School.

=== Supporting ===
==== Seok Ji-won's family ====
- Lee Byung Joon as Seok Kyung-tae

Seok Ji-won's father who runs a prominent construction company and prepares to enter politics, but his resentment deepens as his business becomes difficult due to Yoon's family.

- Kim Jung-young as Han Young-eun

Seok Ji-won's mother who has money and fame but thinks life is boring, hoping that her son can bring in a good daughter-in-law.

- Kim Hye-ok as Ahn Su-ja

Seok Kyung-tae's mother and Seok Ji-won's grandmother.

==== Teachers of Dokmok High School ====
- Jo Jae Yoon as Ji Kyung-hoon

Director at Dokmok High School Administration Office.

- Jeon Hae-jin as Maeng Soo-ah

Math teacher and member of Creative Experience Department at Dokmok High School, and Yoon Ji-won's best friend. She seems like an unstoppable individual who falls in love easily, seeks a passionate relationship, and breaks up quickly – but is deeply concerned and cherishes her best friend.

- Kim Jae-chul as Hong Tae-oh

School doctor and member of Creative Experience Department at Dokmok High School, and has a warm yet calm personality. He takes great care of his students and fellow teachers and considers himself a strong supporter at school.

- Yun Seo-hyun as Byun Deok-soo

Korean-language teacher and head of College Admission Department at Deokmok High School.

- Kim Hee-chang as Lee Jae-gyu

Chemistry teacher and head of Creative Experience Department at Deokmok High School.

- Baek Hyun-joo as Kang Young-jae

Vice-principal at Dokmok High School who is aiming for the principal's position.

- Yi Seo as Jang On-yu

Korean-language teacher and member of College Admission Department.

==== Students in Yoon Ji-won's class ====
- Choi Yoon-ji as Go Hae-soo

Class president of class 2–1

- Jo Beom-gyu as Eom Ki-seok

An all-rounder student who is good at everything except studying.

- Ji Ga-eun as Kim Yu-mi

Hae-soo's best friend.

- Song Ga-yeon as Jung-yul

A student who transfers into Yoon Ji-won's class.

=== Others ===
- Kim Hyun-mok as Lee Ki-ha

Seok Ji-won's secretary.

- Yoon Jae-chan as Yoo Hong-jae

Yoon Ji-won and Seok Ji-won's childhood friend who is close to the latter. He is the most leadership and cheerful person among his peers.

=== Special appearances ===
- Lee Seung Joon as Park Dong-jin

Managing Director of Seokban Construction, who views Seok Ji-won as a thorn in his side.

- Im Chul-soo as adult Yoo Hong-jae

- Bae Hyun-sung as young Yoon Jae-ho

- Moon Sang-min as young Seok Ban-hee

- Park Yoon-ho as Kim Dong-woon

He is one year behind Yoon Ji-won and Seok Ji-won in high school.

== Production ==
=== Development ===
Love Your Enemy was developed under the working title Love on a Single Log Bridge, produced by Studio Dragon and Blitzway Studio, helmed by Park Jun-hwa, and penned by Lim Hye-jin.

On April 26, 2024, it was reported that the first script-reading had ended.

=== Casting ===
Ju Ji-hoon and Jung Yu-mi were reportedly cast to appear as lead actors for the series in January and February 2024, respectively. Lee Si-woo was reportedly cast as another lead in June 2024.

Ju and Jung were confirmed to star in the series in August 2024.

=== Filming ===
Principal photography began in May 2024.

== Release ==
According to News Tomato report, tvN officials stated that Love Your Enemy was set to air on their channel in December 2024. tvN announced that the series will be broadcast on November 23 instead. It is also available to stream on Viki and Disney+ in selected regions.

== Viewership ==
Love Your Enemy : South Korea viewers per episode (thousands)

Season	Episode number												Average
Season	1	2	3	4	5	6	7	8	9	10	11	12	Average
1	766	1423	781	1238	1047	1330	1261	1375	1041	1176	976	1481	1158

Source: Audience measurement performed nationwide by Nielsen Korea.

Average TV viewership ratings
Ep.	Original broadcast date	Average audience share (Nielsen Korea)	
Ep.	Original broadcast date	Nationwide	Seoul
1	November 23, 2024	3.488% (1st)	4.006% (1st)
2	November 24, 2024	6.453% (1st)	7.117% (1st)
3	November 30, 2024	3.332% (1st)	3.602% (1st)
4	December 1, 2024	5.438% (1st)	5.177% (1st)
5	December 7, 2024	5.048% (1st)	5.600% (1st)
6	December 8, 2024	5.543% (1st)	5.845% (1st)
7	December 14, 2024	5.130% (1st)	5.099% (1st)
8	December 15, 2024	5.655% (1st)	5.940% (1st)
9	December 21, 2024	4.279% (1st)	3.925% (1st)
10	December 22, 2024	4.672% (1st)	4.566% (1st)
11	December 28, 2024	3.948% (1st)	3.801% (1st)
12	December 29, 2024	6.472% (1st)	6.326% (1st)
Average		4.955%	5.084%
In the table above, the blue numbers represent the lowest ratings and the red numbers represent the highest ratings.; This drama airs on a cable channel/pay TV which normally has a relatively smaller audience compared to free-to-air TV/public broadcasters (KBS, SBS, MBC, and EBS).
