= Lee Si-woo (actor) =

South Korean actor (born 1999)

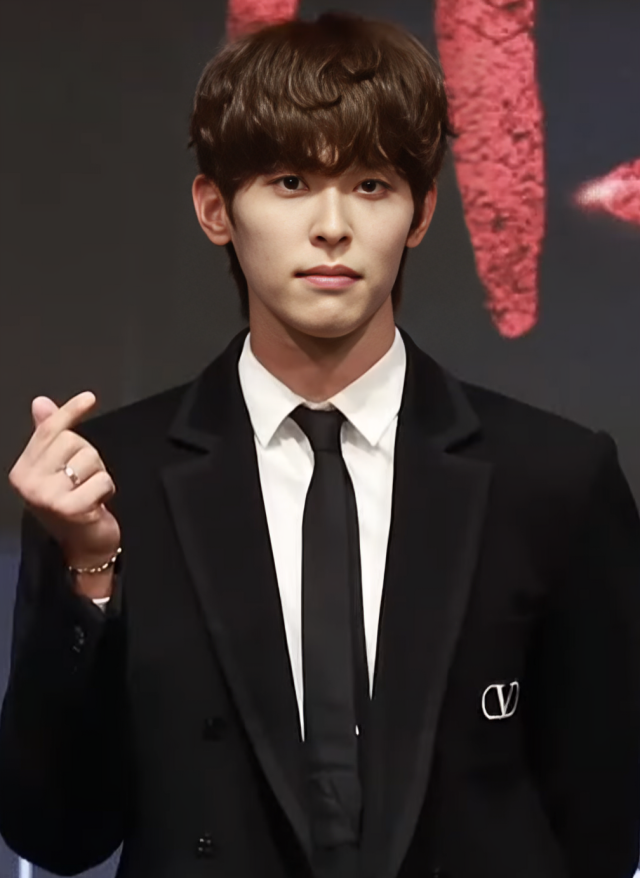
- Lee in August 2024
- Born: December 19, 1999 (age 26); South Korea
- Other name: Lee Chan-sun
- Education: Korea National University of Arts – Drama Center and Acting Department
- Occupation: Actor
- Years active: 2013–present
- Agent: Npio

Korean name
- Hangul: 이시우
- RR: I Siu
- MR: I Siu

Lee Si-woo (Korean: 이시우; born December 19, 1999) is a South Korean actor.

== Discography ==
=== Soundtrack appearances ===
List of soundtrack appearances, showing year released and album name
| Title | Year | Album |
|---|---|---|
| "Take off" (feat. SAya) | 2024 | Love Your Enemy OST Part 8 |

== Filmography ==
=== Television series ===
| Year | Title | Role | Notes | Ref. |
|---|---|---|---|---|
| 2013 | Nine | Young-soo | | |
| 2020 | Hi Bye, Mama! | Jang Pil-seung | | |
| 2020 | Do Do Sol Sol La La Sol | Kim Ji-hoon | | |
| 2021 | Here's My Plan | Jun-sik | | |
| 2022 | Drama Special – Stain | Jang Yeon-joon | One-act drama | |
| 2023 | Pale Moon | Yoon Min-jae | | |
| 2023 | See You in My 19th Life | Ha Do-jin | | |
| 2024 | Perfect Family | Ji Hyun-woo | | |
| 2024 | Love Your Enemy | Gong Moon-soo | | |
| 2025 | Love Me | Seo Jun-seo | | |

=== Web series ===
| Year | Title | Role | Ref. |
|---|---|---|---|
| 2017–2018 | Sweet Revenge | Go-he's ex-boyfriend | |
| 2023 | Boyhood | Jeong Gyeong-tae | |

=== Music video appearances ===
| Year | Song Title | Artist | Ref. |
|---|---|---|---|
| 2022 | "Lovesick" (아픈 나를) | Sung Si-kyung | |

== Awards and nominations ==
Name of the award ceremony, year presented, category, nominee of the award, and the result of the nomination
| Award ceremony | Year | Category | Nominee / Work | Result | Ref. |
|---|---|---|---|---|---|
| Baeksang Arts Awards | 2024 | Best New Actor – Television | Boyhood | Nominated | |
| Blue Dragon Series Awards | 2024 | Best New Actor | Boyhood | Nominated | |
| Korea Drama Awards | 2024 | Best New Actor | Boyhood | Won | |
