= The Role of a Lifetime =

2025 Australian parenting TV series

- Genre: Factual
- Starring: Kate Ritchie; Nazeem Hussain; Heather Mitchell; Amanda Keller; Maggie Dent
- Country of origin: Australia
- Original language: English

Original release
- Network: ABC TV
- Release: 18 February 2025 – present

The Role of a Lifetime is an Australian television parenting series for ABC TV which released on 18 February 2025. Produced by Debbie Cuell, the series focuses on sketch comedy mixed with factual and scripted television. It is hosted by Amanda Keller, and centres on parenting in an ever changing world for teens.

== Plot ==
The series consists of scripted comedy sketches exploring the challenges of parenting in modern Australia. The hosts then explore the issues discussed in the sketches alongside real-world experts.

== Cast ==
- Amanda Keller - Host
- Maggie Dent - Host / Parenting expert
- Kate Ritchie as Mum
- Nazeem Hussain as Dad
- Heather Mitchell as Nan
- Holly Austin as Jen
- Nina Oyama as Dr. Jesse
- Kaspar Frost as Jack
- Kira McLennan as Abbie

== Production ==
On 18 July 2024, ABC announced the series, with Screen Australia and Screen NSW providing funding for the series.

== Episodes ==
Episode	Date	Viewers	Ref
Episode 1	18 February 2025	321,000	
Episode 2	25 February 2025	237,000	
Episode 3	4 March 2025	245,000	
Episode 4	11 March 2025	268,000	
Episode 5	18 March 2025	210,000	
