= Penelope Stewart =

- Born: Montreal, Quebec
- Website: penelopestewart.ca

Penelope Stewart is a Toronto-based multi-disciplinary artist whose work encompasses installation, sculpture, photography and paper-based projects.

== Biography ==
Stewart was born in Montreal. She obtained a Bachelor of Fine Arts from York University, Toronto and a Master of Fine Arts from the State University of New York at Buffalo.

== Artistic career ==
Stewart is known for her installation work that often examines themes such as architecture, volume and space.

In February 2013, Stewart was the Artist in Residence at Ganna Walska Lotusland in Montecito, California. While there, her exhibition Swarm showcased architectural wall coverings made entirely from bees wax. She used the medium once more in 2014's Vanitas.

== Major exhibits ==
- Canopy, Stride Gallery, Calgary, Alberta - January 14 to February 12, 2005 Ou
- Outside the Walls, Musée d'art de Joliette, Joliette, Quebec - July 4, 2009 to August 2, 2009
- Vanitas, Koffler Galleries, Toronto, Ontario - June 26 to August 31, 2014
