= Andrew Tighe =

Australian actor and theatre director (born 1955)

- Born: 23 November 1955 (age 70); Sydney, Australia
- Education: Newington College
- Occupations: Actor, Director
- Years active: 1980 to present

Andrew Phillip Tighe (born 23 November 1955) is an Australian actor and theatre director.

== Early life ==
Tighe was born in Sydney and educated at Newington College. Commencing in Year 3 at Lindfield Preparatory School in 1964, he completed the HSC in 1973. At the University of Sydney he was a member of SUDS.

== Acting career ==
In 1980, Tighe made his professional acting debut with the Sydney Theatre Company in The Sunny South. Later that year he played the part of the painfully shy schoolboy, Matthew, in The STC's production of Close of Play. He has since performed for many major theatre companies in Australia.

In 1990, he joined the cast of the stage production of The Importance of Being Earnest as Algernon Moncrieff. This popular production ran between 1988 and 1992 and was televised by the ABC/; ; ; ; ; ; ; ; ;

Tighe has been a member of the cast of the STC's production of Uncle Vanya which has toured New York City.

Whilst predominantly a stage actor, Tighe has appeared on screen in the following productions: Home and Away; Rogue Nation; All Saints; Grass Roots; Water Rats; Big Sky; G.P.; Hampton Court; Edens Lost; Emma: Queen of the South Seas; and A Country Practice.
