= The Dog Trick =

- Official poster
- Directed by: Christian Eklöw; Christopher Panov
- Written by: Christian Eklöw; Christopher Panov
- Produced by: Lennart Dunér; Peter Kropenin
- Starring: Linus Wahlgren; Alexander Skarsgård; Josephine Bornebusch
- Cinematography: Carl Ljungberg; Robert Nordström
- Edited by: Fredrik Abrahamsen; Christian Eklöw; Christopher Panov
- Music by: Johan Nilsson
- Production company: Omega Film
- Distributed by: Sonet Film
- Release date: 27 October 2002
- Running time: 106 minuter
- Country: Sweden
- Language: Swedish

The Dog Trick (Swedish: Hundtricket – The Movie) is a 2002 Swedish romantic comedy film directed by Christian Eklöw and Christopher Panov. It stars Linus Wahlgren, Alexander Skarsgård and Josephine Bornebusch in the lead roles. Skarsgård received a Guldbagge Award nomination for Best Supporting Actor.

== Cast ==
- Linus Wahlgren as Simon
- Josephine Bornebusch as Mia
- Alexander Skarsgård as Robinson-Micke
- Ivan Nikcevic as Mario
- Kjell Bergqvist as Teacher
