= The Adventures of Gracie Lou =

- Genre: Preschool; Animated series Nursery rhymes
- Created by: Darren and Helen Simpson
- Music by: Erwin Keiles
- Opening theme: Gracie Lou Theme
- Ending theme: Gracie Lou Theme (9-second instrumental as Gracie Lou Credits)
- Countries of origin: United Kingdom; Australia
- Original language: English
- No. of seasons: 1
- No. of episodes: 52

Production
- Executive producers: Darren Simpson; Erwin Keiles; Glenn Keiles; John Thirkell
- Production locations: Perth, Western Australia, Australia (Video animation); London, England, United Kingdom (Audio)
- Animator: Darren Simpson

Original release
- Network: ABC For Kids (Australia)
- Release: 5 March 2007 – January 14, 2018

The Adventures of Gracie Lou is a British-Australian animated series created by Darren and Helen Simpson, owners of Merry Dance Productions. The show premiered in 2007 on ABC Kids.

In 2011, the show aired on the Hungarian version of the channel JimJam. It premiered on October 1, 2009, on Playhouse Disney (now Disney Junior) in the United States. The Adventures of Gracie Lou is set in the colourful, happy, and musical world of three-year-old Gracie Lou and all her friends. They have many fun-filled adventures learning new words, playing exciting games, and learning new songs. In 2008 or 2009, the show was dubbed, premiered, and aired on the Israeli/Hebrew version of the channels Hop! Channel and Luli TV. In 2018, the show was removed from these channels. As of 2026, it is unlikely that this show will eventually return on TV, because its characters will retire by 2028.

== Overall ==
The Adventures of Gracie Lou is set in the colourful, happy, and musical world of three-year-old Gracie Lou and all her friends. They have many fun-filled adventures learning new words, playing exciting games, and learning new songs.

== The Plot ==
The Adventures of Gracie Lou is the brainchild of husband-and-wife team Darren and Helen Simpson, who make up Merry Dance Productions. What started as a simple bedtime story series for their two young daughters, Grace and Matilda, has now become a fully-animated singing and learning series for children aged 0–4 years. It's something of which they are extremely proud and are pleased to introduce it to you.

Whilst this has been an ongoing project for the past 5 years, it wasn't until Darren and Helen joined creative forces with the team at Two Camels Music in London that we saw the final quality children's animation we have today. The musical skills of Erwin Keiles and John Thirkell have turned these traditional children's songs into new modern treasures which children will love and enjoy.

The Adventures of Gracie Lou is appealing to young children because of its simplicity, bright colours, use of creative learning repetition, and simple, non-cluttered movement. Most importantly, it is fun.

The characters are fun and colourful. They are always smiling and dancing their way from one song to the next. New puzzles and games are always around the next corner, and each task is as exciting as the last.

Darren, Helen, and the team at Two Camels Music are committed to producing quality children's stories that help children learn and grow. With each song or story they animate, comes the new challenge of inspiring the growing and learning minds of our children. It's a challenge they meet with great passion and enthusiasm, and one which they hope to transfer into the world of Gracie Lou.

The Adventures of Gracie Lou was once just a dream, but now it is a reality.

== Characters ==
- Gracie Lou - She has orange hair in a flip, wearing a purple long-sleeved dress with a pink heart on it, bright green pants, and black shoes. She is a 3-year-old girl.
- Matilda - She is a young infant with only one piece of hair on the top of her head, wearing an orange long-sleeved dress with a light pink heart on it. She has bright pink underwear because she has started potty training. She is Gracie Lou's 2-year-old baby sister.
- Emily - She is a dark-skinned girl with black hair and five reddish-orange hair bows on each side, wears a green dress with a bright yellow star on it, and has black shoes. She is a 2 1/2-year-old girl.
- Henry - He is a little boy with spiky yellow hair on top, a red T-shirt, blue shorts, and black shoes. He is Gracie Lou's 3 1/2-year-old love interest.
- Granddad - He is an old man who has white hair and a white beard, a brown sweater, grey pants, and big brown boots. He's Gracie Lou's white-haired grandfather.
- Doddie the Friendly Dragon - His appearance is that of a green dragon. He is Gracie Lou’s special friend and only 3 Dragon years old.
- Charlie - He is a bright yellow dog with dark yellow spots, an orange nose, and a purple collar. He is Gracie Lou’s pet puppy dog, who is 3 years old as well.

Alongside the characters, there are also animals such as Gracie Lou, who has a Teddy Bear, and Emily has a bear-like Panda. The others are White Bunny Rabbit, Light Orange Cat, Yellow Duck, White Mice, etc.

There's the only song where the main characters did not appear, in their place, a tribe of Indians appeared, which the episode name is 10 Little Indians.

== Songs ==
1. Head Shoulders Knees and Toes
2. Hickory Dickory Dock
3. Row, Row, Row Your Boat
4. The Wheels on the Bus
5. This is the Way
6. 1, 2, 3, 4, 5
7. Miss Polly
8. Ding Dong Bell
9. I Ride My Little Bicycle
10. I Am the Music Man
11. Horsey Horsey
12. Teddy Bear, Teddy Bear
13. Jack and Jill
14. 10 Green Bottles
15. One, Two, Buckle My Shoe
16. One Man Went To Mow
17. Six Little Ducks
18. 10 Fat Sausages
19. 10 Little Indians
20. Three Blind Mice
21. Mary Had A Little Lamb
22. If You're Happy and You Know It
23. I'm a Little Teapot
24. Ring a Ring Of Roses
25. Round and Round the Garden
26. The Hokey Cokey
27. 2 Little Dickey Birds
28. See Saw Marjorie Daw
29. With My Foot I Tap Tap Tap
30. The Grand Old Duke of York
31. Jelly on a Plate
32. Baa Baa Black Sheep
33. Old MacDonald Had a Farm
34. Wind the Bobbin Up
35. We Went to the Animal Fair
36. Daddy's Taking Us to the Zoo Tomorrow
37. 1 Finger 1 Thumb
38. How Much Is That Doggie?
39. The Farmer's in the Dell
40. Twinkle Twinkle Little Star
41. 10 in the Bed
42. I'm a Kangaroo
43. 5 Little Ducks
44. 5 Little Monkeys
45. Incy Wincy Spider
46. Knick-Knack Paddy-Whack
47. The ABC Song
48. Chugga Chugga, Choo Choo
49. Dancing Girls
50. The Animal Rock
51. Never Smile at a Crocodile
52. Dingle Dangle Scarecrow
53. Jingle Bells (website only)

== Theme song lyrics ==
=== Full version ===
Come and play with Gracie,
We'll have a lot of fun!
Charlie's chasing Henry
In the morning sun.

Sing and dance with Granddad,
Matilda's dancing too!
There's lots to see and do,
So can we come play with you?

Gracie and her pals all
Want to play with you!

=== TV intro version ===
Gracie and her pals all
Want to play with you!

== Pilots ==
Happy Birthday Gracie Lou and Where's Doddie? are the pilot episodes of The Adventures of Gracie Lou.

== Gracie Lou Funtime ==
The series introduces the educational game for children called Gracie Lou Funtime.

Main character: A girl named Gracie Lou drives a red car.

Educational topics: The game focuses on learning different topics through signs that appear along the way:

- Animals
- Food
- Numbers
- Shapes

== Sources ==
- The Adventures of Gracie Lou at JimJam TV (Hungarian)
