= Two Years Later =

- Genre: Comedy drama Romantic comedy
- Written by: Pete Bridges
- Directed by: Emma Freeman; Lucy Gaffy; Paige Rattray
- Starring: Phoebe Tonkin; Brenton Thwaites; Heather Mitchell; Roy Billing
- Composer: Bryony Marks
- Country of origin: Australia
- Original language: English
- No. of seasons: 1
- No. of episodes: 8

Production
- Producers: Tracey Vieira; Tracey Robertson; Nathan Mayfield
- Production company: Hoodlum

Original release
- Network: Paramount+
- Release: 4 June 2026

Two Years Later is an Australian romantic comedy drama television series for Paramount+ that was released on 4 June 2026. Produced by Hoodlum, the series follows Emily and Ryan in a post pandemic world after the world came to a halt, they reconnect after two years in a series of brief encounters and see if they truly love each other.

== Plot ==
When their work commute is interrupted by COVID-19, Emily and Ryan reunite two years later after a series of brief flirtatious interactions. Ryan proposes an idea: to go on a series of eight dates to decide if they are truly right for each other.

== Cast ==
On 22 June 2025, the series was announced with Phoebe Tonkin and Brenton Thwaites named as the leads for the show.

- Phoebe Tonkin as Emily
- Brenton Thwaites as Ryan
- Jada Alberts as Nat
- Joey Vieira as Antonio
- Ron Smyck as Mike
- Heather Mitchell as Lorna
- Roy Billing as Morgan

== Production ==
On 22 June 2025, it was announced that the series had gone into production in Brisbane, Queensland with funding secured from Screen Australia with post production taking place in the Queensland facilities, the eight part drama will air in 2026 on Paramount+. The series was written by Pete Bridges with Emma Freeman directing and Helen O'Loan as Production Designer. Brenton Thwaites and Phoebe Tonkin serving as the series two leads.

Screen Queensland CEO Jacqui Feeney said that the agency was proudly supporting the production with its incentives and said that it was a testament to the industry and what it can achieve.

On 8 February, the series premiered at the AACTA Festival.

On 8 May 2026, the trailer for the series was released and the series would air all eight episodes from 4 June 2026.

== Episodes ==
No.	Title	Directed by	Written by	Original release date
1	"First Date"	Emma Freeman	Pete Bridges	4 June 2026
2	"Second Date"	Emma Freeman	Pete Bridges	4 June 2026
3	"Third Date"	Emma Freeman	Pete Bridges	4 June 2026
4	"Fourth Date"	Lucy Gaffy	Pete Bridges	4 June 2026
5	"Fifth Date"	Paige Rattray	Pete Bridges	4 June 2026
6	"Sixth Date"	Emma Freeman	Pete Bridges	4 June 2026
7	"Seventh Date"	Lucy Gaffy	Pete Bridges	4 June 2026
8	"Eighth Date"	Lucy Gaffy	Pete Bridges	4 June 2026

== Release and Reaction ==
Chelsea Hui a reviewer of Mamamia said that the series felt like an 'Anti-Rom Com' in the middle ground, calling the series 'grounded'.

Anthony Morris of ScreenHub rated the series 4 out of 5 stars saying that the series was full of character, writing that as the episodes continue the series builds up both Emily and Ryan desperate for connection.
