= Josephine Bornebusch =

Swedish actress (born 1981)

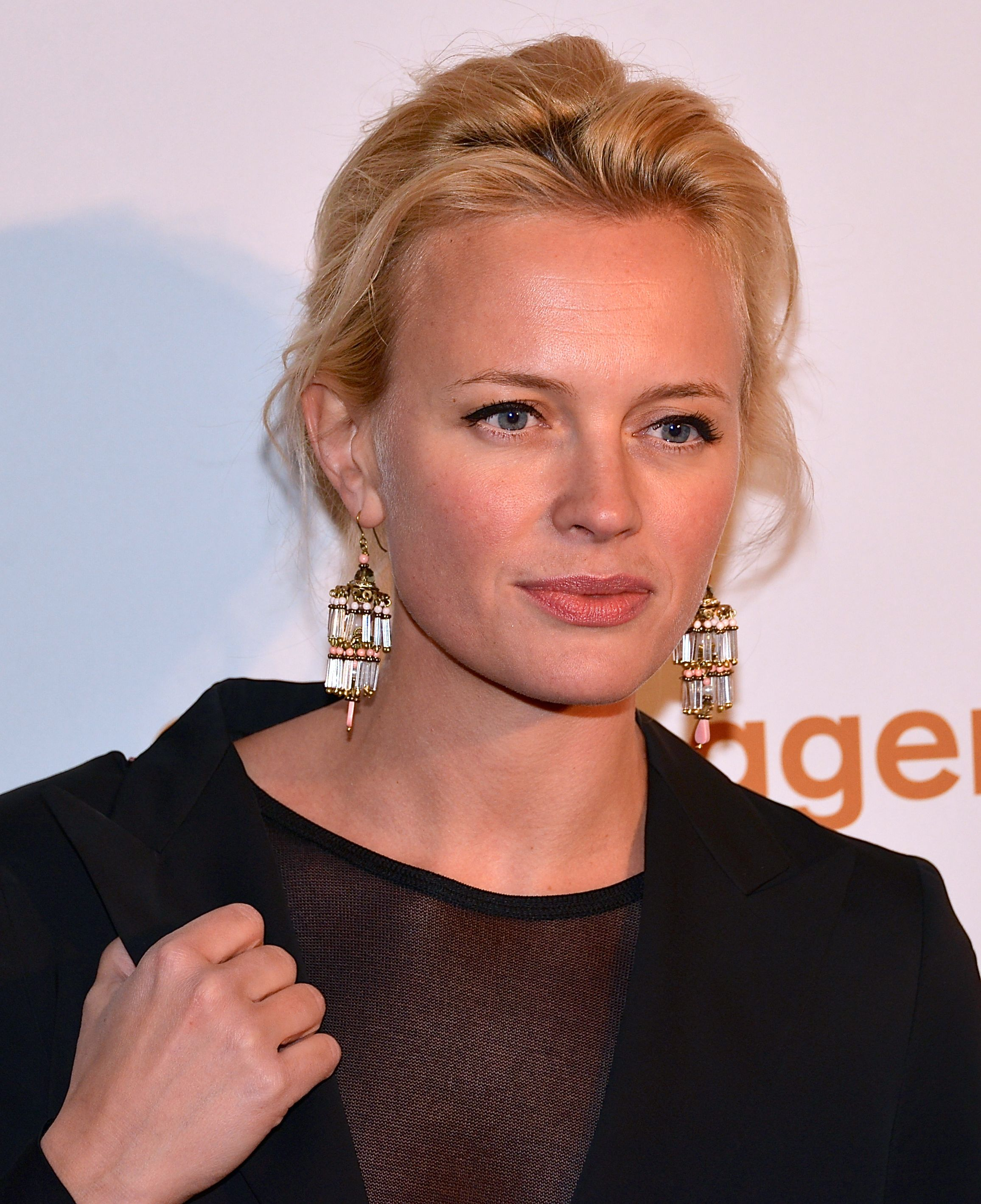
- Bornebusch in 2013
- Born: Leyla Jerrie Josephine Bornebusch; 12 September 1981 (age 43); Stockholm, Sweden
- Occupations: Actress; director
- Children: 2

Leyla Jerrie Josephine Bornebusch (born 12 September 1981) is a Swedish actress and director.

== Early life ==
She was born 12 September 1981.

== Career ==
Bornebusch was involved in Vår teater, a children's theatre, as a child. She began her acting career in the Swedish drama series Rederiet in 1999 and a year later, she starred alongside Alexander Skarsgård in the films White Water Fury and Wings of Glass. In 2002, Bornebusch again acted in a film alongside Skarsgård as one of the lead roles of the film The Dog Trick. She starred in the comedy show Playa del Sol on SVT1. She was also one of the regular hosts of Fredag Hela Veckan, a Swedish version of Saturday Night Live. She starred as the character "Mickan" in the comedy series Solsidan.

Bornebusch is a writer, associate producer, and female lead opposite Greg Poehler in Welcome to Sweden which was broadcast on TV4 in Sweden and on NBC in the United States. The series was cancelled on 28 July 2015.

She made her directorial debut in 2018 with Lasse-Majas detektivbyrå – Det första mysteriet.

Bornebusch wrote and directed the TV series Älska mig in which she also plays the lead role, the series premiered in October 2019, with a second season starting in April 2020. In 2020 she directed Orca, that she co-wrote with Gunnar AK Järvstad. She wrote, directed, and played the leading role in the 2024 Netflix film Släpp taget (English language Let Go).

== Personal life ==
In July 2014, Bornebusch revealed that she was pregnant with her first child. In late August of the same year, she gave birth to a son. In November 2016, her second child, a daughter, was born.

== Filmography ==
=== Television ===
Year	Title	Role	Notes	Ref.
1999	Rederiet	Madeleine Boisse de Blaque	11 episodes	
2000	Hotel Seger	Charlotte Ivarsson		
2007–2009	Playa del Sol	Linn	12 episodes	
2008	Irene Huss	Charlotte von Knecht	1 episode	
2008	Oskyldigt dömd	Annika Schalin	1 episode	
2009	The Inspector and the Sea	Lisa Mattson	Episode: "The Dying Dandy"	
2010	Solsidan	Mikaela "Mickan" Schiller	Main role	
2014–2015	Welcome to Sweden	Emma Wiik	Main role	
2019–2020	Älska mig	Clara	Main role, writer, director	
2022	Bad Sisters	–	Director (episodes 4–6)	
2024	Baby Reindeer	–	Director (episodes 5–7)	

=== Film ===
Year	Title	Role	Notes	Ref.
1983	Moderna människor	The Little Child		
2000	White Water Fury	Susanne		
2000	Wings of Glass	Lotta		
2002	The Dog Trick	Mia		
2008	Kung Fu Panda		Voice, Swedish dub	
2008	Beverly Hills Chihuahua		Voice, Swedish dub	
2008	The Elephant Princess		Voice, Swedish dub	
2009	Kenny Begins	Thug 3		
2009	Scenes from a Celebrity Life	Josephine Bornebusch		
2009	Så olika	Milou		
2013	Love and Lemons	Lussan		
2020	Orca	Matilda		
2024	Släpp taget	Writer, director, and Stella		

== Discography ==
=== Singles ===
- 2011: "I'm So Happy" (Salem Al Fakir feat. Josephine Bornebusch)
