= Max Cullen =

Australian-born stage and screen actor (born 1940)

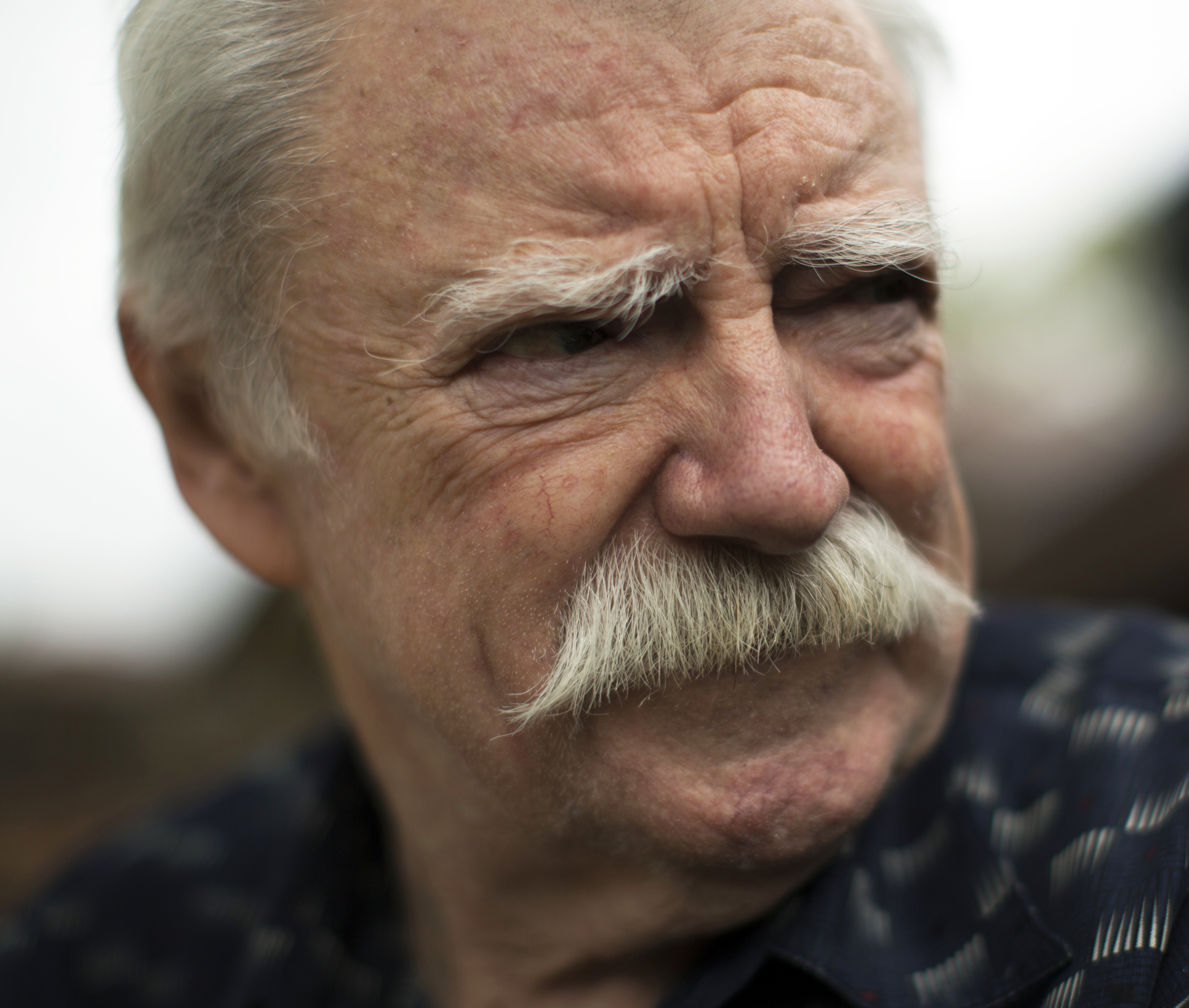
- Cullen in Acute Misfortune
- Born: Maxwell Phillip Cullen; 29 April 1940 (age 86); Wellington, New South Wales, Australia
- Occupation: Actor
- Years active: 1963–present
- Spouse: Colleen Anne Fitzpatrick (1973–1987)
- Children: 2, including Katharine Cullen
- Family: Cul Cullen (brother)

Maxwell Phillip Cullen (born 29 April 1940) is an Australian stage and screen character actor. He has appeared in many Australian films, television series and theatre productions, he is perhaps best known for his role in the film Spider and Rose and the television series The Flying Doctors, Secret Valley and Love My Way.

== Early life ==
Cullen was born on 29 April 1940, in Wellington, New South Wales to Alec Cullen, an electrical linesman and Lila Mary (née Vale). The second of three children, his older brother was Fred Cullen, the actor and screenwriter known professionally as Cul Cullen (1934–1982). When he was a year old, Cullen's family moved to Lawson in the Blue Mountains, after his father contracted tuberculosis and resigned from his job.

Cullen's love of performing began in kindergarten, but he was quiet, shy and dyslexic. He also had a lisp, which one of the nuns at his school helped him overcome. After a short time at Katoomba High School, Cullen attended Westmead Secondary Junior Technical School after the family moved to the western Sydney suburb of Northmead.

Cullen left school at 15 and worked in copy at The Sydney Morning Herald. From there, he worked for the advertising agency Lintas, while attending East Sydney Technical College, before leaving to study at Julian Ashton’s art school. After this time, he worked for the magazines Pix and Woman's Day for five years, before returned to East Sydney Technical College to study sculpture. He simultaneously worked as a freelance artist and illustrator for various magazines.

== Career ==
=== Art ===
Cullen began his career as a painter and sculptor after training at Sydney's National Art School in 1956 and at the Julian Ashton Art School with Brett Whiteley in 1959. His works have been exhibited regularly in solo and in group exhibitions, including the Archibald, Blake and Sulman Prizes. He also worked as an illustrator, cartoonist and layout artist on several magazines and newspapers.

Cullen's portrait of actor Geoffrey Rush later saw him become a finalist for the Archibald Prize in 2000.

=== Acting ===
After seeing a Hayes Gordon-directed play in 1958, Cullen became interested in the acting profession and began attending Gordon's classes at Sydney's Ensemble Theatre in 1963. Gordon invited Cullen to design the set for a production of The Physicists in 1963 and gave him a walk-on part in the play. He went on to work in Ensemble productions over a ten-year period, including playing the Scavenger in The Thracian Horses in 1964 opposite Reg Livermore, before Gordon cast Cullen in his first major role, in a 1965 production of Photo Finish.

In 1968, Cullen's performance as Rocky in prison documentary drama Fortune and Men's Eyes paved the way for a series of villainous screen roles, including playing the son of Mafia man Mario Costello in a 1970 episode of crime series The Link Men. That same year, he was offered a role in the film Ned Kelly alongside Mick Jagger, but opted instead to take a role in the sitcom Mrs. Finnegan, in which he played the comic role of the dim-witted Hilton Harper.

Cullen then landed a regular role in World War 2 series Spyforce, playing the role of Barrow from 1971. The following year, Cullen began playing the recurring role of Ralph Finlayson in soap opera Number 96. He also played an Irishman in the film The Office Picnic, contributing his own lines to the script.

Cullen also worked at the newly established Nimrod Theatre, appearing in three of Jim McNeil’s plays, The Chocolate Frog and The Old Familiar Juice, both in 1973, and How Does Your Garden Grow in 1974, with the latter directed by John Bell. He then appeared in the world premiere of Robert Merritt’s The Cake Man for the National Black Theatre in 1975.

Cullen landed his first major film role in 1975 film Sunday Too Far Away, in which he played a shearing contractor. After seeing him in the film, playwright Patrick White suggested him for the role of Ernie Boyle in a 1976 production of The Season at Sarsaparilla, for the Old Tote Theatre Company. That same year, Cullen played the comic role of a deranged man in an episode of Matlock Police – a part written specifically for him. Patrick White also wrote a role specifically for Cullen in his 1977 play Big Toys.

Cullen continued to appear in feature films, including 1977 thriller Summerfield, 1978 TV movie Cass and 1979 period drama My Brilliant Career, playing the role of Mr McSwatt in the latter. In 1980, he began playing Claude Cribbins in children's series Secret Valley, alongside Hugh Keays-Byrne. The following year, he played criminal Buster in 1981 feature film Hoodwink – a character based on an actual crime figure who faked blindness in prison. He then landed a part in 1983 ABC miniseries Scales of Justice and appeared in the films Outbreak of Hostilities With Prejudice. and Midnite Spares. The following year, his performance in miniseries The Last Bastion earned him a Logie Award for Best Supporting Actor.

Playwright David Williamson wrote the character Kevin Cassidy in his 1985 play Sons of Cain specifically for Cullen – a role Cullen considers one of his career best. He travelled to London with the show where he was nominated for the Sir Laurence Olivier Award for Best Actor for his performance.

The following year, Cullen began playing the main role of Horace 'Hurtle' Morrison in drama series The Flying Doctors, which saw him win a 1986 Penguin Award for Best Performance by an Actor. In 1987, Cullen portrayed Mike, opposite John Bell, Robyn Nevin and Ruth Cracknell in Williamson's play Emerald City which premiered at the Sydney Opera House. This role too, was written specifically for him. That year, he also had a role in three-part historical series Frontier, which chronicled the development of European policy towards Australian Aborigines.

Cullen continued his film appearances with sci-fi film Incident at Raven's Gate. and Boundaries of the Heart with Wendy Hughes, both in 1988. He then appeared in 1989 two-part miniseries Grim Pickings – an Agatha Christie-style whodunit based on the novel by Jennifer Rowe. He also reunited with Wendy Hughes in black comedy film Luigi’s Ladies, and portrayed Will Lusty in Patrick White's play The Ham Funeral, for Sydney Theatre Company. The following year, he won the Sydney Theatre Critics Award for Best Supporting Actor in a production of Shakespeare's The Tempest.

Cullen had several film roles in 1992, including Mad Bomber in Love, Greenkeeping, and Garbo. He also appeared in 1993 film Shotgun Wedding with Aden Young.

Cullen then starred opposite Ruth Cracknell as Jack in 1994 comedy film Spider and Rose, which saw him win both the Australian Film Institute Award and the Film Critics Circle Award for Best Supporting Actor for his performance He also appeared with Paul Hogan and Cuba Gooding jr in comedy adventure Lightning Jack. The following year, he starred in the film Billy's Holiday, as title character Billy Apple, a jazz singer, who longs to sing like his idol Billie Holiday. While it showcased his musical talent, Cullen believes that the film damaged his career.

Cullen took on the main role of Willy Loman in a 1997 production of Death of a Salesman, to critical acclaim. The following year, he featured in a stage adaptation of Tim Winton's novel Cloudstreet in 1998, his performance earning him a Green Room Award for Best Male Actor in a Featured Role. He also played opposite Stephen Dillane and Essie Davis in drama miniseries Kings in Grass Castles, about the life of an Irish immigrant family in Australia in the second half of the 19th century. He then appeared with Rufus Sewell in 1999 film In a Savage Land.

In 2000, Cullen delivered another critically-acclaimed performance in a stage production of Small Poppies, performing opposite Geoffrey Rush for Sydney's Belvoir.

Cullen appeared opposite Eric Bana and Stephen Curry in 2002 comedy film The Nugget. In 2003, he portrayed both Alf in a Sydney Theatre Company production of The One Day of the Year, and humorist Lennie Lower in Looking Up Lower at Sydney's Darlinghurst Theatre, Sydney.

In 2004, Cullen began playing the regular role of Charlie and Tom's father, Gerry, who struggles to have a relationship with his sons, in Foxtel drama series Love My Way. His portrayal earned him an Australian Film Institute Television Award in 2005 for Best Actor in a Supporting or Guest Role in a Television Drama or Comedy. He went on to appear in 2006 Australian drama film Jindabyne, opposite Gabriel Byrne and Laura Linney. Cullen then began performing Lawson: Demons and Dreams, a one-man show based on the life of Australian poet Henry Lawson in 2007.

Cullen appeared opposite Daniel Radcliffe in December Boys in 2007, also narrating the film. He then had a small role in 2008 Baz Luhrmann film Australia, alongside Nicole Kidman and Hugh Jackman, before reuniting with Jackman in 2009 American superhero film X-Men Origins: Wolverine. The following year, he portrayed Henry Lawson again in Faces in the Street: A Salute to Henry Lawson at The Street Theatre, Canberra and toured nationally with Bell Shakespeare as Feste in Twelfth Night.

In 2013, he also wrote and performed the one-man stage show How to Be (Or Not to Be) Lower, portraying Lennie Lower once more. The same week the show premiered, Baz Luhrmann's film adaptation of the The Great Gatsby opened in Australia, with Cullen playing the role of 'Owl Eyes', opposite Leonardo DiCaprio.

In 2015, Cullen reunited with Geoffrey Rush, in a stage production of King Lear, playing Gloucester to Rush's Lear. He also played Henry Lawson again in his show Dead Men Talking: A Two-Man Show of Verse, Yarns & Song in 2015, touring New South Wales and Victoria. He continued touring the show through to 2020.

In 2018 drama film Acute Misfortune, Cullen appeared as his own cousin, Kevin Cullen, father of the main character, real life artist Adam Cullen. The film was an adaptation of award-winning biography Acute Misfortune: The Life and Death of Adam Cullen by Erik Jensen. that same year he appeared opposite Damon Herriman in docudrama film Riot, about Australia's 1970s Gay and Lesbian Rights Movement. He then played a Hank in 2020 film Never Too Late, opposite James Cromwell and Jacki Weaver.

Cullen's other television credits include Skippy, Division 4, Homicide, Kingswood Country, A Country Practice, Police Rescue, McLeod's Daughters and All Saints. He was also a regular arts reporter on Channel 9 current affairs series Sunday.

Cullen has also written, directed and produced several short films and short stories. Additionally, he has worked as a professional and motivational speaker.

== Personal life ==
Cullen been married three times and has two daughters, one from each of his first two marriages. Married to actress Colleen Fitzpatrick from 1973 to 1987, they have one daughter, actress Katharine Cullen, born 9 June 1975, and one grandson William, born 17 August 2013.

In 2003, Cullen and his wife, Margarita Georgiadis, who is a painter, sculptor and designer relocated from Sydney to Gunning, a village in the Southern Tablelands, moving info the heritage Coronation Theatre, that they transformed into The Picture House Gallery and Bookshop, where they sell their work. They were still there in 2020.

A portrait of Cullen, by his cousin, the artist Adam Cullen, was runner-up in the 1999 Archibald Prize. His cousin said: "I painted him the way he is: complicated, opaque, enigmatic and off-centre."

== Filmography ==
=== Film ===
Year	Title	Role	Type	Ref
1966	Nightwait	Milkbar customer		
1969	You Can't See 'round Corners	Peeper	Feature film	
1971	Stockade	Raffaello Carboni	Feature film	
1972	The Office Picnic	Paddy	Feature film	
1975	Sunday Too Far Away	Tim King	Feature film	
1977	Summerfield	Jim Tate	Feature film	
1978	Blue Fin	Pensioner	Feature film	
1979	The Odd Angry Shot	Warrant Officer (uncredited)	Feature film	
1979	My Brilliant Career	Mr. McSwatt	Feature film	
1979	Dimboola	Mutton	Feature film	
1980	Hard Knocks	Newman	Feature film	
1981	Hoodwink	Factory clerk	Feature film	
1982	Starstruck	Reg	Feature film	
1982	Running on Empty (aka Fast Lane Fever)	Rebel	Feature film	
1982	Freedom	Factory clerk	Feature film	
1983	Midnite Spares	Tomas	Feature film	
1983	With Prejudice	Krawczyk	Feature film	
1983	The Return of Captain Invincible	Italian Man	Feature film	
1983	Outbreak of Hostilities	Harry Starling	Feature film	
1984	Stanley: Every Home Should Have One	Berger	Feature film	
1986	Norm and Ahmed	Norm	Short film	
1988	Incident at Raven's Gate	Taylor	Feature film	
1988	Boundaries of the Heart	Blanco White	Feature film	
1989	Luigi's Ladies	Chef	Feature film	
1990	Call Me Mr. Brown	Fibreglass Factory Foreman	Feature film	
1990	The Returning	Father Donohue	Feature film	
1991	As Happy as Larry	Bert	Short film	
1992	Garbo	Wal	Feature film	
1992	Mad Bomber in Love	Sergeant Meggs	Feature film	
1992	Greenkeeping	Tom	Feature film	
1993	Shotgun Wedding	Rev. Arthur Hickey	Feature film	
1994	Lightning Jack	Bart	Feature film	
1994	Spider and Rose	Jack	Feature film	
1995	Rough Diamonds	Magistrate Roy	Feature film	
1995	Billy's Holiday	Billy Apples	Feature film	
1997	Kiss or Kill	Stan	Feature film	
1999	In a Savage Land	Douglas Stevens	Feature film	
2002	The Nugget	Wally	Feature film	
2006	Jindabyne	Terry	Feature film	
2007	December Boys	Narrator / Adult Misty	Feature film	
2008	Australia	Old Drunk	Feature film	
2009	X-Men Origins: Wolverine	Travis Hudson	Feature film	
2009	Possession(s)	Paul	Feature film	
2010	Anyone You Want	Glen	Feature film	
2010	Santa's Apprentice	Humphrey (voice)	Animated feature film (English version)	
2013	The Great Gatsby	Owl Eyes	Feature film	
2016	Broke	Cec	Feature film	
2016	Goldstone	Old Timer	Feature film	
2018	Acute Misfortune	Kevin Cullen	Feature film	
2020	Never Too Late	Hank	Feature film	
2020	The Skin of Others	Henry Lawson	Documentary film	

=== Television ===
Year	Title	Role	Type	Ref
1966–1976	Homicide	8 roles	8 episodes	
1967	Contrabandits	Allen	1 episode	
1968	Skippy	Keeler	1 episode	
1969	Riptide	Gus / Chris / Rod	3 episodes	
1969	Woobinda, Animal Doctor	Johnno	1 episode	
1969–1972	Division 4	Joe Kennedy / John Brody / Tom Shaw	3 episodes	
1970	The Link Men	Mario Costello	1 episode	
1970–1971	Mrs. Finnegan	Hilton Harper	13 episodes	
1971	Dead Men Running		Miniseries, 1 episode	
1971	The Comedy Game		1 episode	
1971–1973	Spyforce	Barrow / Osgood	27 episodes	
1972	Birds in the Bush	The Miner	1 episode	
1972	Boney	Glen Shannon	1 episode	
1972	Number 96	Ralph Finlayson	11 episodes	
1973	Over There		1 episode	
1973	The Evil Touch	Policeman	1 episode	
1973–1976	Matlock Police	The Mouth / Taylor / Brian Young	3 episodes	
1974	Silent Number	Cohen	1 episode	
1974	The Hotline		TV movie	
1975	The Unisexers			
1975	Scattergood: Friend of All	Scattergood	5 episodes	
1975	Shannon's Mob	Vossif	1 episode	
1976	Rush	Billy Adams	1 episode	
1976	McCloud	Putney	1 episode	
1976	Luke's Kingdom	Tom Shipton	Miniseries, 1 episode	
1976	Bluey	Walter Curran	1 episode	
1978	Young Ramsay	Alec Thompson	1 episode	
1978	Chopper Squad	Harry	1 episode	
1978	Bit Part		TV movie	
1978	Cass	Terry, the cameraman	TV movie	
1979	TV Follies	Cheesy Parmesi / Cyrus P Sanders		
1979	Big Toys		TV movie	
1980	Kingswood Country	Donger Jackson	1 episode	
1980	Australian Theatre Festival	Terry	1 episode	
1980	Trial By Marriage		1 episode	
1980	The Timeless Land	Byrne	Miniseries, 3 episodes	
1980–1983	Secret Valley	Claude Cribbins	15 episodes	
1981	Tickled Pink		1 episode	
1981	Cornflakes for Tea	Stan	Miniseries, 6 episodes	
1981	Sunday	Arts reporter		
1983	Kings			
1983	Scales of Justice	Roach	Miniseries, 1 episode	
1983	A Country Practice	Arnold Mortimer	2 episodes	
1984	The Last Bastion	Eddie Ward	Miniseries, 3 episodes	
1984	The Cowra Breakout	Private Hook	Miniseries	
1984	Carson's Law	Wally Oates	2 episodes	
1984	Bodyline	Journalist	Miniseries, 2 episodes	
1985	Possession	Harry Keane		
1985	The Flying Doctors	Horace 'Hurtle' Morrison	Miniseries, 3 episodes	
1986	Charley's Web	Charley O'Keefe	TV movie	
1986–1987	The Flying Doctors	Horace 'Hurtle' Morrison	22 episodes	
1987	Vietnam	Journalist	Miniseries, 1 episode	
1987	Frontier	Captain William Clark	3 episodes	
1987	Rafferty's Rules	Mr Lee	1 episode	
1988	Act of Betrayal	Quinn	Miniseries, 2 episodes	
1989	Grim Pickings	Inspector Toby	Miiniseries, 2 episodes	
1990	Kingswood Country	Donger Jackson		
1991	Police Rescue	Ernie Kemp	1 episode	
1992	Boys from the Bush	Ted	1 episode	
1992; 1995	G.P.	Basil Meagher / Eric Mackie	2 episodes	
1994	The Damnation of Harvey McHugh	Prime Minister Jim Hammond	1 episode	
1995–2012	RPA	Narrator		
1998	Kings in Grass Castles	Mr Costello	Miniseries, 2 episodes	
2001	McLeod's Daughters	Sid Connolly	1 episode	
2004–2007	Love My Way	Gerry Jackson	26 episodes	
2004; 2009	All Saints	Moses / Barney Fawcett	4 episodes	
2005	BlackJack: In the Money		TV movie	
2009	City Homicide	Ray Stairmont	1 episode	
2014	Rake	Judge Coote	1 episode	
2014	Old School	Des	Miniseries, 1 episode	
2014	Devil's Playground	Father Joyce	Miniseries, 3 episodes	
2016	Secret City	Les Gordon		
2016	Doctor Doctor	Martin	1 episode	
2018	Riot	Gerry Gowland	TV movie	
2022	Faraway Downs	Old Drunk	Miniseries, 6 episodes	

=== As crew ===
Year	Title	Role	Type
1976	Rate of Exchange	Writer	Short film

== Stage ==
=== As actor ===
Year	Title	Role	Type	Ref
1963	The Physicists		Ensemble Theatre, Sydney	
1964	The Thracian Horses	Scavenger	Ensemble Theatre, Sydney	
1964	The Rehearsal		Ensemble Theatre, Sydney	
1965	Photo Finish		Ensemble Theatre, Sydney	
1966	The Death of Bessie Smith		Ensemble Theatre, Sydney	
1966	The Shadow of a Gunman		Ensemble Theatre, Sydney	
1967	Double Talk		Ensemble Theatre, Sydney	
1967	Slow Dance on the Killing Ground		Ensemble Theatre, Sydney	
1967	Sarah and the Bible		Ensemble Theatre, Sydney	
1967	The Dirty Old Man		Ensemble Theatre, Sydney	
1967	All Things Bright and Beautiful		Ensemble Theatre, Sydney	
1967–1968	Generation		Ensemble Theatre, Sydney	
1968	A Singular Man		Ensemble Theatre, Sydney	
1968–1969	Fortune and Men's Eyes		Anzac House Auditorium, Sydney with Ensemble Theatre	
1970	We Bombed in New Haven		Monash University, Melbourne, Playhouse, Canberra with Ensemble Theatre	
1970	Face of a Man		Majestic Cinemas, Sydney	
1970	Skippy Saves Christmas		Phillip St Theatre, Sydney	
1971	Stockade		Independent Theatre, Sydney	
1971	Brer Rabbit		UNSW, Sydney with Old Tote Theatre Co	
1972	On Yer Marx: Bigotry V.C.		Nimrod Theatre Co, Sydney	
1972	On Yer Marx: Housey		Nimrod Theatre Co, Sydney	
1972	The Last Supper Show		Nimrod Theatre Co, Sydney	
1973	Prison 73: The Chocolate Frog		Nimrod Theatre Co, Sydney	
1973	Prison 73: The Old Familiar Juice		Nimrod Theatre Co, Sydney	
1973	President Wilson in Paris		Nimrod Theatre Co, Sydney	
1973	Hamlet		Pram Factory, Melbourne, Playhouse, Canberra with Nimrod Theatre Co	
1974	How Does Your Garden Grow?			
1975	The Good Doctor		Playhouse, Canberra, Monash University, Melbourne with Ensemble Theatre	
1975	Sunday Too Far Away	Tim King	Festival Theatre, Adelaide	
1975; 1977	The Cake Man	Civilian	Black Theatre Arts & Culture Centre, Sydney, Bondi Pavilion, Sydney	
1976	Going Home	Jim	St Martins Theatre, Melbourne with Nimrod Theatre Co	
1976	Martello Towers		St Martins Theatre, Melbourne	
1976	The Recruiting Officer	Sergeant Kite	Nimrod Theatre Co, Sydney	
1976	The Season at Sarsaparilla	Ernie Boyle	Sydney Opera House	
1977	Dream Girl	Herbert / Announcer / Mr Homes	Bondi Pavilion, Sydney with Currency Press	
1977	The Propitious Kidnapping of the Cultured Daughter	Dr. Bairnes	Bondi Pavilion, Sydney with Currency Press	
1977	Big Toys	Terry Legge	UNSW, Sydney, Comedy Theatre, Melbourne, Canberra Theatre with Old Tote Theatre Co	
1978	Makassar Reef	Silver	Russell St Theatre, Melbourne with MTC	
1979	How Sleep the Brave	Lt Commander Harvey	Ensemble Theatre, Sydney	
1980	The Death of Bessie Smith		Ensemble Theatre, Sydney	
1980	The Siege of Frank Sinatra	Leo Coote	Stables Theatre, Sydney with King O'Malley Theatre Co	
1981	Hamlet	Claudius	Sydney Opera House with STC	
1982	The Cake Man		UNSW, Sydney with AETT & Australian Aboriginal Theatre Co	
1982	The Stripper		Kinselas, Sydney with STC	
1982	The Price		Ensemble Theatre, Sydney	
1985–1986	Sons of Cain	Kevin Cassidy	Playhouse, Melbourne, Theatre Royal, Sydney, Space Theatre, Adelaide, Suncorp Theatre, Brisbane, Wyndham's Theatre, London with MTC	
1986–1988	Emerald City	Mike	Sydney Opera House, Lyric Theatre, London with STC	
1987	Siestas in a Pink Hotel		Wharf Theatre, Sydney with STC	
1988	A Streetcar Named Desire		Her Majesty's Theatre Sydney, Lyric Theatre, Brisbane	
1989	The Ham Funeral	Will Lusty	Wharf Theatre, Sydney with STC	
1990	The Tempest	Caliban	Belvoir St Theatre, Sydney	
1990	This Old Man Comes Rolling Home	Tom Dockerty	Russell St Theatre, Melbourne with MTC	
1991	The Revenger's Tragedy		Sydney Opera House with STC	
1991	The Government Inspector		Sydney Opera House with STC	
1991	Summer of the Seventeenth Doll	Barney	Seymour Centre, Sydney	
1992	Uncle Vanya		Sydney Opera House with STC	
1993	Humorists Read the Humorists		Canberra Theatre with Comedy Summit	
1994	A Cheery Soul	Mr Custance / Mrs Jebb / Little Boy (Les)	Her Majesty's Theatre, Adelaide with QTC for Adelaide Festival of the Arts	
1994	Hamlet		Belvoir St Theatre, Sydney	
1995	Flame of Freedom – Australia Remembers		Brisbane Entertainment Centre	
1996	As You Like It		Sydney Opera House with STC	
1996	The Alchemist	Sir Epicure Mammon	Belvoir St Theatre, Sydney	
1997	Death of a Salesman	Willy Loman	Sydney Opera House	
1997	Ngundalehla Godotgai (Waiting for Godot)		Bangarra Studio Theatre, Sydney	
1998	Cloudstreet	Sam Pickles	Berth 9, Sydney with Belvoir Theatre Co, Black Swan Theatre, Malthouse Theatre, Melbourne, Playhouse, Adelaide	
1998	The Sunshine Boys		Ensemble Theatre, Sydney	
1998	The Siege of Frank Sinatra		Ensemble Theatre, Sydney	
1999	Burnt Piano		Belvoir St Theatre, Sydney	
2000	The Small Poppies	Theo	Belvoir St Theatre, Sydney for Sydney Festival	
2000	The Great Man	Terry	Playhouse, Brisbane, Playhouse, Melbourne & Australian tour with QTC	
2000	A Couple of Blaguards	Frank McCourt	Ensemble Theatre, Sydney	
2001	Ashes to Ashes		Belvoir St Theatre, Sydney	
2001	I Ought to Be in Pictures		Ensemble Theatre, Sydney	
2001	Old Masters	Gordon	Wharf Theatre, Sydney with STC	
2002	All My Sons	Joe Keller	Sydney Opera House	
2002	Volpone	Corbaccio	Sydney Opera House	
2002	Buried Child	Dodge	Belvoir Theatre Co, Sydney	
2003	Waiting for Godot	Estragon	Belvoir Theatre Co, Sydney	
2003	The One Day of the Year	Alf	Wharf Theatre, Sydney, Riverside Theatres Parramatta, Newcastle Civic Theatre, Laycock St Theatre, Illawarra Performing Arts Centre, Darlinghurst Theatre, Sydney with STC	
2003	Looking Up Lower	Lennie Lower	Darlinghurst Theatre, Sydney	
2004	Scenes from a Separation	Lawrence Clifford	Sydney Opera House with STC	
2005	The Daylight Atheist	Dan Moffat	Wharf Theatre, Sydney with STC, Space Theatre, Adelaide with STCSA, Glen St Theatre, Sydney	
2005–2006	A Couple of Blaguards	Frank McCourt	Seymour Centre, Sydney, Comedy Theatre, Melbourne	
2007	Lawson: Demons and Dreams	Henry Lawson	Theatre Royal, Sydney, Melbourne Athenaeum, Canberra Theatre, Newcastle Civic Theatre	
2007	Love Lies Bleeding	Alex	Wharf Theatre, Sydney with STC, Glen St Theatre, Sydney	
2008	The Pig Iron People	Kurt	Sydney Opera House with STC	
2010	Twelfth Night	Feste	Australian tour with Bell Shakespeare	
2013	How to Be (Or Not to Be) Lower	Lennie Lower	Street Theatre, Canberra	
2014	Bartleby	Old Lawyer	Street Theatre, Canberra with Aspen Island Theatre Co	
2015–2016	King Lear	Gloucester	Roslyn Packer Theatre with STC	
2015–2020	Dead Men Talking: A Two-Man Show of Verse, Yarns & Song	Henry Lawson	Humph Hall, Sydney, Blue Mountains Theatre, Mudgee Brewing Co, Henry Lawson Theatre, Werrington, Cooma Little Theatre, Sutherland Memorial School of Arts, Belconnen Arts Centre, City Diggers Club, Wollongong, Adelaide Fringe Festival	
2017	Dead Men Laughing	Lennie Lower		

=== As crew ===
Year	Title	Role	Type	Ref
1977	The Training Run	Director / Designer	Bondi Pavilion	
1978	Kitty Howard	Director	Russell St Theatre, Melbourne with MTC	

== Awards and nominations ==
Year	Nominated work	Award	Category	Result	Ref
1984	The Last Bastion	Logie Award	Best Supporting Actor	Won	
1985	Sons of Cain	Sir Laurence Olivier Award	Best Actor	Nominated	
1986	The Flying Doctors	Penguin Award	Best Performance by an Actor	Won	
1990	The Tempest	Sydney Theatre Critics Award	Best Supporting Actor	Won	
1994	Spider and Rose	Film Critics Circle Award	Best Supporting Actor	Won	
1994	Spider and Rose	AFI Award	Best Supporting Actor	Won	
1998	Cloudstreet	Green Room Award	Best Male Actor in a Featured Role	Won	
2005	Love My Way	AFI Television Award	Best Actor in a Supporting or Guest Role in a Television Drama or Comedy	Won	
