= Australian Historical Monographs =

The Australian Historical Monographs are a series of historical studies privately printed by George Mackaness.

A facsimile reprint of the monographs was published in 44 volumes by Bill Hornadge's Review Publications, Dubbo, in 1976.

The complete list is:

No. I.--Robert Louis Stevenson: His Associations with Australia. 9 May 1935. Limited to thirty copies.

No. II.--Some Fictitious Voyages to Australia. 9 August 1937. Limited to thirty-five copies.

No. III.—George Augustus Robinson's Journey to South-Eastern Australia, 1884, with George Henry Haydon’s Narrative of Part of the Same Journey. 15 November 1941. Limited to fifty copies for sale and ten for presentation.

No. IV.—Some Private Correspondence of the Rev. Samuel Marsden and Family. 29 February 1942. Limited to ninety copies for sale and ten for presentation.

No. V.—Account of the Duel between William Bland and Robert Case, with a Report of the Trial, Tex v. Bland. 20 September 1942. Limited to ninety copies for sale and ten for presentation.

No. VI.—Some Proposals for Establishing Colonies in the South Seas. 12 March 1943. Limited to ninety copies for sale and ten for presentation.

No. VII.—Alexander Dalrymple's "A Serious Admonition to the Public on the Intended Thief Colony at Botany Bay.” With a Memoir. 12 July 1943. Limited to ninety copied for sale and ten for presentation.

No. VIII.—Captain William Bligh's Discoveries and Observations in Van Diemen’s Land. 14 October 1943. Limited to ninety copies for sale and fifteen for presentation.

No. IX.—Ducharme’s "Journal of Political Exile in Australia". 28 June 1944. Limited to ninety copies for sale and ten for presentation.

No. X.—"The Van Diemen’s Land Warriors", with an Essay on Matthew Brady. 8 September 1944. Limited to ninety copies for sale and ten for presentation.

No. XI.—Michael Howe, the Last and Worst of the Bushrangers of Van Diemen’s Land. 10 March 1945. Limited to ninety copies for sale and ten for presentation.

No. XII.—Letters from an Exile at Botany Bay to his Aunt in Dumfries. 20 July 1945. Limited to ninety copies for sale and ten for presentation.

No. XIII.—Odes of Michael Massey Robinson, First Poet Laureate of Australia. (1754-1826.) 31 May 1946. Limited to ninety copies for sale and ten for presentation.

No. XIV.—Flinders’ Observations on the Coasts of Van Diemen’s Land, on Bass’s Strait and the Islands....30 October 1946. Limited to ninety copies for sale and ten for presentation.

No. XV—Some Private Correspondence of Sir John and Lady Jane Franklin. (In two parts.) 11 July 1947. Limited to ninety copies for sale and ten for presentation.

No. XVI.—Slavery and Famine: Punishments for Sedition; or an Account of the Miseries and Starvation at Botany Bay. 20 December 1947. Limited to ninety copies for sale and ten for presentation.

No. XVII.—Memoirs of George Suttor, F.L.S., Banksian Collector. 30 June 1948. Limited to one hundred copies for sale and twenty-five for presentation.

No. XVIII.—Notes of a Convict of 1838. 1 June 1949. Limited to one hundred and twenty-five copies for sale and ten for presentation. One hundred copies have also been printed for Canada.

No. XIX.—Some Correspondence of Captain William Bligh, R.N., with John and Francis Godolphin Bond, 1776-1811. 30 November 1949. Limited to one hundred and twenty-five copies for sale and fifteen for presentation.

No. XX.—Fourteen Journeys over the Blue Mountains of New South Wales, 1813-1841. (In three parts.) PART I.—1813-1815. 30 May 1950. Limited to one hundred and thirty-five copies for sale and fifteen for presentation.

No. XXI.—Fourteen Journeys over the Blue Mountains of New South Wales, 1813-1841. (In three parts.) PART II.—1819-1827. 31 August 1950. Limited to one hundred and thirty-five copied for sale and fifteen for presentation.

No. XXII.—Fourteen Journeys over the Blue Mountains of New South Wales, 1813-1841. (In three parts.)PART III.—1835-1882. 30 March 1951. Limited to one hundred and thirty-five copies for sale and fifteen for presentation.

No. XXIII.—A New Song, made in New South Wales on the Rebellion. 28 September 1951. Limited to one hundred and thirty-five copies for sale and fifteen for presentation.

No. XXIV.—A Chronology of Momentous Events in Australian History. (In two parts.) PART I. (1788–1828), by Robert Howe. 29 February 1952. Limited to one hundred and thirty-five copies for sale and fifteen for presentation.

No. XXV.—A Chronology of Momentous Events in Australian History. (In two parts.) PART II. (1829–1846), by Francis Low. 20 April 1952. Limited to one hundred and thirty-five copies for sale and fifteen for presentation.

No. XXVI.—The Correspondence of John Cotton, Victorian Pioneer, 1842-1849. (In three parts.) PART I. (1842–1844). 28 February 1953. Limited to one hundred and thirty-five copies for sale and fifteen for presentation.

No. XXVII.—The Correspondence of John Cotton, Victorian Pioneer, 1842-1849. (In three parts.) PART II. (1844–1847). 28 February 1953. Limited to one hundred and thirty-five copies for sale and fifteen for presentation.

No. XXVIII.—The Correspondence of John Cotton, Victorian Pioneer, 1842-1849. (In three parts.) PART III. (1847–1849). 28 February 1953. Limited to one hundred and thirty-five copies for sale and fifteen for presentation.

No. XXIX.—Fresh Light on Bligh, being Some Unpublished Correspondence of Captain William Bligh, R.N., and Lieut. Francis Godolphin Bond, R.N. 30 October 1953. Limited to one hundred and thirty-five copies for sale and fifteen for presentation.

No. XXX.—Some Letters of the Rev. Richard Johnson, B.A., First Chaplain of New South Wales. (In two parts.) PART I. 21 October 1954. Limited to one hundred and thirty-five copies for sale and fifteen for presentation.

No. XXXI.—Some Letters of the Rev. Richard Johnson, B.A., First Chaplain of New South Wales. (In two parts.) PART II. 21 October 1954. Limited to one hundred and thirty-five copies for sale and fifteen for presentation.

No. XXXII.—David Burn’s Narrative of the Overland Journey of Sir John and Lady Franklin and Party from Hobart Town to Macquarie Harbour (1842). 30 April 1955. Limited to one hundred and thirty-five copies for sale and fifteen for presentation.

No. XXXIII.—Australian Gold Discovery. No. 1—Australian Gold Fields: Their Discovery, Progress and Prospects, by R. S. Anderson. 1853. 31 January 1956. Limited to one hundred and thirty-five copies for sale and fifteen for presentation.

No. XXXIV.—Australian Gold Discovery. No. 2—Murray’s Guide to the Diggings, 1852. 31 January 1956. Limited to one hundred and thirty-five copies for sale and fifteen for presentation.

No. XXXV.—The Discovery and Exploration of Moreton Bay and the Brisbane River (1799–1823). (In two parts.) PART I.—(a) Lieutenant James Cook’s Voyage in H.M.S. "Endeavour", 1770; (b) Lieutenant Matthew Flinders’s Voyage in H. M. Sloop "Norfolk", 1799; (c) Commander Matthew Flinders’s Voyage in H.M.S. "Investigator", 1802; (d) Captain John Bingle’s Log of H. M. Cutter "Sally", 1822; (e) The Expedition of Captain William Lawrence Edwardson, 1822. 30 December 1956. Limited to one hundred and thirty-five copies for sale and fifteen for presentation.

No. XXXVI.—The Discovery and Exploration of Moreton Bay and the Brisbane River (1799–1823). (In two parts.) PART II.—(a) Report on an Expedition to Survey Port Curtis, Moreton Bay and Port Bowen, with view to form Convict Penal Settlements there, by John Oxley, Surveyor General; (b) An Extract from John Oxley’s MS. Field Book; (c) John Uniacke’s Narrative of the same Expedition; (d) Narrative of Thomas Pamphlet taken down by John Uniacke. 30 December 1956. Limited to one hundred and thirty-five copies for sale and fifteen for presentation.

No. XXXVII.—Australian Gold Discovery. No. 3—A Short Account of the late Discoveries of Gold in Australia, with Notes of a Visit to the Gold District. By John Elphinstone Erskine, Captain, R. N. 30 November 1957. Limited to one hundred and thirty-five copies for sale and fifteen for presentation.

No. XXXVIII.—The Australian Journal of William Strutt, A.R.A., 1850-1862. (In two parts.) 30 December 1958. Limited to one hundred and thirty-five copies for sale and fifteen for presentation.

No. XXXIX.—The History of the Island of Van Diemen’s Land, from the year 1824 to 1835 inclusive. By Henry Melville. Hobart Town. 15 November 1959. Limited to one hundred and thirty-five copies for sale and fifteen for presentation.

No. XL.—Recollections of Life in Van Dieman’s Land. By William Gates, one of the Canadian Patriots. Lockport, U.S.A., 1850. In two parts, 28 February 1961. Limited to one hundred and thirty-five copies for sale and fifteen for presentation.

No. XLI.—Governor Phillip in Retirement. By Sir Frederick Chapman. 30 July 1962. Limited to two hundred copies.
