= Bill Hornadge =

Australian philatelic dealer, publisher and writer

Bill Hornadge (1918-2013) was an Australian publisher, journalist, author and philatelic dealer. He founded Seven Seas Stamps which became the largest mail-order stamp firm in the Southern Hemisphere and published the Stamp News magazine which still exists today under the title Stamp & Coin News Australasia Magazine.

== Early life and career ==
Bill Hornadge was born William Hornadge on 12 November 1918 in Sydney, New South Wales.

His first paid employment was a temporary job at the age of sixteen with Smith's Weekly and in 1934 he published his first work with The Australian Women's Weekly. Aiming for a job with a major newspaper, he studied shorthand at a technical college for six months.

At the same time he began selling stamps from his home in Catherine Hill Bay, a coal-mining settlement south of Newcastle. At age eighteen he launched The Australian Stamp Collector magazine and a wholesale stamp approvals programme which he named the South Seas Stamp Club.

He began to rise through the ranks of the newspaper industry, being appointed in 1942 as a junior journalist with The Northern Star in Lismore, New South Wales, before moving over to the North Coast Review in Murwillumbah and then to The Sydney Morning Herald. He married Jean Dunning in 1943.

At the age of 31 Hornadge was appointed as editor of the Daily Liberal, a tri-weekly newspaper in Dubbo in central New South Wales, that was owned by Leo Armati, a "distinguished journalist" and "hard taskmaster". During the latter's absences Hornadge was thrown into managing and editing roles, a valuable experience.

== Seven Seas Stamps ==
In 1951, after resigning from the Daily Liberal, Hornadge founded a philatelic dealership known as Seven Seas Stamps in Dubbo. The business grew rapidly. In April 1954 he founded the Stamp News magazine which replicated his earlier publication, the Australian Stamp Collector, but this time with "great success". The magazine combined collecting articles, news, advertisements and market information and some issues ran to hundreds of pages.

Hornadge joined the Australian Stamp Dealers' Association, now the Australasian Philatelic Traders' Association (APTA), in June 1952. He served as its president in 1961–62 and was subsequently made an honorary life member.

In 1957 Seven Seas began to sell stamps "on approval", a system whereby selections of stamps were posted to customers, who retained and paid for the items they wanted and returned the balance, and over the next ten years promoted his approvals to children by taking out full-page advertisements in Australian comic books. He discovered that adults were also keen stamp collectors. These approvals offerings met with such success with the stamp-buying public that Seven Seas Stamps would in time become the "largest mail order operation of its kind in the world". At its peak the firm had a roster of 79 employees and ranked as the world's largest philatelic dealership after "Stanley Gibbons in the United Kingdom and H. E. Harris and Co. in the U.S.".

In 1963 Seven Seas was engaged by Ampol Petroleum to handle a "major national sales promotion based on stamp collecting". Initially planned to last three months and distribute two million mystery packets of real postage stamps from around the world to be given away free to Australian drivers who purchased Ampol petrol, the campaign was very successful with the public and was extended to last eighteen months with Seven Seas assembling "250,000 packets of stamps a week" to meet the demand. Other major Australian companies including "Coles, Woolworths, Cottee's and Quaker Oats Company" joined Ampol and ordered millions of packets of stamps for distribution to their customers.

Hornadge sold Seven Seas Stamps in 1971 to Sydney businessman Kevin Duffy, who in turn sold it to Reader's Digest in 1980. Hornadge retained ownership of the Stamp News magazine and continued to do "business with clients overseas via direct mail catalogues". In 1983 Stamp News, then owned by Review Publications, was sold to Macquarie Publications. Hornadge had been the magazine's editor for 29 years. Renamed as Stamp & Coin News Australasia Magazine, the magazine continues to operate today as the Southern Hemisphere’s only stamp and coin publication.

In 1977 Hornadge launched the Cinderella Corner column in Stamp News which currently continues as a monthly fixture focusing on "cinderella issues" (labels and stamp-like issues outside conventional government postage).

== Writing, publishing and bookselling ==
Hornadge was an "archetypal storyteller" and the "prolific author of mostly self-published gems on the most obscure topics" including Australian slang, racial attitudes, eccentrics and social reformers, local history, cricket, utopian settlements and Australian humour. Many of those books were of a humorous and idiosyncratic nature and which would appeal to the general reader rather than to the academic specialist.

Those books included Chidley's Answer to the Sex Problem (1971) about the unconventional Australian social and sexual reformer William James Chidley; The Yellow Peril: A Squint at Some Australian Attitudes Towards Orientals (1971) in which he examined some aspects of Australian racial history; and The Australian Slanguage: A Look at What We Say and How We Say It (1980), which became one of his best-known works and is still cited in bibliographies of Australian English and folklore.

Among his other works were Lennie Lower: He Made a Nation Laugh (1993), a biography of the celebrated Smith's Weekly humorist; The Search for an Australian Paradise (1999) which surveyed Australian schemes for utopian settlements, communal experiments and imagined paradises; and Cricket in Australia 1804–1884 (2006) which appeared when Hornadge was in his late eighties.

He wrote several works on the town in which he lived, including Dubbo: The Story of Dubbo's Growth from Village to Town to City (1976), Dubbo Walkabout and Dubbo Sketchbook.

Hornadge operated a book publishing firm named Review Publications through which many of his own books as well as those by others were published.

He was a serious philatelic publisher whose titles included Stamps: A Collector's Guide (1968- ); Cinderella Stamps of Australasia (1974), Stamp Investment Guidelines (1976; revised 1979), The Pitcairn Islands Stamp Catalogue (1976; revised 1981), Philatelic Fables (1980) and Local Stamps of Australia (1982).

Between approximately 1990 and 2000 he produced around 860 pages of illustrated Cinderella price lists through Review Publications. These were later digitised as a searchable philatelic reference, testimony to the amount of specialist information he continued to compile well into old age.

In the 1950s Hornadge also founded a mail-order book business known as The Book Connection. It offered free illustrated catalogues and specialised in such fields as self-sufficiency, small farming, alternative lifestyles, food and health, environment, arts and crafts, recreation, and books for writers operated. For a period it operated from 1 Sterling Street, Dubbo, an address shared by Hornadge's Review Publications and Stamp News. In about 1990 The Book Connection was sold to the Pankhurst family and in 2026 a bricks and mortar shopfront of The Book Connection was still trading in Dubbo.

== Later years ==
Bill Hornadge was closely involved in Dubbo civic and cultural life. He helped establish the Dubbo Philatelic Society and a local branch of Rostrum, participated actively in Rotary, and for years was involved in the Rotary Youth Exchange programme. In later life he taught Australian history courses through the University of the Third Age (U3A) where he taught "universally popular" Australian history classes.

== Personal life ==
Hornadge was described as "always impeccably dressed, often wearing a suit and tie", a clothing choice that matched his "meticulous" style of writing and presentation. His personality was said to be "disarmingly cheery and charmingly offbeat" with a dose of "joie de vivre".

He died at West Gosford, New South Wales on 21 March 2013, leaving daughters Kerrie and Lindy, six grandchildren and, at the time of his death, two great-grandchildren. His wife Jean had died in 1990.

== Bibliography ==
=== Books written by Bill Hornadge ===
- Ern Malley and the "Angry Penguins" : Being a Review of the Greatest Hoax in Australia's Literary History, and the Subsequent "Indecency Trial", Lismore: W. Hornadge, c. 1945.
- Explore Australia Through Stamps : An Illustrated History of Australia As Depicted on the Nation's Postage Stamps, Dubbo, N.S.W.: Review Publications, c. 1969-71. With cartoons by Monty Wedd.
- Chidley's Answer to the Sex Problem: A Squint at the Life and Theories of William James Chidley, and the Reactions of Society Towards his Unorthodox Views, Dubbo, N.S.W.: Review Publications, 1971.
- The Yellow Peril: A Squint at Some Australian Attitudes towards Orientals, Dubbo, N.S.W.: Review Publications , 1971; 2nd ed., 1976.
- If It Moves, Shoot It: A Squint at Some Australian Attitudes Towards the Kangaroo, Dubbo, N.S.W.: Review Publications, 1972.
- Old Bore's Down Under Almanac for 1978 , Woolwich, N.S.W.: Bacchus Books, 1977.
- The Australian Slanguage: A Look At What We Say and How We Say It, North Ryde: Cassell Australia, 1980; revised ed., Richmond, Victoria, Methuen Australia, 1986; revised ed., Melbourne: Mandarin, 1989.
- The Boy Who Talked with Bunyips, Dubbo: Macquarie Publications, 1980; 2nd ed., Great Neck, N.Y.: Todd & Honeywell, 1980.
- Philatelic Fables, Dubbo, N.S.W.: Review Publications, 1980. With illustrations by Bob Swinfield.
- How To Publish Your Own Book: A Complete Guide to Self-Publishing in Australia , Dubbo, N.S.W.: Review Publications, 1983.
- The Ugly Australian: Candid Comments, Woolwich, N.S.W.: Bacchus Books, Australia, 1976; Kenthurst, N.S.W.: Kangaroo Press, 1985. Illustrated by Alan Moir.
- Collecting Stamps in Australia & New Zealand, Kenthurst, N.S.W.: Kangaroo Press, 1986.
- The Hidden History of Australia, Watsons Bay, N.S.W.; ETT Imprint, 1993.
- Lennie Lower: He Made a Nation Laugh, Pymble: Angus and Robertson, 1993.
- The Journal of John O'Brien, Sydney: ETT Imprint, 2004.
- The Poppy Crop: Mayhem in the Bush , Hartwell, Victoria: Temple House/Sid Harta, 2005.
- Cricket in Australia 1804-1884, Dubbo, N.S.W.: Review Publications, 2006.

=== Articles written by Bill Hornadge ===
- "An Accidental Conception Rests in Peace", in: Newswrite: The NSW Writers' Centre Magazine, no. 154, Dec.2005-Jan. 2006.

=== Book series published by Bill Hornadge ===
- Australian Historical Monographs series (1976) - a facsimile reprint series which had been originally privately published by George Mackaness.
