= Neomodernism =

Philosophical movement

Neomodernism is a philosophical movement based on modernism which addressess the critique of modernism by postmodernism. It is rooted in the criticisms which Habermas has leveled at postmodern philosophy, namely that universalism and critical thinking are the two essential elements of human rights and that human rights create a superiority of some cultures over others.

== Associated individuals ==
=== Ágnes Heller ===
Ágnes Heller's work is associated with Moral Anthropology and "probing modernity's destiny for a non-predatory humanism that combines the existential wisdom of ancient theory with modern values."

Neomodernism accepts some aspects of postmodernism's critique of modernism, notably that modernism elevated the world view of dominant groups to the status of objective fact, thereby failing to express the viewpoint of "subaltern groups," such as women and ethnic minorities. However, in her view, neomodernism rejects postmodernism as:

- Unscientific: the ability of science to generate useful knowledge cannot be waved away as "scientism".
- Journalism: as not giving any explanation as to how or why things happen.
- Local: as being unable to recognize patterns that occur across time or location.
- Unverified: as lacking any validation process, and therefore proceeding by fad and hierarchy.

=== Victor Grauer ===
In 1982, Victor Grauer attacked "the cult of the new," and proposed that there had arisen a "neo-modern" movement in the arts which was based on deep formal rigor, rather than on "the explosion of pluralism." His argument was that post-modernism was exclusively a negative attack on modernism, and had no future separate from modernism proper, a point of view which is held by many scholars of modernism.

=== Carlos Escudé ===
In "Natural Law at War", a review essay published on 31 May 2002 in The Times Literary Supplement (London, TLS No. 5174), Carlos Escudé wrote: “Postmodern humanity faces a major challenge. It must solve a dilemma it does not want to face. If all cultures are morally equivalent, then all human individuals are not endowed with the same human rights, because some cultures award some men more rights than are allotted to other men and women. If, on the other hand, all men and women are endowed with the same human rights, then all cultures are not morally equivalent, because cultures that acknowledge that ‘all men are created equal’ are to be regarded as ‘superior,’ or ‘more advanced’ in terms of their civil ethics than those that do not.” Escudé's brand of neomodernism contends with “politically-correct intellectuals who prefer to opt for the easy way out, asserting both that we all have the same human rights and that all cultures are equal.”

== Other uses ==
Neomodernism has been cited in law as applying to an approach which grants economic rights to indigenous peoples, but without restricting them to their traditional economic activities. Neomodernism recognizes the importance of the human side of organizations. People and their needs are put at the center and, with the recognition that the values and beliefs of people both shape and are shaped by their experiences of organizational life, comes an interest in areas such as organizational culture, leadership and management.

Social scientist Dr Ross Honeywill argues in Being NEO (2023) that 1991 saw the death of postmodernity and the emergence of neomodernity in what he calls the social bifurcation or split. Neomodernists, abbreviated to NEOs, were new, he argues, particularly compared to traditionalism’s two-century lineage. NEOs were socially progressive individualists with a humanist leaning towards social justice and emotional experiences that touched their spirit. On the other hand, traditionalists continued being socially and politically conservative, more driven by the rational than the emotional. They valued hard work, discipline, and a strong sense of duty, mirroring the ethos of early industrial society – moral rectitude, social hierarchy, and a clear demarcation of gender roles. Their unbroken lineage produced a mindset where family, propriety, and community held significant importance.

== See also ==
- Critical theory
