= House Gang =

House Gang could refer to:

- House Gang, an Australian comedy series
- List of Wu-Tang Clan affiliates (Inspectah Deck's group)
