= Major AWGIE Award =

Australian Writers Guild award

The Major AWGIE Award is awarded by the Australian Writers Guild for the outstanding script of the year at the annual AWGIE Awards for Australian performance writing. It is selected from individual category winners across the range of performance writing categories, covering film, television, stage, radio and interactive media.

== Winners ==
The tables below show the winning writer(s) and work in each year and the work's category, since the awards began.

=== 1960s ===
Year	Writer(s)	Work	Category
1968 (1st)
1968 (1st)	Colin Free	“Cage a Tame Tiger”, Contrabandits	TV
1968 (1st)	Richard Lane	You Can’t See 'Round Corners	TV Serial
1969 (2nd)
1969 (2nd)	Alan Hopgood	The Cheerful Cuckold	Tele-play

=== 1970s ===
Year	Writer(s)	Work	Category
1970 (3rd)
1970 (3rd)	Mungo MacCallum	The Stoneham Obsessions	Radio Feature
1971 (4th)
1971 (4th)	Michael Boddy & Bob Ellis	The Legend of King O'Malley	Stage
1972 (5th)
1972 (5th)	David Williamson	The Removalists	Stage
1973 (6th)
1973 (6th)	Tony Morphett	“Freda”, Certain Women	TV
1974 (7th)
1974 (7th)	Cliff Green	Marion	TV Play
1975 (8th)
1975 (8th)	Jim McNeil	How Does Your Garden Grow?	Stage
1976 (9th)
1976 (9th)	No major award		
1977 (10th)
1977 (10th)	Steve J. Spears	The Elocution of Benjamin Franklin	Stage
1978 (11th)
1978 (11th)	David Williamson	The Club	Stage
1979 (12th)
1979 (12th)	Tony Morphett	“A Matter of Life and Death”, Against The Wind	TV

=== 1980s ===
Year	Writer(s)	Work	Category
1980 (13th)
1980 (13th)	No major award		
1981 (14th)
1981 (14th)	Ken Kelso	Manganinnie	Film Adaptation
1982 (15th)
1982 (15th)	Ron Elisha	Einstein	Stage Original
1983 (16th)
1983 (16th)	Hyllus Maris & Sonia Borg	Women of the Sun	TV Original
1984 (17th)
1984 (17th)	Robert Caswell	Scales of Justice	TV Original
1985 (18th)
1985 (18th)	Peter Carey & Ray Lawrence	Bliss	Film Adaptation
1986 (19th)
1986 (19th)	Glenda Hambly	Fran	Film
1987 (20th)
1987 (20th)	Michael Gow	Away	Stage
1988 (21st)
1988 (21st)	Anthony Wheeler	Olive	TV Original
1989 (22nd)
1989 (22nd)	Peter Schreck	The Soldier Settlers	TV Original

=== 1990s ===
Year	Writer(s)	Work	Category
1990 (23rd)
1990 (23rd)	Nick Enright	Daylight Saving	Stage
1991 (24th)
1991 (24th)	Keith Thompson	“A General Malaise”, G.P.	TV series
1992 (25th)
1992 (25th)	Michael Cove	The Habit	Radio Original
1993 (26th)
1993 (26th)	Nick Enright	A Property of the Clan	Theatre-in-Education (TIE)
1994 (27th)
1994 (27th)	Peta Murray	The Keys to the Animal Room	TIE
1995(28th)
1995(28th)	Chris Noonan & George Miller	Babe	Feature Adaptation
1996 (29th)
1996 (29th)	Rivka Hartman	The Miniskirted Dynamo	Documentary Public Broadcast
1997 (30th)
1997 (30th)	Nick Enright	Blackrock	Feature Adaptation
1998 (31st)
1998 (31st)	Andrea Lemon	Rodeo Noir	Stage
1999 (32nd)
1999 (32nd)	Andrew Bovell, Patricia Cornelius, Melissa Reeves, Christos Tsiolkas	Who’s Afraid of the Working Class	Stage
1999 (32nd)	Justin Monjo & Nick Enright	Cloudstreet	Stage

=== 2000s ===
Year	Writer(s)	Work	Category
2000 (33rd)
2000 (33rd)	Patricia Cornelius	Hogs, Hairs & Leeches	Community Theatre
2001 (34th)
2001 (34th)	John Romeril (with Rachel Perkins)	One Night the Moon	TV Original
2002 (35th)
2002 (35th)	Dennis K. Smith	Rainbow Bird and Monster Man	Documentary Broadcast
2003 (36th)
2003 (36th)	Tony McNamara	The Rage in Placid Lake	Feature Original
2004 (37th)
2004 (37th)	Cate Shortland	Somersault	Feature Original
2005 (38th)
2005 (38th)	Melissa Reeves	The Spook	Stage
2006 (39th)
2006 (39th)	Katherine Thomson & Barbara Samuels	Answered by Fire	Television Mini Series Original
2007 (40th)
2007 (40th)	Keith Thompson	Clubland	Feature Original
2008 (41st)
2008 (41st)	Peter Gawler, Greg Haddrick & Felicity Packard	Underbelly	TV mini series adaptation
2009 (42nd)
2009 (42nd)	Warwick Thornton	Samson and Delilah	Feature Original

=== 2010s ===
Year	Writer(s)	Work	Category
2010 (43rd)
2010 (43rd)	David Michôd	Animal Kingdom	Feature Film Original
2011 (44th)
2011 (44th)	Patricia Cornelius	Do Not Go Gentle	Stage
2012 (45th)
2012 (45th)	Tony Briggs and Keith Thompson	The Sapphires	Feature Film Adaptation
2013 (46th)
2013 (46th)	Alana Valentine	Grounded	Community & Youth Theatre
2014 (47th)
2014 (47th)	Blake Ayshford, Shelley Birse & Justin Monjo	The Code	Television Mini-Series Original
2015 (48th)
2015 (48th)	Andrew Knight and Andrew Anastasios	The Water Diviner	Feature Film - Original
2016 (49th)
2016 (49th)	Shelley Birse	The Code: season 2	Television Miniseries – Original
2017 (50th)
2017 (50th)	Leah Purcell	The Drover's Wife	Stage
2018 (51st)
2018 (51st)	Bradley Slabe	Lost & Found	Animation
2019 (52nd)
2019 (52nd)	Kate Mulvany	The Harp in the South	Stage

=== 2020s ===
Year	Writer(s)	Work	Category
2020 (53rd)
2020 (53rd)	Suzie Miller	Prima Facie	Stage
2021 (54rd)
2021 (54rd)	Kodie Bedford	Cursed!	Stage
