= Colleen Anne Fitzpatrick =

Australian model, actress and filmmaker (1938–2017)

- Born: 5 January 1938; Sydney, New South Wales, Australia
- Died: 12 August 2017 (aged 79)
- Occupations: Model; Actress; Filmmaker
- Years active: 1959–1996
- Spouse: Max Cullen (1973–1987)
- Children: Katharine Cullen

Colleen Anne Fitzpatrick (5 January 1938 – 12 August 2017) was an Australian model, actress and filmmaker.

== Early life ==
Fitzpatrick was born in Sydney, New South Wales, Australia, and was of Irish descent. Fitzpatrick trained as an actor with American Hayes Gordon at The Ensemble Studios of Sydney's Ensemble Theatre. Later in life, she completed a Bachelor of Arts (Communications) majoring in film at the University of Technology, Sydney (UTS).

== Career ==
=== Modelling ===
A prominent international catwalk, television and photographic model from 1959 to 1972, Fitzpatrick appeared in over 200 commercials, on countless magazine covers, and was contracted for various campaigns including Ford cars, becoming famous for her comedic flair working with the likes of John Cleese.

=== Theatre ===
She was a company member of The Sydney Theatre Company, formerly The Old Tote Theatre Company from 1972 to 1974 appearing in productions of King Lear, Threepenny Opera, Playboy of the Western World, Richard II, Macbeth and David Williamson's What If You Died Tomorrow? opening at the Sydney Opera House in 1973. Other theatre work included Pride and Prejudice, The House of Bernarda Alba, In the Boom Boom Room, Crimes of the Heart for the Ensemble Rep, When in Rome for the Ensemble Theatre, and 'night, Mother and A Day in the Death of Joe Egg for Belvoir St Theatre.

=== Film and television ===
Film and television work includes lead roles in The Pleasure Girls made in 1965 about a model finding herself swept up in swinging sixties London, Games for Parents and Other Children, A Girl's Own Story by Jane Campion, Rebel, starring Matt Dillon, the miniseries Bodyline as Don Bradman's mother, Police Rescue, 12 episodes of the Australian series Sons and Daughters as the evil Jean Hopkins, Home and Away, Outbreak of Hostilities, The Four Minute Mile, A Country Practice, Whipping Boy and Soldier Soldier.

== Personal life and death ==
Fitzpatrick was formerly married to actor Max Cullen from 1973 to 1987. Together they have one daughter, actress Katharine Cullen (born 9 June 1975), and a grandson William Richards (born 17 August 2013).

Fitzpatrick died peacefully on 12 August 2017 from Motor Neurone Disease.

== Filmography ==
Colleen Anne Fitzpatrick film and television credits
Year	Title	Role	Notes	Ref.
1965	The Pleasure Girls	Cobber	Theatrical film	
1975	Games for Parents and Other Children	Unknown	Television film	
1983	Outbreak of Hostilities	Barbara Benton	Television film	
1984	A Girl's Own Story	Mother	Short film	
1984	Bodyline	Mrs Bradman	Television miniseries	
1985	A Country Practice	Mrs Kirby	2 episodes	
1985	Rebel	Nosy neighbour's wife	Theatrical film	
1986	Sons and Daughters	Jean Hopkins	12 episodes	
1988	Home and Away	Helen Patterson	1 episode	
1988	The Four Minute Mile	Elva Landy	Television miniseries	
1992, 1993	Police Rescue	Fay McClintock	2 episodes	
1994	Heartbreak High	Bibi Taggart	1 episode	
1995	Soldier Soldier	Mary Jane Harvey	1 episode	
1996	Whipping Boy	Cass's mother	Television film	

== Theatre ==
Colleen Anne Fitzpatrick theatre credits
Year	Title	Role	Notes	Ref.
1973	King Lear	Cordelia / Regan	Sydney Theatre Company	
1973	Threepenny Opera	Unknown	Sydney Opera House for Old Tote Theatre Company	
1973	Playboy of the Western World	Unknown	Sydney Opera House for Old Tote Theatre Company	
1973	Richard II	Queen Isabel	Sydney Opera House for Old Tote Theatre Company	
1973	What If You Died Tomorrow?	Unknown	Sydney Opera House for Old Tote Theatre Company	
1974	Macbeth	Unknown	Sydney Opera House for Old Tote Theatre Company	
Unknown	Pride and Prejudice	Unknown	Ensemble Rep	
Unknown	The House of Bernarda Alba	Unknown	Ensemble Rep	
Unknown	In the Boom Boom Room	Unknown	Ensemble Rep	
Unknown	Crimes of the Heart	Unknown	Ensemble Rep	
1976	Falling Apart	Unknown	New Theatre, Sydney	
1981	When in Rome	Margaret Reilly	Phillip Street Theatre & Ensemble Theatre	
1990	The Compositor & Twenty Minutes With an Angel	Unknown	Lookout Theatre	
1992	'night, Mother	Unknown	Belvoir St Theatre	
Unknown	A Day in the Death of Joe Egg	Unknown	Belvoir St Theatre	
