= The Girl from Tomorrow Part II: Tomorrow's End =

- Tomorrow's End title screen
- Also known as: Tomorrow's End; Girl From Tomorrow 2; Girl From Tomorrow Part 2
- Genre: Science fiction; Time travel; Adventure; Children's television series; Action
- Created by: Mark Shirrefs; John Thomson
- Written by: Mark Shirrefs; John Thomson
- Directed by: Noel Price
- Starring: Katharine Cullen; Melissa Marshall; John Howard; Helen O'Connor; Andrew Clarke; James Findlay; Miles Buchanan; Jeremy Scrivener; Marshall Napier; Catherine McClements
- Voices of: unknown as P.J.
- Theme music composer: Ian Davidson
- Composer: Ian Davidson
- Country of origin: Australia
- Original language: English
- No. of seasons: 1
- No. of episodes: 12

Production
- Producers: Noel Price; Dennis Kiely
- Editor: Kerry Regan
- Camera setup: Single-camera
- Running time: 23–24 minutes
- Production companies: Film Australia; Nine Network Australia

Original release
- Network: Nine Network
- Release: 22 September – 9 October 1992

Related
- The Girl from Tomorrow

The Girl from Tomorrow Part II: Tomorrow's End is an Australian children's television series created by Film Australia. The series is a sequel series to The Girl from Tomorrow, and was first broadcast in 1992.

The story follows on from the first series with new dangers and adventures, primarily focusing around the events in the year 2500.

== Premise ==
At the end of the previous series, Jenny Kelly was badly injured in the final struggle with Silverthorn for the Time Capsule, and must be taken to the year 3000, to be healed there. The story picks up a month after Jenny and Alana arrive back to the year 3000. The scientists soon realise that their time travel experiments have gone wrong and that they have altered the course of history. They must send Jenny and Silverthorn back to their respective times, in order to restore the timeline. Silverthorn, having faked remorse for his crimes, has surreptitiously stolen instructions for building the Time Gate. With Silverthorn and Jenny back in their own times, Alana and Lorien (Catherine McClements) return to the year 3000, only to discover that it is a radioactive wasteland: The Great Disaster has destroyed the Southern Hemisphere as well as the Northern Hemisphere. They go back to 2500 and find that that era has not been altered, so they realise that it must be something Silverthorn does in 2500 that changes history and leads to The Great Disaster. In order to restore the timeline, Alana and Lorien must discover the cause of The Great Disaster, and prevent it.

The year 2500 is a polluted, miserable dystopia, where GlobeCorp owns everything, and the majority of people live in relative squalor. Clean water and uncontaminated food are hard to come by, although the elite enjoy life in comfortable skyscrapers, and the top leaders live in a colony on the Moon.

With the help of Jenny and Nik, Alana must search for the cause of The Great Disaster, while evading capture by the GlobeCops and new villain Draco. They must also find a way to stop Silverthorn's plan to transport water from 1990 to the year 2500, which he does by using the Year 3000 information he has stolen to construct the Time Gate.

== Production ==
The Girl from Tomorrow Part II: Tomorrow's End has 12 episodes. It was produced by Film Australia and broadcast on Nine Network. Kathy Mueller directed the series, Noel Price was the producer, and Ron Saunders was the executive produer. Mark Shirrefs and John Thomson wrote the television series.

== Character profiles ==
=== James Rooney ===
James is the science teacher at the high school Jenny attends. Irene fell for him when she met him after enrolling Alana there. James helped all the others in their efforts to retrieve the Capsule so Alana could return home.

=== Draco ===
Draco is a manager of GlobeCorp, a company that runs the entire planet. He wants to get rid of Paradise and the other GlobeCorp leaders, so he could run GlobeCorp all by himself.

=== Nik ===
Nik is a fifteen-year-old boy from the year 2500. Nik helps out Jenny and Alana when they are both captured by GlobeCorp. Nik's grandmother, Maeve is the inventor of the first Transducer.

=== Lorien ===
Lorien is one of Alana's guardians while she is living on Earth. She is also Bruno's assistant on the Time Travel Project.

== Technology in the year 2500 ==
In the year 2500, technology is more advanced than in 1990. Some of the technology is described below.

=== Laser pistols ===
The most often used weapon in use in the year 2500 is the laser pistol. When the pistol is used, the trigger is held, allowing energy to build up within the target, and when the trigger is released the energy within the object causes it to explode.

=== Storeman ===
Molecular Level Music Storage Unit. A device in the year 2500 which is used to play and store music. The sphere glows different colours as it plays. Seen once in episode 202 "The End of Everything", the second episode of this series.

=== Drone ===
This object works as a camera. It has the shape of a red tube. It has a microphone and also has the ability to be far from its operator.

=== The Modification Chamber ===
This is where the process of "Modification" takes place, a euphemism for brainwashing. This process is used on anybody who has been arrested. The person is placed in the chamber and when the machine is activated they are bathed in white light; this process freezes the subject's mind. This essentially removes the person's free will. After the process the person will obey simple commands and they are then put to work doing menial tasks.

== Technology in the year 3000 ==
In the year 3000, all scientific experiments and technological advancements are carried out within the Science Dome. One area within the Science Dome is the Time Laboratory. This is where all time travel experiments are performed. Technology used in the laboratory includes the Time Capsule, and the temporal flux generators, as well as other diagnostic tools. Below follows a short list of significant technology used in the future.

Only the new technology of the Time Gate and the Sentinel is described in this article, for other technology from the year 3000 see

=== The Time Gate ===
The Time Gate is another of Bruno's inventions. It is another time-travel device. It is an energy doorway which can be used to travel through time as easily as stepping through a door. Temporal co-ordinates are entered into the Time Gate via a numerical keypad. When the co-ordinates have been input into the Time Gate, beams of energy begin to flash within the confines of the Gate getting faster until a wormhole-like portal appears. The user can then step from one time to another by walking through the Gate.

=== Sentinel ===
The sentinel is a device from the year 3000. When programmed, it will follow a person who may wish to cause harm to others, and will prevent them from causing harm. If somebody feels threatened and calls for help the sentinel will activate and fire an energy beam and the person will freeze, thus preventing them from causing possible harm. Once activated it can only be deactivated via the use of a Transducer.

== Episode list ==
| Episode | Episode Title | Summary | Original Air Date |
|---|---|---|---|
| 201 | A Time Without Vegemite | Jenny wakes up in the year 3000 and begins learning to use a Transducer. Silverthorn claims he has amnesia and everyone but Jenny believes him. As they are reviewing the data stored in the Time Capsule, it becomes clear that the past has been altered. Lorien hurries to return Jenny and Silverthorn to their respective times and Alana comes along. Silverthorn, still claiming amnesia, asks Lorien to help him find a safe place in 2500. Silverthorn tricks Lorien and Alana and steals their Transducers. | 22 September 1992 |
| 202 | The End of Everything | Jenny meets a boy named Nik in the year 2500 and learns that the entire world is controlled by a corporate named Globecorp. The leaders live in a colony on the Moon and most of the rest of the people live in horrible conditions scavenging food and water. When Silverthorn and his thugs show up to try to regain control of the Time Capsule, Jenny convinces Nik to help her defeat Silverthorn in exchange for a few cups of clean water. Meanwhile, Alana and Lorien manage to escape from Silverthorn and return to the Time Capsule. Alana and Lorien drop Jenny off in 1990 and return to the year 3000 where everything is different. | 23 September 1992 |
| 203 | The Other Alana | In the year 3000, Alana and Lorien realise the whole world is now a radioactive wasteland. They take the Capsule back to 2500 and try to determine what Silverthorn did to change the future. Lorien and Alana are captured by Globecorp police and Lorien is "modified". Alana escapes and begins wandering through 2500. Silverthorn finds P.J. and reveals that he stole the plans for the Time Gate from 3000. Alana tries to recruit Nik to help her stop Silverthorn. | 24 September 1992 |
| 204 | The Time Gate | Silverthorn has built the Time Gate and tests it as Nik and Alana watch. Nik and Alana try to report Silverthorn to GlobeCorp for theft, but are almost arrested. Silverthorn uses the Time Gate to travel back to 1990, reconnects with Eddie and has Eddie steal the limo from in front of the Kellys. Petey breaks into Silverthorn's house to try to get his toys back from the limo and sees Silverthorn and Eddie. He follows them to a warehouse full of toys. In 2500, Alana and Nik find the Time Gate at the location of Silverthorn's old house just as the GlobeCorp police arrive to arrest Silverthorn's minions. As Alana tries to disable the Time Gate, Silverthorn returns. | 25 September 1992 |
| 205 | Sucked Into the Future | Silverthorn is arrested, Alana and Nik try to open the time capsule and have a fight. Silverthorn is about to be modified when he agrees to help Draco get water. Nik stumbles upon Silverthorn's gang and agrees to help Alana. Eddie buys the toy warehouse as Petey and Jenny investigate. Silverthorn starts shipping water to the future and Petey gets caught in mid transport. Jenny goes in after him and takes PJ with her. In 2500 Nik and Alana save Jenny from Draco's men. Petey gets captured as Draco demands Silverthorn bring more water. | 29 September 1992 |
| 206 | The Grandmother of Invention | Alana, Jenny and Nik attempt to rescue Petey who has been captured by Globecorp and taken to Draco. Jenny injures herself badly while attempting to rescue Lorien. Jenny and Nik go and visit his Grandmother Maeve to tend to Jenny's wound. Jenny identifies what Maeve has created is the first Transducer and asks Maeve to borrow it so she can try and rescue Petey. Petey spies on Draco telling Silverthorn his plans to take over Globecorp. | 30 September 1992 |
| 207 | Escape from Globecorp | After speaking to Petey after Alana finds him in Draco's apartment, Alana realises that Draco's plans to destroy the peace platforms will ultimately case the great disaster. Silverthorn travels back to 1990 to try and locate nuclear weapons. Eddie believes the US Navy who happens to be docked in Sydney port may prove the answer. Draco knowing that Petey has been talking to Alana hypnotises him and gives him a special communicator to contact him when he has located the time capsule. While making their escape through the Globecorp basement to meet Jenny a guard catches them. | 1 October 1992 |
| 208 | A Chase Through Time | Alana, Jenny and Nik without knowing it are allowed to escape from Globecorp with Lorien. As the transducer prototype cannot unfreeze Lorien's mind, Alana is forced to leave her at Nik's grandmothers while they return to the time capsule. Petey uses the watch Draco gave him to alert Draco of the location of the time capsule. Draco, Silverthorn travel back to 1990 through the time gate where Draco double crosses Silverthorn. Alana, Jenny and Nik follow them and free Silverthorn after he agrees to inform them how Draco will get Nuclear weapons. On the way to the docks to stop him, Silverthorn gets them stopped by the police for careless driving. | 2 October 1992 |
| 209 | Showdown at "Eddie's Pools" | Stopped by the police, Alana uses her transducer to create a distraction allowing Silverthorn and herself to escape. Draco and his men use 2500 technology to steal the nuclear war heads in front of guards, protestors and sailors, Nik and Jenny try and to stop them taking the war heads through the time gate but are unable to. Jenny is kidnapped by Draco and Nik manages to jump through to avoid being stranded in 1990. Escaping from Draco's men Nik returns to his grandmothers and takes Lorien to the time capsule to return to 1990. Barely escaping Vance and Globe cops he manages to travel back to 1990 leaving the time capsule in a rubbish dump, he makes his way to the docks he is too late and can only watch them already leaving weapons in hand. | 6 October 1992 |
| 210 | In the Nik of Time | Returning to the warehouse Nik watches his previous self follow Jenny through the time gate, there he reunites with Alana, Eddie and Silverthorn. In 2500 Draco threatens Jenny with having Petey walk out of a high storey window unless Jenny teaches him how to use the transducer, when Petey refuses to do this they are both sent to be modified. In 1990 Alana, Eddie, Nik and Silverthorn make their way to the rubbish dump only to find the capsule being taken away by police. They all head to the Keli Deli where Alana convinces Mr Rooney to come with them to the police station to get the capsule back. They retrieve the capsule and take it to the Global and Interstellar research building which will in 2500 become Globecorp. In 2500 Jenny attempts to use PJ to stop the machine from modifying Petey. | 7 October 1992 |
| 211 | The Great Disaster Begins | Jenny realises that the PJ has stopped the modification when Petey winks at her. After taking the Time Capsule to the top of the Globecorp building in 1990 and giving a brief scene for the benefit of the building staff, Alana, Nik and Silverthorn travel to 2500 despite the capsule almost not making the journey from being damaged earlier by Draco's men. They cannot locate Jenny and are subsequently captured by Draco's guards. Silverthorn reveals a trick by Jenny and PJ to Draco allowing her to be captured as well but then turns on Draco himself. Pleading with Draco that he is starting the great disaster Alana tries to stop him blowing up the Northern hemisphere's peace platform, but he disregards her pleas. After the Peace platform is blown up a video message from an official in London reveals that the whole Northern Hemisphere is dying, proving the Great Disaster has started. As the second ship has already taken off and is on route to the Southern peace platform it looks as though the whole world will be destroyed. | 8 October 1992 |
| 212 | Kings of the Dinosaurs | Draco strikes a deal with Silverthorn to escape into the past as it seems that the second spaceship cannot be stopped. Managing to recover both the transducers from Silverthorn as he escapes she tries to use hers to send PJ onto the rocket to change its flight coordinates, but she cannot push him far enough to reach it. Not wanting to abandon her friend to die in the future and return to her time Jenny convinces Alana to try and mind link with the transducers enhancing their power and allowing PJ to reach the rocket. This is a success and PJ diverts the rocket away from the peace platform, however, PJ changing course activates the nuclear weapon and the rocket explodes with PJ frozen to it. With the fate of the planet secured Alana, Jenny and Nik try to capture Draco and Silverthorn but can only watch them walk through the time gate into the past. Expecting to arrive in 1990 both are confused as to where they are until the Children advise them they have been sent to 5 Million BC, and subsequently strand them there. Lorien is unmodified, Jenny and Petey travel back through the time gate to 1990 after everybody says an emotional goodbye. The time gate is destroyed and Alana and Lorien just manage to travel back to the year 3000 in the severely damaged time capsule. Sometime later Alana and Jenny both unable to sleep in their respective times gaze up at the Moon and say a final goodbye. | 9 October 1992 |

== Broadcast ==
Tomorrow's End was broadcast on the Nine Network in 1992, and was later shown in the United Kingdom in the Tuesday and Friday afternoons 5:10 slot on BBC1 between 13 July 1993 and 20 August 1993. It was then repeated in the Monday afternoon 16:35 slot on BBC1 between 9th January and 27th March 1995. Both seasons were also broadcast on Cable/Satellite channel, The Children's Channel.

== Novelisations ==
Both The Girl From Tomorrow and Tomorrow's End were novelized and published in the early 1990s by Mark Shirrefs and John Thomson.

In 2025, Idiot Box Books ran an unsuccessful crowd funding campaign to republish and reissue the original two books along with a new novel in the series entitled A New Tomorrow to be written by the original authors. A second crowd funded campaign was launched in February 2026, and was successfully funded in April 2026.

== Home media ==
Both The Girl from Tomorrow and The Girl from Tomorrow Part II: Tomorrow's End are also available on DVD, albeit in an edited "Telemovie" version (the whole series trimmed to movie length, halving the running time at least) and not in their original, episodic format.

A 4-disc set containing all 12 episodes of The Girl from Tomorrow was released on 18 September 2006 (Region 0) around Australia into various retail outlets via Shock Exports. A 4-disc set containing all 12 episodes of The Girl from Tomorrow Part II: Tomorrow's End is also available, released in May 2007.

All DVDs released so far have been in PAL format, and Region 0 encoded. Both series and the Telemovies are out of print.

Both seasons are available to stream on Amazon Prime Video in the UK.

== Reception ==
In a positive review, Tom Gilling of The Sydney Morning Herald praised the television series, writing, "the story mixes roughly equal parts of Asimov, Mad Max and Doctor Who, adds some amusingly rustic dialogue ... and computerised special effects to create a classy, well-acted children's drama". He praised John Howard as "a splendidly uncouth villain" and said "the director's vision of a postindustrial wasteland seemed entirely convincing". Comparing the series to The Girl from Tomorrow, The MUP Encyclopaedia of Australian Science Fiction & Fantasy praised it, writing "the sequel is visually superior to the first production, the plot is on a grander scale and the stakes are higher".

At the 1992 Australian Film Institute Awards, the televion series was nominated for AACTA Award for Best Miniseries or Telefeature. It won an ATOM Award.

== See also ==
- The Girl from Tomorrow
- List of Australian television series
