= The Four Minute Mile =

- Genre: Miniseries
- Written by: David Williamson
- Directed by: Jim Goddard
- Starring: Nique Needles; Richard Huw
- Countries of origin: Australia; United Kingdom
- Original language: English

Production
- Running time: 180 minutes (90 minutes per part)

Original release
- Network: ABC
- Release: 13 September – 14 September 1988

The Four Minute Mile is a television mini series about the race to run the four-minute mile, focusing on the rivalry between Roger Bannister and John Landy.

== Cast ==
- Nique Needles as John Landy
- Richard Huw as Roger Bannister
- John McTernan as Dave Garroway
- Adrian Rawlings as Christopher Chataway
- John Philbin as Wes Santee
- Lewis Fitz-Gerald as Denis Johansson
- Adrian Dunbar as Norris McWhirter
- Cliff Ellen as Jim Johnson
- Colleen Anne Fitzpatrick as Elva Landy
- Jane Hall as Sue Landy
- Tracy Mann as Jill Webster
- Bud Tingwell as Sandy Duncan
- Geneviève Picot as Marjorie Jackson
- Jacek Koman as Emil Zatopek
- Reg Gorman as Vancouver Journalist
- John O'May as Bill Easton
- Chuck Faulkner as American Athletics Official

== See also ==
- List of films about the sport of athletics
