= Games for Parents and Other Children =

- Written by: John Weyland
- Directed by: Ray Alchin
- Starring: John Clayton; Colleen Fitzpatrick; Vincent Ball; Garry McDonald
- Country of origin: Australia
- Original language: English

Production
- Producer: Charles Russell
- Running time: 60 mins
- Production company: ABC

Original release
- Network: ABC
- Release: 13 March 1975

Games for Parents and Other Children is a 1975 Australian TV movie.

== Premise ==
Two boys, Joe and Howie, discover their mother Maggie having an affair and run away to join the circus.

== Cast ==
- John Clayton
- Colleen Fitzpatrick
- Vincent Ball
- Garry McDonald
- Melissa Jaffer
