= A Girl's Own Story =

1984 film

- Directed by: Jane Campion
- Written by: Jane Campion
- Starring: Gabrielle Shornegg; Geraldine Haywood; Marina Knight
- Cinematography: Sally Bongers
- Edited by: Christopher Lancaster
- Release date: 1984
- Running time: 27 minutes
- Country: Australia
- Language: English

A Girl's Own Story is a 1984 short Australian drama film directed by Jane Campion. It was screened in the Un Certain Regard section at the 1986 Cannes Film Festival. The short centers on the female adolescent experience—particularly female desire—using a fragmentary approach.

== Plot ==
The film is set during the 1960s at the height of Beatlemania. It opens with schoolgirls singing a Beatles song in the courtyard of their Catholic school to the delight of their classmates, but a nun arrives to break it up. Two girls, Pam and Stella, are in a bedroom where they kiss cutouts of Beatles members that are pinned to the wall. One of the girls is wearing the cutout of her favorite Beatle as a mask to practice kissing on her friend.

This is intercut with scenes of one of the other schoolgirls, Gloria, who is at home playing a game of make-believe with her brother Graeme. Pam's home life is a scene of dysfunction due to her unfaithful father and a depressed mother. Despite the parents' marital strife, the couple ends up reconciling much to Pam's surprise.

A leitmotif of music-box notes plays intermittently throughout the film.

== Cast ==
- Gabrielle Shornegg as Pam
- Geraldine Haywood as Stella
- Marina Knight as Gloria
- John Godden as Graeme
- Joanne Gabbe as Sister
- Colleen Fitzpatrick as Mother
- Paul Chubb as Father
- Jane Edwards as Deidre
- Cynthia Turner as Nun 1
- Valda Diamond as Nun 2
- Katharine Cullen as Little Pam

== Filming ==
Nicole Kidman admitted during an interview that at 14 she was originally cast as the lead in the film but turned it down because of her reluctance to kiss a girl and wear a shower cap.

== Reception ==
A Girl's Own Story received acclaim and won the 1984 Rouben Mamoulian Award at the Sydney Fim Festival and the Best Direction Award at the Australian Film Institute. It screened in the Un Certain Regard section at the 1986 Cannes Film Festival. Filmmaker Todd Haynes said "'A Girl's Own Story' is a film of acute tenderness and beauty".

In a retrospective review, Cristina Álvarez López of Mubi wrote the film "signals concisely the fragile, liminal territory to be explored: a space between childhood and womanhood, between desire and repression, and between curiosity and trauma".
