= Katharine Cullen =

Australian actress

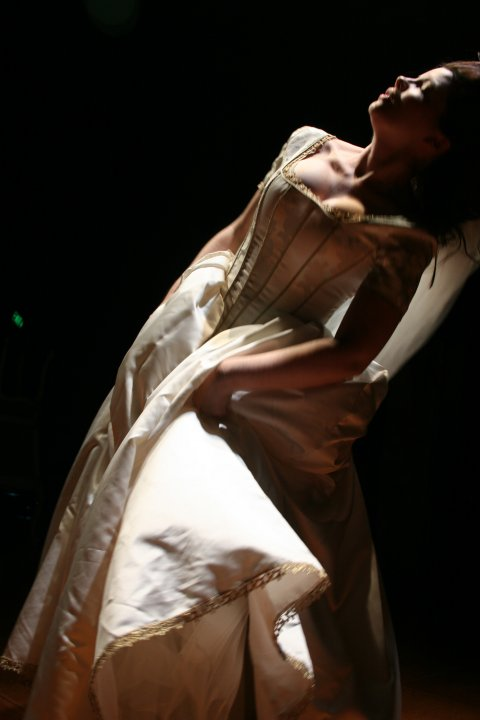
- Katharine Cullen
- Born: 9 June 1975 (age 51); Australia
- Occupation: Actress
- Years active: 1984–present
- Children: William Richards
- Family: Max Cullen (father); Colleen Anne Fitzpatrick (mother)

Katharine Cullen (born 9 June 1975) is an Australian actress, daughter of actors Max Cullen and Colleen Anne Fitzpatrick.

== Education ==
- NIDA (National Institute of Dramatic Art). Bachelor of Dramatic Art.
- The College of Fine Arts (COFA), University of New South Wales (BFA Hons, MFA)
- The Ensemble Studios. Diploma of Acting.
- The McDonald College High School of Performing Arts

== Career ==
=== Film and television ===
Cullen played a feral child in Mad Max Beyond Thunderdome directed by George Miller, Little Pam in A Girl's Own Story by Jane Campion, Frances in the internationally screened television series Hills End, and Alana, the title role in The Girl From Tomorrow and its sequel The Girl from Tomorrow Part II: Tomorrow's End, a popular sci-fi children's television series that spawned books, newsletters, fanclubs and international awards, including nominations for three (AFI) Australian Film Institute Awards.

=== Stage ===
At 24, Cullen made her professional stage debut as Vera the Sydney Opera House for the Sydney Theatre Company in A Month in the Country, directed by Lindy Davies. She later played Mrs Fainall, the daughter of Lady Wishfort, played by Miriam Margolyes, in the Sydney Theatre Company production of The Way of the World directed by Gale Edwards. She starred in Humble Boy for the Ensemble Theatre, and alongside her father, actor Max in the Ensemble Theatre production of I Ought to be in Pictures by Neil Simon. Both plays were directed by artistic director of the Ensemble, Sandra Bates, one reviewer stating, "Cullen's portrayal as the outspoken, heartbreakingly brave young girl is magnificent. Her ability to imbue her character with a sensitive mix of fragile vulnerability overlaid by outspoken confidence is remarkable."

Cullen later worked with the Sydney Theatre Company performing Brecht and for Belvoir Street Theatre as Titania in A Midsummer Night's Dream. In 2010, Cullen appeared in Chekhov's The Seagull for the Siren Theatre Company. "A special mention must go to Katharine Cullen's Masha, whose unrequited passion for Konstantin brings about some of the funniest and saddest scenes... Cullen's vodka-soaked rant inspired well deserved spontaneous applause." In late 2010, for the Ensemble Theatre Cullen played Grace in Between Us, and also for The Ensemble played Kyra in David Hare’s Skylight during July 2012.

== Filmography ==
=== Film ===
Year	Title	Role	Type
1984	A Girl's Own Story	Little Pam	Short film
1984	Mad Max Beyond Thunderdome	Gatherer	Feature film
1988	Hills End	Frances	TV movie
1992	The Girl from Tomorrow	Alana	TV movie

=== Television ===
Year	Title	Role	Type
1990–92	The Girl from Tomorrow	Alana	TV series, seasons 1–2, 24 episodes
1997	The Adventures of Sam	Min / Pelau (voices)	Animated TV series, 2 episodes
1998	House Gang	Jenny	TV series, season 2, episode 4: "Moving Out"
2001	Tracey McBean		Animated TV series
2008	The Making of Australia by Baz Luhrmann	Voiceover	Video

== Theatre ==
Year	Title	Role	Type
1998	Black Comedy	Miss Furnival	Ensemble Theatre
1998	Five Women Wearing the Same Dress	Lindy	Ensemble Theatre
1999	Toxic Girls	Madeline	Ensemble Theatre
1999	The Importance of Being Earnest	Cecily Cardew	Ensemble Theatre
1999	A Day in the Death of Joe Egg	Sheila	Ensemble Theatre
2000	A Month in the Country	Vera	Sydney Opera House with STC
2001	I Ought to Be in Pictures	Libby	Ensemble Theatre
2002	The Vagina Monologues		Adrian Bohm Presents
2003	The Way of the World	Mrs Fainall	Sydney Opera House with STC
2004	Humble Boy	Rosie Pye	Ensemble Theatre
2007	Our Country’s Good	Liz Morden	NIDA
2007	Mademoiselle Y		
	The Stronger		NIDA
2007	The Private Life of the Master Race	Cabaret Singer & Dancer	NIDA
2007	Julius Caesar	Mark Antony	NIDA
2007	The Wood Demon (early draft of Uncle Vanya)	Sonya	NIDA
2008	Wet and Dry	Pam	NIDA
2008	Days of Significance	Clare	NIDA
2008	Love for Love	Mrs Frail	NIDA
2008	Gallipoli		STC
2009	Dirtyland / Return to Earth	Anya / Jeanie	Theatre Royal, Hobart with Australian National Play Festival
2009	Mother Courage / Caucasian Chalk Circle	Kattrin / Grusha	STC
2009	Summerfolk	Varya	Belvoir Street Theatre workshop
2009	A Midsummer Night's Dream	Hippolyta / Titania	Belvoir Street Theatre with B Sharp
2010	The Seagull	Masha	Siren Theatre Company
2012	Between Us	Grace	Ensemble Theatre
2012	Skylight	Kyra	Ensemble Theatre

=== As director ===
Year	Title	Role	Type
2012	The New Electric Ballroom	Assistant Director	Stables Theatre with Griffin Theatre Company

== TVC ==
Year	Client	Notes	Ref
2001	David Jones		
2002	Lay's Chips		
2009	Heineken	America only	
2010	NRMA	Radical Media	
