= The Adventures of Sam =

Australian animation serial

- Genre: Children's; Drama; Action; Adventure
- Written by: Ken Kelso
- Directed by: Craig Handley; George Whaley
- Starring: Justin Rosniak; Emma Jane Fowler; Michael Craig; Lewis Fitz-Gerald; Sam Wilcox; Keith Buckley; Walter Grkovic; Anthony Wong; David Mackennal; Bob Baines; Joy Hopwood; Noeline Brown; Penne Hackforth-Jones; Katharine Cullen; Scott McGregor; Ace Matters; Graham Matters; David Downer; John Sheerin; Stephen Shanahan; Jon Pollard; Paul Smyth; David Whitney; John Derum; Diana McLean; Rachel King; Mitch Matthews; Colin Lee; Lee Perry
- Theme music composer: Nerida Tyson-Chew
- Country of origin: Australia
- Original language: English
- No. of seasons: 1
- No. of episodes: 13

Production
- Executive producers: Ron Saunders; Claire Henderson
- Producers: Noel Price; Peter Jackson
- Running time: 24 minutes
- Production companies: Australian Film Finance Corporation; Southern Star Entertainment

Original release
- Network: ABC TV
- Release: 29 January – 23 April 1999

The Adventures of Sam is an Australian children's animated television series, written by Ken Kelso, that aired on the ABC in 1999.

The series ran for 13 episodes and is produced by the Australian Film Finance Corporation and Southern Star Entertainment in association with the ABC. It was also well known for its theme music by Nerida Tyson-Chew which was nominated for several awards. The series was also released on three videos in 1999 by PolyGram Video each containing four episodes featuring all episodes except for the final episode "Begin Again". It also aired on Toon Disney and The Disney Channel in the United Kingdom, TV2 in New Zealand, Kids Central in Singapore, Arutz HaYeladim in Israel, K-T.V. World in South Africa, France 5 in France, Disney Channel in Malaysia and RTÉ2 in Ireland being shown on the long running children's block The Den.

== Premise ==
Set in 1840, it follows a sea-faring boy named Sam Donahue as he goes on many adventures around the world while trying to find his brother Tom and discovers new worlds and different cultures.

== Voice cast ==
Actor	Role	Episodes
Justin Rosniak	Sam Donahue	11 episodes
Emma Jane Fowler	Bridie Branscombe	2 episodes
Lewis Fitz-Gerald	Captain Billy Branscombe	2 episodes
Katharine Cullen	Min / Pelau	2 episodes
Penne Hackforth-Jones	The Dragon Empress	1 episode
Michael Craig		1 episode
Keith Alexander (as Keith Buckley)		2 episodes
Sam Wilcox		2 episodes
Walter Grkovic		1 episode
Anthony Wong		1 episode
David Mackennal		2 episodes
Bob Baines		1 episode
Joy Hopwood		1 episode
Noeline Brown		1 episode
Scott McGregor		2 episodes
Ace Matters		1 episode
Graham Matters		2 episodes
David Downer		1 episode
John Sheerin		1 episode
Stephen Shanahan		2 episodes
Jon Pollard		2 episodes
Paul Smyth		2 episodes
David Whitney		1 episode
John Derum		1 episode
Diana McLean		2 episodes
Rachel King		2 episodes
Mitch Matthews		1 episode
Colin Lee		1 episode
Lee Perry		Episode: "Moon Daughter"

== Episode listing ==
1. Escape (29 January 1999)
2. Moon Daughter (5 February 1999)
3. The Forbidden City (12 February 1999)
4. Fire on the Water (19 February 1999)
5. Sea Raiders (26 February 1999)
6. Jungle Ghost (5 March 1999)
7. The Sultan's Palace (12 March 1999)
8. The Queen's Move (19 March 1999)
9. Castaway (26 March 1999)
10. A Strange Reunion (2 April 1999)
11. Not Quite Paradise (9 April 1999) (Note: This episode was nominated for Best Children's Television Program at the AFI Awards in 1999)
12. My Brother's Keeper (16 April 1999)
13. Begin Again (23 April 1999) (Note: Final episode and the only one that was never released on home video in Australia)

== Home media ==
=== Video releases ===
==== Australia ====
Release name	Release date	Classifaction	Publisher	Format	Language	Subtitles	Notes	REF
Adventures of Sam Vol 01	17 February 1999	G	Polygram Video	PAL	English	None	Includes episodes 1 - 4	
Adventures of Sam Vol 02	17 March 1999	G	Polygram Video	PAL	English	None	Includes episodes 5 - 8	
Adventures of Sam Vol 03	16 April 1999	G	Polygram Video	PAL	English	None	Includes episodes 9 - 12	

=== DVD releases ===
==== Italy ====
Release name	Release date	Publisher	Format	Language	Subtitles	Notes	REF
Le Avventure Di Sam	1 December 2008	Digivision	PAL	English, Italian	None	Includes episodes 1 - 4 combined, with only a single opening and ending sequence.	
Le Avventure Di Sam 2	1 December 2008	Digivision	PAL	English, Italian	None	Includes episodes 5 - 8 combined, with only a single opening and ending sequence.	
Le Avventure Di Sam 3	1 December 2008	Digivision	PAL	English, Italian	None	Includes episodes 9 - 13 combined, with only a single opening and ending sequence.	
