= Monty Wedd =

Monty Wedd OAM
- Born: Montague Thomas Archibald Wedd; 5 January 1921; Glebe, New South Wales, Australia
- Died: 4 May 2012 (aged 90); Fingal Bay, New South Wales, Australia
- Occupations: Cartoonist, animator, author
- Writing career
- Period: 1935–1995

Montague Thomas Archibald Wedd OAM (5 January 1921 – 4 May 2012) was an Australian comic artist, animator and author.

== Biography ==
Wedd was born in Glebe, New South Wales on 5 January 1921. As a school boy he was instructed in art by Oswald Brock. He left high school during the Great Depression and worked as a junior poster artist at Hackett Offset Printing Company before becoming a designer and illustrator for a furniture manufacturer, Corkhill & Lang (later Frazer's Furniture). During this time he continued studying commercial art at night at East Sydney Technical College. He then worked as a furniture artist and salesman at Grace Bros before joining the armed forces in 1941, where he served in the Australian Army, First Artillery Survey Regiment, and then the Royal Australian Air Force, where he attained the rank of Leading Aircraftman (34 Squadron).

After the war he spent three years studying under the Commonwealth Reconstruction Training Scheme, completing his arts course at East Sydney Technical College, during which time he produced his first comic strip, Sword and Sabre, a story about the French Foreign Legion. Wedd sold it to Syd Nicholls' publishing company, where it appeared as three monthly episodes in the Middy Malone magazine. Wedd also produced eight more comic strips for Nicholls, including Bert and Ned and Captain Justice (a bushranger who righted wrongs). After Nicholls closed his comic line, Wedd began supplying comics to Elmsdale Publications, including Tod Trail and Kirk Raven. In December 1950 New Century Press contracted Wedd to produce twenty three Captain Justice stories, with the hero now located in the American Wild West, for £102 per issue.

The only reason we had him over in America was because it was the vogue of the time. Everyone was interested in American westerns. They absolutely flooded the Australian market with western comics. Nobody was interested in Australian Wild West stories. They weren't interested in anything to do with bushrangers.

— Monty Wedd

Throughout the 1950s Wedd also worked extensively as a cover artist on numerous 'pulp fiction' novels published by Malian Press, Action Comics Pty Ltd and Whitman Press.

In 1954 he returned to Emsadle where he created The Scorpion, for which he was paid £160 per issue. It became a best-seller with sales of up to 100,000 per issue, despite being banned in Queensland, apparently on the grounds that the bad-guy protagonist kept escaping his just deserts to fight another day.

The authorities objected to the Scorpion not being brought to justice, but if he had been I wouldn't have had a series. Still, once they banned him in one state the distributor was no longer keen to handle the title at all, so that was the end of The Scorpion.

— Monty Wedd

He then produced a series of Captain Justice stories for Calvert Publications, but they had to be largely re-drawn to satisfy 1950s censorship rules and regulations, e.g. the hero's face could not be entirely hidden, no flashes could issue from guns, no character could carry an offensive weapon in the hand, and no-one was allowed to be killed. He also wrote and illustrated eight books for Calvert about a war-time American, Kent Blake of the Secret Service. Wedd then created strips for Stamp News (on the history of the stamp) and for Dr T.S. Hepworth's Australian Children's Newspaper, drawing many full page adventure comics, an association which lasted for sixteen years. From 1958 he was a regular contributor to Chuckler's Weekly and for Telegraph Newspapers, with Captain Justice and King Comet.

After producing another five Captain Justice stories for Horwitz Publications in 1963, Wedd turned to animation, working for Artransa and Eric Porter on series such as Marco Polo Junior Versus the Red Dragon, Charlie Chan, The Lone Ranger, Rocket Robin Hood and Super Friends. Captain Justice appeared in the Woman's Day magazine in September 1964, where it ran until April 1965.

From 1965 through to 1966 Wedd produced the cartoon mascot 'Dollar Bill', which appeared in a series of educational cartoons for the Decimal Currency Board, as part of the public information campaign about Australia's switch to decimal currency in 1966.

On leaving the animation field Wedd concentrated on freelance work and production of a new comic strip based on the life of Ned Kelly. Wedd was in great demand during Captain Cook's Bicentenary celebrations, creating historic strips, illustrations and cards for everything from TV series to Minties and washing powder between 1969 and 1970. The original plans for Ned Kelly were to run it for 25–30 weeks, but Wedd approached the Sunday Mirror with a proposal to produce a detailed examination of Kelly's life on an open-ended basis. The strip ran uninterrupted for two years. Wedd retired from comics in July 1977, after working on the Ned Kelly comic strip for 146 weeks.

They had been going to run Captain Justice but they told me Rupert Murdoch had invested a lot of money in the Ned Kelly movie so they wanted a cartoon about Ned Kelly. I did a 140-episode true life story of Ned Kelly and then I followed that up with Bold Ben Hall.

— Monty Wedd

Replacing Ned Kelly was another Wedd strip about bushrangers, Bold Ben Hall, which followed the same approach and format, running for 400 episodes. This was subsequently followed with another equally long running strip, The Birth of a Nation, devised to coincide with Australia's bicentennial celebrations in 1988. The strip was syndicated to several newspapers, and was later issued as a two-volume book, The Making of a Nation, (self-published by Wedd) in 1988.

Wedd's work has appeared in a range of Australian newspapers, including Sydney Daily Mirror, Sunday Telegraph, The Sunday Territorian and Sunday Mail.

Wedd was a long time member and former vice-president of the Black and White Artists' Club, and lived at Williamtown, New South Wales. In 1993 he was awarded the Medal of the Order of Australia for his services as author, illustrator and historian. He won Stanley Awards in 1987 and 1989. In 2004 he received the Jim Russell Award for "significant contribution" to the cartooning industry from the Australian Cartoonists Association.

=== Personal ===
Wedd married Dorothy and they had four children, more than 20 grandchildren and four great-grandchildren. In 1960 the couple founded a museum dedicated to the Australian military at their home at Narraweena, on Sydney's northern beaches. When they ran out of space it was moved and rebuilt at their property in Williamtown. The Monarch Historical Museum re-opened at its current location in November 1988. Wedd died on 4 May 2012 at a nursing home in Fingal Bay.

== Bibliography ==
- Wedd, Monty (1969). Stamp Oddities. Dubbo, NSW: Review Publications.
- Wedd, Monty (1970). Stamp Stories. Dubbo, NSW: Review Publications.
- Wedd, Monty (1982). Australian Military Uniforms, 1800–1982. Kenthurst, NSW: Kangaroo Press. ISBN 0-949924-12-1.
- Wedd, Monty (1988). The Making of a Nation : commemorating Australia's Bicentenary : Volume 1 - Discovery & settlement. Williamtown, NSW: Wedd Historical Productions. ISBN 0-7316-4706-8.
- Wedd, Monty (1990). The Making of a Nation : commemorating Australia's Bicentenary : Volume 2 - Exploration & rebellion. Williamtown, NSW: Wedd Historical Productions. ISBN 0-6460-1528-1.
- Wedd, Monty (2014). Ned Kelly, Narrated and Illustrated by Monty Wedd. Margate Beach, Qld: Comicoz. ISBN 978-0-9806535-1-9.
