= The Girl from Tomorrow =

Australian children's television series

- The Girl From Tomorrow's title screen.
- Also known as: Girl From Tomorrow
- Genre: Sci-fi/time travel/adventure/children's/action
- Created by: Mark Shirrefs; John Thomson; Kathy Mueller
- Written by: Mark Shirrefs; John Thomson
- Directed by: Kathy Mueller
- Starring: Katharine Cullen; Melissa Marshall; John Howard; Helen O'Connor; Andrew Clarke; James Findlay; Miles Buchanan; Helen Jones
- Theme music composer: Ian Davidson
- Composer: Ian Davidson
- Country of origin: Australia
- Original language: English
- No. of seasons: 2
- No. of episodes: 24

Production
- Executive producer: Ron Saunders
- Producer: Noel Price
- Camera setup: Single-camera
- Running time: 23–24 minutes
- Production companies: Film Australia; Nine Network Australia

Original release
- Network: Nine Network
- Release: 29 October 1990 – 9 October 1992

Related
- The Girl from Tomorrow Part II: Tomorrow's End

The Girl from Tomorrow is an Australian sci-fi children's television series produced by Film Australia. The series is based around Alana (Katharine Cullen), a girl from the year 3000. At the start of the series, she is kidnapped by Silverthorn, a criminal from the year 2500, and brought back in time to the year 1990.

While in the year 1990, she befriends Jenny (Melissa Marshall), who helps Alana adapt to life in a time unfamiliar to her, and later helps her to return to her own time.

The series' second installment, The Girl from Tomorrow Part II: Tomorrow's End aired in 1992.

== Premise ==
In the year 3000, the human race is in a state of Utopia. The major challenge facing them is continuing to rebuild the Earth after "The Great Disaster", a catastrophic event that took place in 2500 and nearly destroyed the entire Earth.

In order to investigate its causes, the scientist Tulista is sent to the past using the Time Capsule, a device created by a fellow scientist named Bruno. Upon the capsule's return, Tulista is held hostage by a criminal from 2500 named Silverthorn, who is intent on conquering the future. Silverthorn realises that even though the year 3000 has no weapons per se, his own weapons are no match to the superior technology of the Transducer. He manages to take Tulista's student Alana hostage, and escapes into the past where he figures he will have a better chance. Arriving in 1990, Alana escapes and later meets a teenager named Jenny Kelly, whose help she enlists in order to get back to the Capsule before it automatically returns to the future and leaves her stranded in the past. After thinking that the Capsule was destroyed, Jenny and Alana discover that it has been seized by Silverthorn, who is building his power and making vast amounts of money by using information from the Capsule's database, and will therefore expel Alana to use it to return to her own time. Along with the help of Jenny's family and her teacher, Alana and Jenny must devise a plan to retrieve the Capsule while foiling Silverthorn's plans, so that Alana can return home to the year 3000.

== Characters ==
=== Alana ===
Alana (Katharine Cullen) is a fourteen-year-old girl from the year 3000. Alana's parents live on Titan, Saturn's moon. They sent her to Earth to be educated. On Earth, she has guardians who teach her how to use the Transducer, so she can achieve her ambition of becoming a healer. Alana has three distinctive dots on the side of her face in the temple area. These dots signify that she is mature enough to use a Transducer. Taken in by the Kellys on arriving in 1990, Alana is given the name 'Alana Turner' and passed off as Irene's niece to avoid suspicion.

=== Silverthorn ===
Silverthorn (John Howard) is a villain from the year 2500. Silverthorn's most noticeable traits are his deviousness and tendencies of violence. He can be very charming, but this is a front so he can double-cross people. He is also extremely brave, risking his life to save a drowning boy in order to gain Lorien's trust, and tests the Time Gate on himself when none of his cronies are willing. He kidnaps Alana and flees to 1990, where he hopes he can rule the world. While in 1990, Silverthorn makes himself a millionaire by accessing the Time Capsule's computer, finding out details of local horse races, then successfully betting on the winners - buying such luxuries as a large white stretch limousine (driven by Eddie) and a large house, as well as setting up a business called Futures Incorporated as a front for his devious plans. However, Silverthorn has an inoperable brain tumour as a result of being exposed to high levels of radiation in his own time period, occasionally suffering severe headaches that can cause him to collapse, and cannot obtain further supplies of the pills he brought with him from 2500 as they contain elements and minerals which have not yet been discovered. He has only one hope of survival - Alana and the Transducer...

=== Eddie ===
Eddie (Miles Buchanan) is a young street tough who acts as Silverthorn's chauffeur and henchman. He isn't very bright and occasionally even clumsy, as a result of which Silverthorn gets angry with him, but is tolerated by his employer just so long as he is useful. In The Girl from Tomorrow Part II: Tomorrow's End, Eddie confesses that he doesn't have a driving licence.

=== Jenny Kelly ===
Jenny (Melissa Marshall) is from 1990. She is a typical teenager going through her rebellious phase. She has dyed her hair purple and plays the drums, she has aspirations of joining a band. When she's not at school she helps out in her mum's deli. Jenny hates living in Sydney, but when Alana arrives things start to get interesting.

=== Petey Kelly ===
Petey (James Findlay) is like any other nine-year-old boy from 1990. He is the brother of Jenny. He enjoys dressing up in his home-made superhero outfit, and calls himself "Captain Zero". Petey also has a great love of sci-fi, which comes in handy when things get tough.

=== Irene Kelly ===
Irene (Helen O'Connor) is Jenny and Petey's mother. She is the owner of the Kelly Deli. Like most mums, she is very protective of her children, so much so that she is more than willing to stand up to Silverthorn alone in order to protect them.

=== James Rooney ===
James (Andrew Clarke) is the science teacher at the high school Jenny attends. Irene fell for him when she met him after enrolling Alana there. James helped all the others in their efforts to retrieve the Capsule so Alana could return home.

== Technology in the year 2500 ==
The most often used weapon in use in the year 2500 is the laser pistol. When the pistol is used, the trigger is held allowing energy to build up within the object and once the trigger is released the energy within the object causes it to explode.

== Technology in the year 3000 ==
In the year 3000, all scientific experiments and technological advancements are carried out within the Science Dome. One area within the Science Dome is the Time Laboratory. This is where all time travel experiments are performed. Technology used in the laboratory includes the Time Capsule, and the temporal flux generators, as well as other diagnostic tools. Below follows a short list of significant technology used in the future.

=== The Time Capsule ===
The Time Capsule is a time exploration vehicle. It was invented by a scientist named Bruno in the year 3000. The Capsule is exactly 1.7 m (5 ft 7 in) in height and width. Its composition in the series is unspecified, but as a real prop, it is a dark green steel frame model of a Rhombicuboctahedron plated with semidiagonal steel bars and plated with semitransparent plexiglas from the inside, except on the front side which is completely transparent. Inside is a command place for one passenger, although the vehicle can accept several people. It stands on a 20 cm tall black base. Its front sides are capable of opening like a two-sided door. The Capsule is equipped with the most advanced computer system available in the future. The history and knowledge from before The Great Disaster is held within its memory banks. The command panel is represented by a green prism in the centre of the vehicle, which communicates with the upper control panel, situated below the topmost side. In the second season, a security device is added - a hexagonal plate palm scanner, right from the front side. The Capsule is equipped with survival mechanisms capable of synthesizing water and protein nutrients from the atmosphere.

Bruno invented the Time Capsule so that people in the year 3000 could investigate the causes of The Great Disaster, a terrible event that almost destroyed the entire Earth. The Capsule's computer also responds to verbal commands. When the Time Capsule is programmed with a set of temporal co-ordinates it draws energy from the temporal flux generators and begins to spin slowly at first and then gathering speed, which is followed by two sounds: a saw wave sound gradually increasing in frequency and a looping sequence (sound that exponentially grows in frequency and then falls low again) increasing in frequency, too. Soon when the part of the energy is transferred from the generators to the Capsule, a blue sparkled energy field then forms around the Capsule. Its sides begin to vibrate in light, followed by a slightly yellow glow in the centre of the vehicle. When the energy is sufficient, the vehicle explodes out of its present time in a flash of light and rain of yellow sparks, and explodes into the time set by the co-ordinates, which is followed by the same sawtooth sound, only with decreasing frequency, hence giving the impression of a cooling process. Upon arrival, the Capsule is regularly covered with soot residue. The Time Capsule will only remain in the past for twenty-eight days unless specified differently.

=== Personal Computer Companion ===
In the year 3000, everybody owns a Computer Companion. It is a miniaturised computer that can be worn on the wrist. The computer is programmed with an artificial intelligence. These computers are capable of a variety of actions. Mostly they are used to tell the time and give advice to the wearer, and they can also record and play holograms. The Companions worn by children also teach manners to the wearer as they will not comply with commands if there is any insincerity in the voice, and only respond when asked politely. The advanced technology contained in the computer enables it to interface with other computers and any other electronic devices.

=== The Transducer ===
The Transducer is a tool that is used by everyone in the year 3000. Alana was only learning to use the Transducer when she was kidnapped by Silverthorn. The Transducer looks like a headband with a crystal in the centre of a black drop-like plate. The Transducer from the year 3000 has several colours of radiation. Blue is used when the carrier tries to levitate objects, pink for healing, purple for specific interactions with other force fields, and red radiation forms as a result of strong feelings (intentional or unintentional) which destroy matter. The first transducer uses white radiation.

The Transducer was invented in the year 2500 by a woman named Maeve. She invented it to be a tool of healing. After The Great Disaster occurred in the year 2500, the Transducer was mass-produced and the people were taught how to use it. It was to be used as a tool to rebuild the planet. A replica of the original Transducer is held in the Science Dome in the year 3000. The Transducer functions by enhancing and magnifying the telepathic function of the pituitary gland, by doing this the user is able to levitate objects and heal wounds. If used in the wrong way the Transducer can be used as a weapon to destroy things; this is why the people of the year 3000 are taught from an early age to control their emotions.

== Episode list ==
No. overall	No. in season	Title	Directed by	Written by	Original release date
1	1	"Future Shock"	Kathy Mueller	Mark Shirrefs, John Thomson	29 October 1990
Alana, a girl from the year 3000, accidentally ends up in the year 1990, after an experiment with a time machine has gone wrong. Jenny Kelly, a girl, who lives in 1990, befriends her and gives the bewildered Alana a place to hide.
2	2	"A Primitive and Dangerous Time"	Kathy Mueller	Mark Shirrefs, John Thomson	30 October 1990
Alana finds herself completely lost in a world she doesn't know. In order to survive and get back to her time capsule, she runs into several dangerous situations and meets a girl named Jenny Kelly.
3	3	"Sanctuary"	Kathy Mueller	Mark Shirrefs, John Thomson	31 October 1990
While Alana tries to save her capsule she runs into some serious danger, so Jenny has her hands full to take care of Alana. If that wouldn't be enough for Jenny, she runs into more drama at home, with her alien obsessed brother and her exhausted mother.
4	4	"Sweetness and Fright"	Kathy Mueller	Mark Shirrefs, John Thomson	1 November 1990
Irene has come up with a plan for Alana: she has to go to school with Jenny. There Alana has even more trouble fitting in. However that's not the only problem Alana has as she soon gets sick. A familiar face shows up and Alana doesn't know what to do.
5	5	"Don't Tell Mum"	Kathy Mueller	Mark Shirrefs, John Thomson	5 November 1990
Silverthorn has kidnapped Alana. Jenny tries to find a way to save her. Silverthorn wants to team up with Alana to control the world, will she be able to resist him?
6	6	"Computer Games"	Kathy Mueller	Mark Shirrefs, John Thomson	6 November 1990
The girls are in trouble as their teacher, Mr. Rooney, catches them hacking into the police computer. Despite that incident, Alana and Jenny manage to find Silverthorn's office. Not only there, but also at home, further trouble awaits the girls.
7	7	"Stake-out"	Kathy Mueller	Mark Shirrefs, John Thomson	7 November 1990
The kids try to find Silverthorn's home in order to find Alana's time capsule.
8	8	"Newsprobe"	Kathy Mueller	Mark Shirrefs, John Thomson	8 November 1990
Barely managing to escape Silverthorn, Alana must go public to stop Silverthorn's plans. However Silverthorn has plans of his own.
9	9	"Truth and Lies"	Kathy Mueller	Mark Shirrefs, John Thomson	12 November 1990
The news story back fires when Alana goes to do a second interview and the transducer doesn't work.
10	10	"Betrayed"	Kathy Mueller	Mark Shirrefs, John Thomson	13 November 1990
Silverthorn tries to convince Alana that he will let her go home, when she heals him. Meanwhile, Jenny tries to find Alana.
11	11	"Captain Zero Strikes Again"	Kathy Mueller	Mark Shirrefs, John Thomson	14 November 1990
With Alana's PJ as proof, Jenny gets James and Irene to help her rescue Alana and the time capsule.
12	12	"Last Stand at Kelly Deli"	Kathy Mueller	Mark Shirrefs, John Thomson	15 November 1990
The family prepares for Alana to return home just as Silverthorn and Eddie arrive to try to recapture the capsule. Having avoided capture, Petey helps his family escape allowing Alana to confront Silverthorn in front of the capsule. Using her Transducer, Alana turns Silverthorn's force fields against him, rendering him unconscious – but also injuring Jenny. Jenny is paralysed and the only way to save her is over a thousand years in the future. Alana Jenny and Silverthorn return to the year 3000.

== Telecast and home media ==
In the United Kingdom, the series originally aired on BBC1 in the Friday afternoon CBBC 5:10 slot between 3rd May and 19th July 1991. It was then repeated in an early Saturday morning 8:10 slot between 24th April and 10th July 1993 ahead of the second series, The Girl from Tomorrow Part II: Tomorrow's End being shown. Both seasons were also broadcast on Cable/Satellite channel, The Children's Channel.

The series aired in Ireland along with its series' second installment, The Girl from Tomorrow Part II: Tomorrow's End, on RTÉ Two from 26 February 1991 until 1995. Many years later, the series was brought to the U.S. by Retro Television Network.

A four-disc DVD set containing all 12 episodes of The Girl from Tomorrow was released on 18 September 2006 (Region 0) around Australia into various retail outlets via Shock Exports. The entire series of The Girl from Tomorrow Part II: Tomorrow's End was released on 4 May 2007. All DVDs released so far have been in PAL format, and Region 0 encoded. Both series are out of print.

The series is available for streaming over iTunes.

Currently, the series can be seen on Amazon Prime and Google Play, but only for the United Kingdom in addition to being available on YouTube. Most episodes have been added for free on Tubi.

== Novelisations ==
Both The Girl From Tomorrow and Tomorrow's End were novelized and published in the early 1990s by Mark Shirrefs and John Thomson.

In 2025, Idiot Box Books ran an unsuccessful crowd funding campaign to republish and reissue the original two books along with a new novel in the series entitled A New Tomorrow to be written by the original authors. A second crowd funded campaign was launched in February 2026, and was successfully funded in April 2026.

== Awards ==
The series was a finalist in the Youth Series category in the 1990 New York Film & TV Festival. The movie version received the following awards:

- 1990 Cairo International Film Festival For Children: Golden Cairo Award for Best Film
- 1990 Festival International March de l'audiovisuel et programme jeunesse: Award for Best Drama
- 1991 Houston Film Festival: Bronze Award

== See also ==
- List of Australian television series
- Guest from the Future – a Soviet sci-fi mini-series with similar premise, which predates the Australian series
- Návštěvníci (TV series) – a Czechoslovak sci-fi television series along similar lines, which even predates the Soviet series
