= Midnite Spares =

- VHS cover
- Directed by: Quentin Masters
- Screenplay by: Terry Larsen
- Story by: John Fitzpatrick
- Produced by: Tom Burstall
- Starring: Gia Carides; James Laurie; John Clayton; Max Cullen; Graeme Blundell; Tony Barry; Bruce Spence; David Argue; Jonathan Coleman
- Cinematography: Geoff Burton
- Edited by: Andrew Prowse
- Music by: Cameron Allan
- Production company: Filmco
- Distributed by: Roadshow Films
- Release date: 1983
- Running time: 87 minutes
- Country: Australia
- Language: English
- Budget: A$2.6 million
- Box office: A$417,000 (Australia)

Midnite Spares is a 1983 Australian action film starring Gia Carides, James Laurie, Max Cullen, Graeme Blundell, Bruce Spence, David Argue and Jonathan Coleman.

== Plot ==
Steve Hall (James Laurie) is a young sprintcar driver from Toowoomba who has returned home to Sydney to team up with his dad Ted and his business partner Tomas (Max Cullen) in their towing and panel beating business "T&T Towing", as well as to team up with his dad who is also a Sprintcar driver at the local speedway. He arrives to find his dad has mysteriously disappeared and Tomas is being pressured to be part of an illegal "chop shop" ring.

After continuing to resist joining the ring, Tomas is set up and painfully discovers (having his arm broken by a tyre iron) the group of car thieves involved in "midnite spares" (the stealing and chopping of cars to send interstate) were responsible for Ted's untimely death. The thieves are headed by bent Police Detective Howard (Tony Barry) and dodgy businessmen Vincent (John Clayton) and Sidebottom (Graeme Blundell). Steve and Tomas' tow truck drivers Wimpy (Bruce Spence), Rabbit (David Argue), and their friends pursue the criminals and attempt to capture them, following Tomas' advice to Steve "Don't get angry son, get even."

Steve also meets and falls in love with Ruth Mintos (Gia Carides) and the pair have to convince her old fashioned mother Maria (Tessa Mallos) as well as her Uncle Harry (Terry Camilleri) that they want to be together and get married. Steve also tries to prove his prowess at the wheel of a sprintcar at Sydney's Parramatta City Raceway against Sydney and Australia's leading drivers including Garry Rush, George Tatnell, Rob Worthington (who also doubled as Steve when racing), Terry Becker, Bob Blacklaw and Steve Brazier.

== Cast ==
- James Laurie as Steve Hall
- Max Cullen as Tomas
- David Argue as Rabbit
- Bruce Spence as Wimpy
- Gia Carides as Ruth Mintos
- Jonathan Coleman as Wayne Grubb
- John Clayton as Vincent
- Terry Camilleri as Harry Diaz
- Graeme Blundell as Sidebottom
- John Godden as Chris the Rat
- Amanda Dole as Janelle Clapton
- Ray Marshall as Detective Panton
- Tessa Mallos as Maria Mintos
- Moya O'Sullivan as Caravan Lady

== Production ==
During shooting, camera operator David Brostoff was killed in an accident at the Parramatta City Raceway.
