= Ron Elisha =

Australian playwright and general practitioner (born 1951)

- Native name: רון אלישע
- Born: 1951 (age 74–75) Jerusalem
- Occupation: Playwright, writer, general practitioner
- Education: University of Melbourne (MBBS)
- Genre: Drama, theatre, screenwriting, children's literature
- Years active: 1979–present
- Notable works: In Duty Bound; Einstein; The Goldberg Variations; Anne Being Frank
- Notable awards: Australian Writers' Guild Awards (4 wins, incl. Major Award 1982)

Ron Elisha (Hebrew: רון אלישע; born 1951) is an Israeli-born Australian playwright, writer and general practitioner.

Born in Jerusalem Ron Elisha's family moved to Melbourne, Australia in 1953. In 1975 he graduated in Medicine from Melbourne University and practised as a GP until his retirement in 2016.

His first play, In Duty Bound was staged by the Melbourne Theatre Company in 1979, with Ray Lawler in one of the lead roles - his first return to the stage since his appearance in his own "Summer Of The Seventeenth Doll".

Since then he has written well over 500 full-length plays and screenplays, two children's books and dozens of articles for a variety of publications.

He has won four Australian Writers' Guild Awards, including the Major Award in 1982 for his 1981 play Einstein, and has been shortlisted for the AWGIE 13 times in toto.

His plays have also been shortlisted for multiple awards throughout Australia, Europe and the US, his work having been produced throughout Australia, New Zealand, United States, United Kingdom, Canada, Poland, Israel France, Belgium, Italy, Lithuania, Latvia, Estonia, Russia and Hungary.

== Bibliography ==
Drama

- In Duty Bound. (Yackandandah, 1983) ISBN 0-86805-019-9
- Two. (Currency, 1985) ISBN 0-86819-125-6
- Einstein. (Penguin/Yackandandah, 1986) ISBN 0-14-048210-5
- The Levine comedy. (Yackandandah, 1987) ISBN 0-86805-064-4
- Safe House. (Currency Press, 1989) ISBN 0-86819-247-3
- Esterhaz. (Currency Press, 1990) ISBN 0-86819-275-9
- Pax Americana. (Yackandandah, 1990) ISBN 0-86805-072-5
- Choice. (Currency Press, 1994) ISBN 0-86819-396-8
- The Goldberg Variations. (Currency Press, 2000) ISBN 0-86819-622-3
- A Tree, Falling (Australian Script Centre, 2003, online)
- Wrongful Life (Australian Script Centre, 2005, online)
- Controlled Crying (Australian Script Centre, 2006, online)
- Renaissance (Australian Script Centre, 2006, online)
- The Schelling Point (Australian Script Centre, 2010, online)
- "Man In The Middle" (Australian Script Centre, 2012, online)
- "Love Field" (Australian Script Centre, 2013, online)
- "The Soul Of Wittgenstein" 2016 (Australian Script Centre, 2016, online)
- "Certificate Of Life" 2017 (Australian Script Centre, 2017, online)
- "Window" 2017 (Australian Script Centre, 2018, online)
- "Unsolicited Male" 2018 (Australian Script Centre, 2019, online)
- "I Really Don't Care" 2019 (Australian Script Centre, 2019, online)
- "21 Down" 2019 (Australian Script Centre, 2019, online)
- "Falling In Love Again" 2020
- "Donating Felix" 2020
- "Everyman & His Dog" 2022
- "Anne Being Frank" 2023
- "Rootless Cosmopolitans" 2024

Children's books

- Pigtales. (Random House, 1994) ISBN 0-09-182623-3
- Too Big. (Random House, 1997) ISBN 0-09-183159-8

Teleplays

- "Death Duties" (part of Six Pack anthology series, SBS TV, 1991)

Short Films

- "Catch Perfect" (MIFF, 2012)
- "The Promised Land" (JIFF, 2025)
- "Crisis Actor" (2025)
