= Lennie Lower =

Australian journalist

Leonard "Lennie" Waldemere Lower (24 September 1903 – 19 July 1947) was an Australian humorist who is still considered by many to be the comic genius of Australian journalism.

== Life and career ==
Lower was born in Dubbo, New South Wales. His father was a pharmacist and his mother was Florence McInerney. Educated in Sydney, Lower joined the army for a brief time before turning to journalism, where his talents as a humorist soon gained him a legion of dedicated fans and a place in Australian history. He wrote up to eight columns each week for a variety of newspapers in Sydney during the Depression and World War II.

Lennie Lower wrote the novel Here's Luck in 1929 (it was published in 1930). It deals with the twists and turns of fate befalling Jack Gudgeon and his feckless son Stanley. After Jack's wife Agatha suddenly leaves them both go it on a wild rampage through Sydney's racecourses, gambling dens, pubs and cafes. Cyril Pearl, a noted Sydney journalist and Lower's editor, described Here's Luck in the following terms: "It remains pre-eminently Australia's funniest book, as ageless as Pickwick or Tom Sawyer, a work of 'weird genius', as one reviewer put it, written by a 'Chaplin of words'."

Lower's drinking was "legendary". hence the titles of his two best-known books. "Here's luck!" is a well-known Australian drinking toast, as is "Here's another!" In a column headed "Must Drink Beer" Lower announced that the "perfect job has been found": beer tasting for a research institute. Lower's description of the domestic consequences of drunkenness and hangover have the ring of long experience about them.

Lennie Lower wrote for many Australian newspapers and magazines, including The Daily Telegraph, The Sunday Telegraph, The Labor Daily and Smith's Weekly, until his death from cancer in Sydney in 1947 at the age of 43.

== Books by Lennie Lower ==
- Here's Luck (1930)
- Here's Another (1932)

Other publications were collections of Lower's articles, selected by others, such as Lennie Lower's Annual: A Side-Splitter, published by Smith's Weekly.

== Bibliography ==
Here's Lower. (1983), selected and introduced by Tom Thompson, illustrated by Patrick Cook, with a memoir by Cyril Pearl. Hale & Iremonger. ISBN 0-86806-071-2

- Hornadge, Bill (1993), Lennie Lower: He Made a Nation Laugh. Angus & Robertson. ISBN 0-207-18239-6
- Lower, Lennie (1930, reissued 1991), Here's Luck, with cartoons by WEP (W.E. Pidgeon). Angus & Robertson. ISBN 0-207-13482-0.
- Lower, Lennie (2004). Here's Another. Kessinger Publishing ISBN 1-4191-2349-1
- Lower, Lennie (1990), ed. Cyril Pearl, The Best of Lennie Lower, with cartoons by WEP (P.E. Pidgeon) Arkon/Angus & Robertson. ISBN 0-207-13480-4.
- Sheil, Pat (2003), article in the Sydney Morning Herald, 20 September.
- Julian Croft and Keith Willey (1986), "Lower, Leonard Waldemere (Lennie) (1903–1947)" in Australian Dictionary of Biography, Volume 10. Melbourne University Press..
