= The Chocolate Frog =

Play written by Jim McNeil

- Original language: English
- Written by: Jim McNeil
- Characters: Shirker; Tosser; Kevin
- Genre: Drama

Premiere
- Date: 1971

The Chocolate Frog was a short Australian play by Jim McNeil. It was written when McNeil was in prison.

The play was first performed in Parramatta Gaol by the Resurgents' Club, a club set up by inmates interested in debating ideas. The performance was seen by several theatre identities, including Katharine Brisbane, the national theatre critic of The Australian. They later assisted McNeil in his application for parole.

The play has come to be regarded as an Australian classic.
