= Jim McNeil =

Australian playwright (1935-1982)

James Thomas McNeil (23 January 1935 – 16 May 1982) was an Australian playwright. While serving a 17-year sentence in Parramatta Correctional Centre for armed robbery and shooting a police officer, McNeil began writing plays. Within a few years he was being hailed as one of Australia's three most significant playwrights of the 20th century. He was released on parole 10 years early, won an Australian Writers' Guild Award and married actress and director Robyn Nevin, from whom he later separated. At the time of his release, McNeil's plays were being produced simultaneously in every state and territory in Australia.

== Biography ==
McNeil was born on 23 January 1935 and raised in St Kilda, Victoria. As a teenager, he worked on the waterfront and became associated with the Federated Ship Painters and Dockers Union. In 1957, aged 22, he married his pregnant girlfriend Valerie and they went on to have six children.

McNeil became a criminal, specialising in armed robberies. He was dubbed by the media as "The Laughing Bandit" because of his amusement at how easy it was to take money from people at gunpoint. In 1967, after failing to appear in court in Victoria, McNeil robbed a hotel at Wentworth Falls, west of Sydney. He forced the hotel manager at gunpoint to empty the safe and in the ensuing escape, shot and wounded a police officer.

McNeil was arrested, tried, and convicted and sentenced to 17 years in prison. In Parramatta Correctional Centre, he joined "The Resurgents Debating Society", a small group of prisoners who would meet in the prison chapel to debate prison visitors, write and paint. In 1970, McNeil wrote his first play, The Chocolate Frog. It was performed by prisoners for Saturday morning visitors and was reviewed by theatre critic Katharine Brisbane.

While imprisoned at Parramatta and later, the Bathurst Correctional Complex, McNeil also wrote The Old Familiar Juice, How Does Your Garden Grow and Jack, his last play.

Australian arts identities agitated for McNeil's early release and on Monday 14 October 1974 he was released on parole 10 years early. Within months of his release from prison, he married Australian actress and director Robyn Nevin. They separated less than two years later, with Nevin taking out an apprehended violence order to prevent McNeil coming near her.

He helped Aboriginal playwright Bob Merritt to write his 1975 play The Cake Man, which he wrote while serving time for a minor offence in Bathurst Gaol.

McNeil was awarded a A$7,000 literary grant by the Australian Council for the Arts. In 1975 he won the Australian Writers' Guild award for the most outstanding script in any category for his play How Does Your Garden Grow.

Katharine Brisbane, whose Currency Press published McNeil's plays, later said that:

Re-entering the outside world did his talent no good. He was no longer the brightest, cleverest person in the room: the skills that prison life had taught him were of little use outside. He was frightened most of the time, took to drink and to making promises he could not keep... In his time he received more recognition than he deserved and he exploited everyone he got to know. His plays are still remarkable and still have an important message that those inside are people just like us on the outside, with the same feelings and the same domestic needs. But reading them today I find that they are a little thinner than I thought at first sight.

Suffering from alcohol-related issues, McNeil returned to St Kilda in 1981, living at Ozanam House, a crisis accommodation facility for homeless men. McNeil died of alcohol-related illnesses on 16 May 1982.

McNeil's life has been told in a biography WASTED by Ross Honeywill.

== Plays ==
- The Chocolate Frog (1970)
- The Last Cuppa (1970) – later reworked as The Old Familiar Juice (1972)
- How Does Your Garden Grow? (1974)
- Jack (1977)
