= The Old Familiar Juice =

Australian play

- Original language: English
- Written by: Jim McNeil
- Characters: Dadda; Stanley; Bulla
- Genre: Drama

Premiere
- Date: 1972

The Old Familiar Juice is an Australian play by Jim McNeil. It was originally written and performed in prison and has come to be regarded as an Australian classic. Jack Karlson, friend of McNeil and star of the 'Democracy Manifest' video, starred in multiple performances of the play.
