= House Gang (TV series) =

- Starring: Jocelyn Rosen
- Country of origin: Australia
- No. of seasons: 2
- No. of episodes: 12

Production
- Running time: approx. 22 min.

Original release
- Network: SBS
- Release: 1996 – 1998

House Gang is an Australian television comedy that screened on the Special Broadcasting Service. The first series of six episodes screened in 1996 and the second series of six episodes screened in 1998.

== Synopsis ==
The series features the formerly wealthy, habitually dysfunctional family of Mike Wilson and his contentious 15-year-old daughter Chloe. Mike, a builder who has gone bankrupt, and his daughter Chloe decide to move in with their tenants, a trio of handicapped young adults named Belinda (Ruth Cromer), Trevor (Saxon Graham), and Robert (Chris Greenwood), and their special-ed teacher Jack (Jeanette Cronin). At first, appalled by their new roommates, the Wilsons soon discovered that they had a lot to learn from the industrious housemates.

== Cast ==
=== Main / regular ===
- Chris Haywood as Mike Wilson
- Ruth Cromer as Belinda
- Saxon Graham as Trev
- Chris Greenwood as Robert
- Jocelyn Rosen as Chloe
- Jeanette Cronin as Jack
- Lynda Gibson as Julie
- Tracie Sammut as Donna

=== Guests ===
- Gennie Nevinson as Chris (1 episode)
- Justin Melvey as Dream Lover (1 episode)
- Kate Fitzpatrick as Astra (1 episode)
- Katharine Cullen as Jenny (1 episode)
- Lani Tupu as Dennis (2 episodes)
- Moya O'Sullivan as Shopkeeper (1 episode)
- Paul Bishop as Duane Bradley (1 episode)
- Susan Prior as Lucy's mum (1 episode)
- Susie Porter as Bottle Shop Girl (1 episode)
- Rebecca Smart as VJ (2 episodes)
