= George Mackaness (bibliophile) =

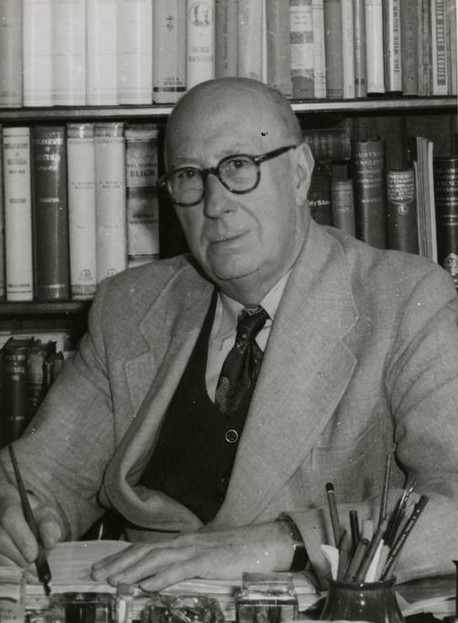
- George Mackaness
- Born: 9 May 1882; Blues Point, New South Wales, Australia
- Died: 3 December 1968 (aged 86); Five Dock, New South Wales, Australia
- Occupations: Educator, author, bibliophile
- Writing career
- Notable works: Selections from Australian Poets (1913); Inspirational Teaching (1928); Admiral Arthur Phillip (1937); The Art of Book-Collecting in Australia (1956)

George Mackaness OBE (9 May 1882 – 3 December 1968), born in Sydney, was a distinguished Australian educator, historian author, bibliographer and bibliophile.

== Life and career ==
Born in 1882, George Mackaness was the son of George Mackaness, a printer and lithographer, and his wife Annie Ellen, née Barnett. He was one of eight children in the family.

He trained as a teacher and spent many years as English master at Fort Street Boys' High School, Sydney. His book Inspirational Teaching was widely acclaimed. He was in charge of the English Department at Sydney Technical College from 1924 to 1946. He was on the board of the Commonwealth Literary Fund, and a trustee of the Public Library of New South Wales. He was longtime member of the Royal Australian Historical Society, and president in 1948–9.

He wrote over 70 books and journal articles, including a life of William Bligh (1930) and Arthur Phillip (1937). Between 1935 and 1962, he edited and privately published in limited editions, a series of Australian Historical Monographs (later reprinted by Review Publications, Dubbo), consisting of valuable original research plus reprints of key but forgotten historical pamphlets.

He amassed in his Drummoyne home probably the largest private collection of Australian books. This huge library was sold via three catalogues issued by Angus & Robertson in 1966.

Mackaness was president of the Book Collectors Society of Australia for two years (1958–1959). He was awarded the OBE in 1961 and an honorary DSc (Syd) in 1961.

== Personal life ==
He married Alice Matilda Symons in 1906. They would have one daughter, Joan.

== Bibliography ==
Below is a select list of the books published by Mackaness. Many of them are described in E. Morris Miller and Frederick T. Macartney's Australian Literature, a Bibliography to 1938, Extended to 1950.

=== Anthologies ===
- Children's Treasury of Australian Verse, Ed. by Bertram Stevens and G. Mackaness. (Syd., Angus and Robertson.) 1913.
- Selections from the Australian Poets. Ed. by Bertram Stevens and G. Mackaness. (Syd., Angus and Robertson.) 1913.
- Australian Short Stories. Chosen and ed. by G. Mackaness. (Lond., Dent.) 1928.
- Frolic Fair: A Book of Australian Verse for Children under Ten. Chosen by Joan S. Mackaness and George Mackaness (Syd., Angus and Robertson.) 1932.
- Essays: Imaginative and Critical. Chosen from Australian Writers by G. Mackaness and J. D. Holmes. (Syd., Angus and Robertson.) 1933.
- The Wide Brown Land: A New Anthology of Australian Verse. Chosen by Joan S. Mackaness and George Mackaness (Syd., Angus and Robertson.) 1934.
- Poets of Australia: An Anthology of Australian Verse. Compiled by George Mackaness. (Syd., Angus and Robertson.) 1946.

=== Bibliographies ===
- An Annotated Bibliography of Henry Lawson, Sydney: Angus and Robertson, 1951.
- The Books of "The Bulletin" 1880-1952: An Annotated Bibliography, Sydney: Angus and Robertson, 1955. Authors: Walter Stone and George Mackaness.

=== Australian history ===
- The Life of Vice-Admiral William Bligh. (1930)
- Sir Joseph Banks: His Relations with Australia. (1936)
- Admiral Arthur Phillip: Founder of New South Wales, 1738–1814. (1937)

=== English language textbooks ===
- A Handbook of Intermediate English. Sydney: Angus & Robertson: 1930; new editions in most years until 1946. Authors: George Mackaness and Sidney A. Lenehan.
