= Francis Godolphin Bond =

Francis Godolphin Bond (23 January 1765 – 26 October 1839, Exeter) was a Rear-Admiral in the British Royal Navy. He was a nephew of William Bligh and grandfather of Frederick Bligh Bond. He sailed as Bligh's First Lieutenant on HMS Providence, Bligh's second breadfruit mission to Tahiti following the ill-fated Bounty voyage.

In 1798 as a Lieutenant he commissioned the newly acquired Netley. Under his command, Netley captured numerous French and Spanish privateers, including Egyptienne. In all, under Bond Netley captured some 45 prizes, including 19 armed privateers. Reina Luisa alone was valued for purposes of prize money at £24,000. If Bond received the full ¼ due the captain of the capturing vessel(s), his share would have been £6,000, or an amount equivalent to about 15 years pay for a senior captain (in rank). This would have been in addition to the prize money for all his other captures. Bond received his promotion to Commander on 11 December 1800 and left Netley.

Bond returned to England. He was promoted to post captain on 29 April 1802. In June 1803 he received a command in the Sea Fencibles. He received no further command and though he rose to the rank rear admiral on 10 January 1837 through seniority, he actually appears never to have gone to sea again in a naval capacity after his service in Netley.

Bond died at Exeter, about three years later, on 26 October 1839, aged 74.
