= Ross Honeywill =

Australian social scientist

Ross Honeywill is an Australian social scientist. His books have been published in the US, China, Australia and New Zealand.

An adjunct associate professor in business and economics, Honeywill is chairman of the Social Intelligence Lab, based in Melbourne Australia. He has a PhD from the University of Tasmania.

He developed the NEO typology - a population classification revealing a measure of high-value consumption - for North America, Australia and Asia.

He lives in Melbourne, Australia with conceptual artist and writer, Greer Honeywill.

== Career ==
In 1997 professional services firm KPMG bought his Values Bank Research Centre and renamed it the Centre for Consumer Behaviour and appointed Honeywill director. Prior to KPMG Honeywill was a research director and management consultant. Before that, he worked as a retail manager and in arts administration.

== Books ==
Honeywill is the author of and contributor to business and social science books, as well as author of a number of mainstream books, including NEO Power, Lamarck's Evolution and Wasted. Lamarck's Evolution was launched by Nobel Laureate Professor Peter Doherty and John Long at the 2008 Melbourne Writers Festival. In 2011, Wasted was shortlisted in Australia for the Ned Kelly Award for true crime writing and is under development as a motion picture. The business/management book, One Hundred Thirteen Million Markets of One, is published in North America.

- 2001: I-Cons: the essential guide to winning and keeping high-value customers (with Verity Byth) Random House
- 2004: (Chinese edition) I-Cons: the essential guide to winning and keeping high-value customers (with Verity Byth) Citic Publishing, Mainland China
- 2006: NEO Power: how the new economic order is changing the way we live, work and play (with Verity Byth) Scribe Publications
- 2008: Managing the Innovation Faultline - chapter in Inside the Innovation Matrix (with Verity Byth) Australian Business Foundation
- 2008: Lamarck's Evolution: two centuries of genius and jealousy. Pier 9 (a Murdoch Books imprint), ISBN 1921208600
- 2010: Wasted: the true story of Jim McNeil, violent criminal and brilliant playwright. Viking (a Penguin imprint)
- 2012: One Hundred Thirteen Million Markets of One: How the New Economic Order can remake the American economy (with Chris Norton) Fingerprint, USA
- 2014: It's Not a Glass Ceiling; It's a Masculine Fault Line - chapter in Gender Discrimination and Inequality, The Spinney Press - editor J Healey
- 2016: The Man Problem: Destructive Masculinity in Western Culture, Palgrave Macmillan (New York)
- 2018: Somewhere Else to Die A novel (recipient of Arts Tasmania grant for 2014) - under construction
- 2023: Being NEO: Embrace your inner NEO and change the world. Right Customer books (Melbourne)

== Journals and papers ==
- 2011: 'Water in the Wires' - fiction - Island Magazine edition 126 (Spring 2011)
- 2011: 'A Radical Dimension of Normality: Beauvoir as diviner of masculine madness in ordinary men'. Sapere Aude - Journal of Philosophy, Vol 3, No 6. (Brazil)
- 2012: Rape: modern men making a choice - Centre for Gender Equity
- 2013: 'PM Takes a Stalinist Stance on Science' - Australasian Science, Vol 34, No 10 (December 2013)
- 2013: Gender and Biological Determinism - Centre for Gender Equity
- 2014: Tasmania - towards a new economy ISBN 978-0-646-91654-5 A paper on the contribution of low-carbon values to a new Tasmanian economy

== Achievements ==
- 2016: Advisory Board member - University of Melbourne's Social Equity Institute
- 2015: Expert Panel "Women & Girls" - Department of Premier & Cabinet (Tasmania)
- 2013: Chairman of Judges - Tasmanian Literary Awards
- 2010–13: Chairman, Festival of Voices (Tasmania)
- 1993–97: Board-member, Melbourne International Film Festival
