= How Does Your Garden Grow? (play) =

- Written by: Jim McNeil
- Characters: Sam; Brenda; Mick; The Sweeper
- Original language: English
- Genre: Drama

Premiere
- Date premiered: 1974

How Does Your Garden Grow? is an Australian play by Jim McNeil. It was his first full-length work and was written while he was a prisoner in Bathurst Prison.
