= Patric Juillet =

Australian chef and film producer

Patric Juillet is a French-Australian chef and film producer.

== Career ==
Juillet is the author of the cookbooks "Memoirs of a Sardine Lover" trilogy, "The Patric Juillet Cookbook", and several eBooks on food and ecology. He has owned the Blue Zone Jazz Wine Bar in Dingle, County Kerry in Ireland from December 2004.

== Credits ==
- Man of Flowers (1983) – assistant to director
- Unfinished Business (1985) – associate producer / caterer
- Remember Me (1985) (TV movie) – producer
- Warm Nights on a Slow Moving Train (1987) – producer / writer
- Pandemonium (1987) – executive producer
- Boundaries of the Heart (1988) – producer
- Luigi's Ladies (1989) – producer

== Personal life ==
Juillet was in a relationship with Australian actress Wendy Hughes beginning in 1980. Together they had a son, Jay. Several of the films he produced, starred Hughes, including Remember Me (1985), Boundaries of the Heart and Warm Nights on a Slow Moving Train (both 1988) and Luigi's Ladies (1989).

Juillet currently lives in the west of Ireland with his partner, Barbara, and their three daughters.
