= Juillet =

Juillet is a surname. Notable people with the surname include:

- Chantal Juillet (born 1960), Canadian classical violinist
- Christophe Juillet (born 1969), French rugby union player
- Francisco Juillet (1898–1987), Chilean cyclist
- Patric Juillet, Australian film producer

== See also ==
- Lake Juillet, a lake of Côte-Nord, Québec, Canada
- July, the month which is called "juillet" in French
