= Lex Marinos =

Australian actor (1949–2024)

Lex Marinos OAM
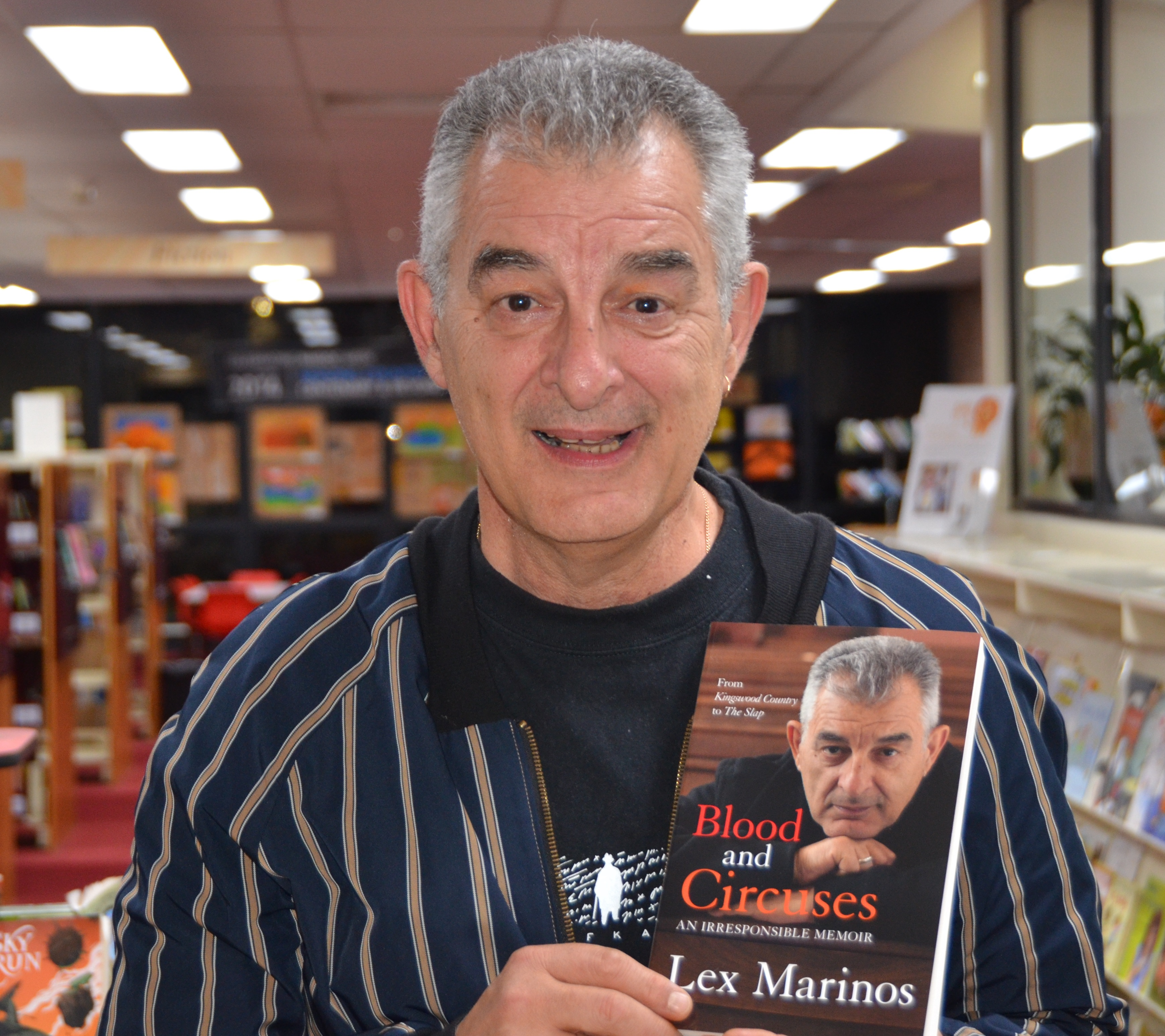
- Marinos in 2014
- Born: Alexander Francis Marinos; 1 February 1949; Wagga Wagga, New South Wales, Australia
- Died: 13 September 2024 (aged 75); Sydney, New South Wales, Australia
- Education: University of New South Wales
- Occupations: Actor, director, radio presenter
- Years active: 1967−2017
- Known for: Kingswood Country (1980–1984)

Alexander Francis Marinos OAM (1 February 1949 – 13 September 2024) was an Australian actor and television director, radio personality and voice artist. He was most notable for his role as Bruno, in the 1980s television series Kingswood Country.

== Early life ==
Marinos was born on 1 February 1949 in Wagga Wagga, New South Wales, the son of a Greek immigrant father, Fotios ('Frank') Marinopoulos and Greek-Australian mother, Anne Karofilis, who was the daughter of Adonis ('Tony') Karofilis, a Greek migrant from Kasos, Greece and Minnie Matheson, an Australian of Scottish and English origin, with descent going back to Marinos's maternal great-great-great-grandparents, Samuel Bradley, a convict, and Marian Mortimer, a free emigrant, who arrived in Hobart, Tasmania, in the 19th century.

Marinos' maternal grandparents, Adonis and Minnie, owned Greek cafés in towns across the Riverina region of New South Wales, including Wagga Wagga and The Rock, and also in the town of Bogan Gate. Marinos moved to Sydney where he attended North Sydney Boys High School. He graduated from the University of New South Wales with a Bachelor of Arts degree with honours in Drama. He also studied with renowned American acting teacher, Stella Adler.

== Career ==
In the early 1970's Lex appeared as a Gunman in NUMBER 96 series, 1974 episode 599.

In the late 1970s, Marinos began presenting on the ABC youth radio station 2JJ, later becoming a presenter on ABC Local Radio, including the show Late Night Legends on ABC2. With Ted Robinson, he was also a presenter on radio station 2JJ (Double Jay), now Triple J, in the late 1970s. He has since worked as a radio presenter on various ABC and commercial networks.

In 1980, Marinos was cast as Bruno, the Italian son-in-law of Ted Bullpitt in the 1980s television comedy series, Kingswood Country, the role for which he is most famous. He had recurring roles in television series City West (1984), Embassy (1991–1982), miniseries The Slap (2011) and Fighting Season (2018). He also appeared in several films including Cathy's Child (1979), Hoodwink (1981), Goodbye Paradise (1983), Pandemonium (1988), The Last Days of Chez Nous (1992) and Backyard Ashes (2013).

Marinos acted in theatre productions with Nimrod, the APG, Sydney Theatre Company, Melbourne Theatre Company, Company B, Big hART.

He also directed numerous stage productions, including a 1980 tour of No Room for Dreamers across Australia, England, Scotland and Ireland. He co-founded the King O'Malley Theatre Company. He was also a member of the creative and production team for the Opening Ceremony of the Sydney 2000 Olympics, directing the segment 'Arrivals' about immigrants arriving in Australia. He was the director of 'Carnivale', NSW’s multicultural arts festival, from 1996 to 1999. He was executive producer of the Yeperenye Federation Festival, for the Centenary of Federation Celebrations in Alice Springs.

He director credits also extended to film, including An Indecent Obsession (1985) and Boundaries of the Heart (1988), and the television series Bodyline (1984) and Embassy (1990).

Marinos was a former Deputy Chair of the Australia Council and the Community Cultural Development Fund of the Australia Council. He was a frequent speaker and writer on arts and cultural diversity. In 2008, he delivered the tenth annual Tom Brock Lecture, on the history of Australian immigration and rugby league. He was also guest tutor at several theatre and screen colleges.

Marinos's book "Blood and Circuses: an irresponsible memoir" was published by Allen & Unwin. He has also written for film, television, radio, and stage, as well as the publications The Bulletin, The Weekend Australian, and the Good Weekend. He was a proud member of Actors Equity since 1970.

== Honours and awards ==
Marinos was awarded the Medal of the Order of Australia (OAM) in 1994 for "service to the performing arts as an actor, director and writer." He was awarded the Centenary Medal in 2001.

In 2012, the cast of The Slap, including Marinos, received the Equity Award for Most Outstanding Performance by an Ensemble in a Television Movie or Mini-Series.

== Personal life and death ==
Marinos died in Sydney on 13 September 2024, aged 75, after a two-decade battle with leukemia. His family announced on social media that he died "peacefully… at home, at a moment of his choosing, surrounded by family and the sounds of Bob Dylan."

== Filmography ==
=== As actor ===
==== Film ====
Year	Title	Role	Notes
1971	Three to Go	Man at Dance	Anthology film, segment: "Toula"
1979	Cathy's Child	Con Havros	
1981	Hoodwink	Detective 2	
1983	Goodbye Paradise	Con	
1988	Pandemonium	Detective Sergeant Dick Dickerson	
1992	The Last Days of Chez Nous	Angelo	
1993	Bedevil	Dimitri	
2005	Lunchtime	Narrator	Short film
2006	Flights of Angels	David Johnson	Short film
2009	Bonfire	Stavros	Short film
2012	Mother's Day	Deli Owner	Short film
2013	Backyard Ashes	Mac	
2015	All About E	Joseph Malouf	
2022	Dancing with My Mother	The Husband	Short film
2024	The Gift That Gives	Lawrence Drakos	
2025	It's Our Time	Ken Lykos	

==== Television ====
Year	Title	Role	Notes
1970	The Rovers	Roberto Servijano	1 episode
1972	Switched On Set	Presenter	
1972–1973	The Aunty Jack Show	2nd Aunty Jack	3 episodes
1974	Certain Women		1 episode
1974	Flash Nick from Jindavick	Sparrow	1 episode
1975	Scattergood: Friend of All		1 episode
1975	Matlock Police	Kevin Hanson	1 episode
1975–1976	King's Men	Victor Korellis	2 episodes
1976	Alvin Purple	Bruno	1 episode
1978	Chopper Squad	Hoaxer	1 episode
1979	Cop Shop	Salvatore Rossi	1 episode
1979	Love Thy Neighbour in Australia	Kitty	1 episode
1980–1984	Kingswood Country	Bruno Bertolucci	71 episodes
1981	Home Sweet Home	Radio Announcer	1 episode
1981	Tickled Pink		1 episode
1982	Spring & Fall	Pete	1 episode
1984	City West	Tim Pappas	7 episodes
1991–1992	Embassy	Tariq Abdullah	15 episodes
1993	A Country Practice	Dr Stephen Marques	2 episodes
1995	G.P.	Theo	1 episode
1996	Water Rats	Bellamy	2 episodes
2000; 2007	Pizza	Habib's Judge / Sleek's Lawyer	2 episodes
2005	Lunchtime	Narrator	
2005	Late Night Legends	Host	
2009–2010	Histrionics	Lord High Chancellor / Judge	2 episodes
2011	The Slap	Manolis	Miniseries, 8 episodes
2014	Rake	Spiro	1 episode
2017	Bent 101	Spiro Agius	
2017	Glitch	Steve Tripidakis	3 episodes
2018	Fighting Season	Hanny Aboud	Miniseries, 4 episodes
2022	The Twelve	Nikolaos Menelaus	Miniseries, episode
2023	Mother and Son	Kenneth	1 episode
2023	NCIS: Sydney	Dimi	1 episode

=== As director / writer ===
==== Film ====
Year	Title	Role	Notes
1985	An Indecent Obsession	Director	
1985	Remember Me	Director	TV movie
1987	Perhaps Love	Director	TV movie
1988	Boundaries of the Heart	Director	
1988	Hard Knuckle	Director	TV movie
1989	The Delinquents	Writer	
1992	Anchor, Cross & Heart: The Story of Kastellorizo	Director	Direct-to-video

==== Television ====
Year	Title	Role	Notes
1984	Bodyline	Writer	Miniseries, 7 episodes
1984	Bodyline	Director	Miniseries, 2 episodes
1992	Gillies and Company	Director	
1994	A Country Practice	Director	1 episode

== Theatre ==
=== As actor ===
Year	Title	Role	Notes
1967	Saint Joan		Union Hall, Adelaide with The University of Sydney Dramatic Society
1969	The Serpent		New Theatre, Sydney
1970	Norm and Ahmed	Ahmed	Playbox Theatre, Sydney
1971	The Recruiting Officer		Southern Highlands Festival Theatre
1971	Emil and the Detectives		Southern Highlands Festival Theatre
1971	Doctor Faustus		Southern Highlands Festival Theatre
1971	Hamlet on Ice		Nimrod, Sydney
1972	Bigotry V.C.		Nimrod, Sydney
1972	Housey		Nimrod, Sydney
1973	The Tooth of Crime		Nimrod, Sydney
1973	Kaspar		Nimrod, Sydney
1974	On Yer Marx	Chico Marx	Pram Factory, Melbourne with APG
1975	Black Eyed Susan		Bondi Pavilion, Sydney
1976	Travesties		Russell St Theatre, Melbourne with MTC
1976	Are You Now Or Have You Ever Been?	Ring Lardner Jr / Louis Mandel / Jose Ferrer / Elia Kazan / Martin Berkeley	Nimrod, Sydney
1976	Arden		Russell St Theatre, Melbourne with MTC
1977	The Game of Love and Chance	Arlequin	St Martins Theatre, Melbourne with MTC
1977	Wild Oats	Twitch	Seymour Centre, Sydney with Old Tote Theatre Company
1977	Any Fool Can	Dr Arond	Bondi Pavilion, Sydney with Australian National Playwrights Conference
1977	Richard III	Chorus	Melbourne Athenaeum with MTC
1978	The Resistible Rise of Arturo Ui	Givola	Melbourne Athenaeum with MTC
1980	The Merry Wives of Windsor	Dr Caius	Sydney Opera House with STC
1982	The Fields of Heaven	Rome Bodera	Playhouse Theatre, Perth, Sydney Opera House with National Theatre Inc
1993	Duet for One	Dr Feldmann	Fairfax Studio, Melbourne with HIT Productions
1994	Flesh and Blood		National Maritime Museum, Sydney with Theatre South for Sydney Festival
1994	Comedy Festival Debate: That Sex has Killed Romance	Comedian	Dallas Brooks Hall, Melbourne with MICF
1994	Girl / Pandora Slams the Lid		Playhouse, Canberra with National Festival of Australian Theatre & Rip and Tear
1995	Shorts Programme 1: Ned / The Flying Doctor / The Bear / Out at Sea		Fairfax Studio, Melbourne with MTC
1995	Shorts Programme 2: This Property is Condemned / Love / Family Running for Mr Whippy / Like Whiskey on the Breath of a Drunk You Love		Fairfax Studio, Melbourne with MTC
2006–2012	Ngapartji Ngapartji	Various	Fairfax Studio, Melbourne, Playhouse, Perth, Belvoir, Sydney, Canberra Theatre Centre with Big hART
2008	Ruben Guthrie	Peter	Belvoir, Sydney
2009	This is Living	Rob	Tasmanian tour with 10 Days on the Island & Big hART
2009	Beyond the Neck	Tour guide	Belvoir, Sydney with Bambina Borracha Productions & B Sharp
2013; 2014	Hipbone Sticking Out	Pluto, King of the Underworld (narrator)	Canberra Theatre Centre, Playhouse, Melbourne with Big hART
2018	The Sugar House	Sidney	Belvoir, Sydney
2019	Omar and Dawn	Darren	Kings Cross Theatre, Sydney with Green Door Theatre Company, Apocalypse Theatre Company & bAKEHOUSE Theatre
2019	Sunset Strip	Ray	Butter Factory Theatre, Wodonga with Critical Stages & HotHouse Theatre
2020	Macbeth - The Installation	Duncan / Scottish Doctor	Online with Barestage Theatre
2022	The Marriage Agency	Bill	Kings Cross Theatre, Sydney with Kwento

=== As director ===
Year	Title	Role	Notes
1979	The Hypothetical End of Bert Brecht	Director	Russell St Theatre, Melbourne with MTC
1980	No Room for Dreamers	Director	England, Scotland & Ireland tour, Stables Theatre, Sydney, Newcastle Civic Theatre, Ensemble Theatre, Sydney with AETT
1980	Errol Flynn's Great Big Adventure Book for Boys	Director	Stables Theatre, Sydney with The King O'Malley Theatre Company & NSW Theatre of the Deaf
1980	The Siege of Frank Sinatra	Director	Stables Theatre, Sydney with The King O'Malley Theatre Company
1980; 1981	Porn: No Rape Trigger	Director	Stables Theatre, Sydney with The King O'Malley Theatre Company & STC
1981	Drums Along the Diamantina	Director	Stables Theatre, Sydney with The King O'Malley Theatre Company & STC
1984	Belly Busters	Director	Stables Theatre, Sydney with Griffin Theatre Company
1985	Wet Dreams	Director	Cell Block Theatre, Sydney for Sydney Festival
1986	A Coupla White Chicks	Director	University of Sydney with The Gordon Frost Organisation
1988	Starkers	Director	Canberra Theatre
1988; 1989	Living in the Seventies	Director	Seymour Centre, Sydney, Studio Theatre, Melbourne for Sydney Festival
1990	Dynamite!	Director	University of Sydney with David Atkins Enterprises
1990	Fish Wednesday	Director	Belvoir, Sydney
1992	Stool Pigeon	Director	Seymour Centre, Sydney with Sydney Festival
1992	Dancin' Dynamite	Director	Hills Centre, Sydney
1992	A Slice of Life	Director	Hills Centre, Sydney
1993	Return to the Forbidden Planet	Director	Lyric Theatre, Brisbane
1994	On Tidy Endings	Director	Lookout Theatre for Sydney Festival
1994	A Slice of Saturday Night	Director	Hills Centre, Sydney
1999	The Wound	Devisor / Director	Enmore Theatre, Sydney with Sidetrack Performance Group
2000	2000 Summer Olympics opening ceremony	Director (Arrivals)	Sydney Olympic Park
2014	Legend! Slips Cordon - A Safe Pair of Hands	Director	Old Fitzroy Theatre, Sydney with Sydney Independent Theatre Company & Decorum
