= Sandy Gore =

Australian actress

- Born: 28 June 1950 (age 76); Sydney, New South Wales, Australia
- Education: National Institute of Dramatic Art (NIDA) (1966)
- Occupation: Actress
- Spouse: George Miller (m. 1985; div. 1992)
- Children: 1

Sandy Gore (born 28 June 1950) is an Australian film and television actress, also with an extensive stage career in Australia.

== Early life and education ==
Gore's childhood dream was to study Veterinary Science but she wasn't as academically inclined as she had hoped, when it came to her Biology studies. In the last term of school, her English teacher recommended she audition for the National Institute of Dramatic Art (NIDA), and after doing so, she was accepted into the course, graduating in 1966 with a Diploma in Acting.

== Career ==
On television, Gore appeared in the hit series Prisoner in 1980, as Kay White, the payroll-embezzling accountant who met a sticky end when her gambling addiction got the better of her. She starred as Mother Ambrose in the acclaimed 1991 miniseries Brides of Christ. She played Aunt Hecla in 1992 children's sci-fi series Halfway Across the Galaxy and Turn Left. She also starred as Irene Carter, the depressive mother in 1993 Crawfords comedy series Newlyweds, alongside Annie Jones, John Wood and Cathy Godbold. She made guest appearances in series such as Grass Roots, Farscape and Rafferty's Rules.

Gore was nominated three times for the Australian Film Institute Award (now AACTA Awards) for Best Supporting Actress, for her work in the Australian films Norman Loves Rose (1982), Undercover (1983) and Street Hero (1984). She also appeared in Evil Angels (1988) and Lorenzo's Oil (1992). She played Anja in 1997 independent family comedy film Paws, alongside Nathan Cavaleri and appeared in the 2008 Baz Luhrmann epic Australia.

Gore has worked extensively with the Melbourne Theatre Company and the Sydney Theatre Company. Her stage roles include an acclaimed performance in the play Wit in 2000. She played Baptista in the 2009 Australian tour of The Taming of the Shrew with the Bell Shakespeare Company, while in 2010, she was cast as Maria in the Sydney Theatre Company production of Chekhov's Uncle Vanya, alongside Cate Blanchett and Richard Roxburgh and reprised the role in 2012, when it transferred to New York at the New York City Center.

== Personal life ==
Gore was married to Mad Max director George Miller from 1985 to 1992.

Their daughter Augusta Miller, was born in the US when her father was working on 1987 film The Witches of Eastwick. Miller also studied acting at the National Institute of Dramatic Art (NIDA) from the age of 19, graduating in 2008, and later became a documentary producer.

After Gore and Miller were divorced, Gore raised her daughter in the Sydney suburb of Mosman.

== Filmography ==
=== Film ===
Year	Title	Role	Type
1970	The Lady from Peking	Marisa Russo	Feature film
1972	Pisces Dying		Film short
1972	The Man Who Played With Boats		Film short
1974	Petersen	Suburban Housewife	Feature film
1976	Eliza Fraser	Lady	Feature film
1978	The ABC of Love and Sex: Australia Style	Narrator	Feature film documentary
1981	The Stranger		Film short
1982	Momento		Film short
1982	Dead Easy	Frieda	Feature film
1982	Norman Loves Rose	Maureen	Feature film
1983	Moving Out	Miss Stanislaus	Feature film
1983	Night of Shadows	Margo / Clare Neale / Lucy	Film short
1984	Undercover	Nina	Feature film
1984	Street Hero	Bonnie Rogers	Feature film
1984	Access Code	Uncredited	Feature film
1988	Grievous Bodily Harm	Barbara Helmsley	Feature film
1988	Evil Angels (aka A Cry in the Dark)	Joy Kuhl	Feature film
1989	Luigi's Ladies	Cee	Feature film
1989	Minnamurra	Maude Richards	Feature film
1992	Lorenzo's Oil	Murphy Family	Feature film
1997	Paws	Anja	Feature film
1998	Kissing Katie Sandstrom		Film short
2000	The Magic Pudding	Frog on the Log (voice)	Animated feature film
2006	Darklovestory	Vera	Feature film
2008	Australia	Gloria Carney	Feature film
2013	Only One	Consultant	Film short
2015	Now Add Honey	Diane	Feature film
2015	Super Awesome!	Clarice Zegrab	Feature film
2015	Women He's Undressed	Hedda Hopper / Louella Parsons	documentary film
2021	Dust Cloud	Francine	Film short

=== Television ===
Year	Title	Role	Type
1967	Bellbird		
1969–1973	Homicide	June Higgins / Jenny Moloney / Ruthie Miles / Ruth Cross	4 episodes
1969–1974	Division 4	Josie Nash / Mary Roberts / Martha Baldwin / Marie	4 episodes
1970	The Link Men	Dale	1 episode
1970	The Juggler		TV play
1972	The Norman Lindsay Festival – Dust or Polish?	Rita	TV play
1974	Matlock Police	Evelyn Armstrong	1 episode
1975	Cash and Company	Madam	1 episode
1975	Quality of Mercy	Sandy	Episode: "Send Him On His Way Rejoicing"
1976	Taggart's Treasure		TV movie
1979	Ray Lawler Trilogy	Nancy Wells / Pearl Cunningham	3 episodes
1979	Cop Shop	Margaret Jamieson	1 episode
1979	Twenty Good Years	Reba Cohen	
1980	Prisoner	Kay White	18 episodes
1981	Bellamy	Leanne	Episode 25: "The Fizz"
1981	I Can Jump Puddles	Miss Claws	Miniseries, 1 episode
1984; 1991	A Country Practice	Barbara Bolton / Meg Cullen	2 episodes
1985	Fitness – Make It Your Own Business	Herself	Film documentary
1985	I Can't Get Started	Jenny	TV movie
1985	Remember Me	Adele	TV movie
1985; 1988	The Flying Doctors		2 episodes
1988	The Clean Machine	Marcia Irving	TV movie
1988; 1990	Rafferty's Rules	Helen Hawthorne	2 episodes
1989	Chances	Connie Taylor	TV movie (unaired)
1991	Brides of Christ	Mother Ambrose	Miniseries, 6 episodes
1991	A Country Practice	Meg Cullen	4 episodes
1991	Chances		1 episode
1992	Six Pack	Analyst	Episode: "Mimi Goes to the Analyst"
1993–1994	Halfway Across the Galaxy and Turn Left	Aunt Hecla	14 episodes
1993–1994	Newlyweds	Irene Carter	52 episodes
1995	Spirits of the Forest	Narrator	TV documentary
1999	Mumbo Jumbo	Phyllis	TV movie
2000	Murder Call	Penny Satchwell	1 episode
2000–2003	Farscape	Nurse Vreena / Judge	3 episodes
2000–2003	Grass Roots	Dr. Salwah Mandikis	18 episodes
2004	Farscape: The Peacekeeper Wars	Muoma	Miniseries, 2 episodes
2014	Rake	District Court Judge	1 episode
2016	Here Come the Habibs	Tetta	2 episodes
2017	Diary of an Uber Driver	Anne	1 episode
2021	The Unusual Suspects	Jeannie	Miniseries, 4 episodes
2023	Totally Completely Fine	Gloria	1 episode
2023	Faraway Down	Gloria Carney	6 episodes
2023-25	Bay of Fires	George	3 episodes

== Theatre ==
=== As actor ===
Year	Title	Role	Type	Ref
1968	Generation			
1968	Halloran’s Little Boat	Ann Rush	St Martin’s Theatre, Melbourne	
1968	The Judge		St Martin’s Theatre, Melbourne	
1968	The Little Foxes	Alexandra Giddins	St Martin’s Theatre, Melbourne	
1968	The Living Room	Rose Pemberton	St Martin’s Theatre, Melbourne	
1970	Widowers' Houses	Miss Blanche Sartorius	St Martin’s Theatre, Melbourne	
1971	The Legend of King O'Malley		Old Tote Theatre Company, Sydney	
1973	Jugglers Three		Australian tour with MTC	
1974	The Removalists		Russell St Theatre, Melbourne with MTC	
1974	Pericles		Russell St Theatre, Melbourne with MTC	
1974	Coralie Lansdowne Says No	Coralie Lansdowne	Russell St Theatre, Melbourne with MTC	
1975	Much Ado About Nothing		Russell St Theatre, Melbourne with MTC	
1977	The Doll Trilogy: Summer of the Seventeenth Doll / Other Times / Kid Stakes	Nancy / Pearl	Theatre Royal Sydney, MTC	
1977	Pygmalion	Eliza Doolittle	Melbourne Athenaeum with MTC	
1978	Electra		Melbourne Athenaeum with MTC	
1979	Makassar Reef		Nimrod St Theatre, Sydney, Russell St Theatre, Melbourne with MTC	
1979	The Alchemist		Melbourne Athenaeum with MTC	
1979	The Rivals		Melbourne Athenaeum with MTC	
1980	Cinderella	Fairy Godmother	Melbourne Athenaeum with MTC	
1981	Shorts at the Stables		Stables Theatre, Sydney	
1982	As You Like It	Rosalind	Melbourne Athenaeum with MTC	
1982	Party Wall		Nimrod St Theatre, Sydney	
1982	A Happy and Holy Occasion		Sydney Opera House with STC	
1984	The Pillars of Society	Miss Lona Hessel	Sydney Opera House with STC	
1984	Extremities	Marjorie	Sydney Opera House with STC	
1985	Sons of Cain	Nicole	Playhouse Theatre, Melbourne with STC	
1989	Uncle Vanya		MTC	
1989	Daylight Saving		Ensemble Theatre, Sydney	
1989–1990	Big River	Mrs Adela Learmonth	Russell St Theatre, Melbourne with MTC	
1992	Antony and Cleopatra	Cleopatra	Blackfriars Theatre, Sydney with STC	
1994	Gift of the Gorgon	Helen	Wharf Theatre, Sydney with STC	
1995	Les Parents Terribles	Leo	Sydney Opera House with STC	
1996	Medea	Medea	Wharf Theatre, Sydney with STC	
1998	Chasing the Dragon	Carol	Wharf Theatre, Sydney with STC	
1998	Amy's View	Esme	Sydney Opera House with STC	
2000	Wit	Vivian Bearing	Ensemble Theatre, Sydney	
2001	Morning Sacrifice	Portia Kingsbury	Wharf Theatre, Sydney with STC	
2001	A Conversation	Lorin Zemanek	Ensemble Theatre, Sydney	
2004	Scenes from a Separation	Margaret Molyneaux	Sydney Opera House with STC	
2005–2006	The Retreat from Moscow	Alice	Ensemble Theatre, Sydney	
2007	Love Lies Bleeding	Toinette	Wharf Theatre, Sydney with STC	
2007	The Normal Heart		Wharf Theatre, Sydney with STC	
2007	Rooted		Earl Arts Centre, Launceston, Jane St Theatre, Sydney, Nimrod St Theatre, Sydney	
2008	Travelling North	Frances	Playhouse, QPAC with QTC / Hit Productions	
2009	The Taming of the Shrew	Baptista	Bell Shakespeare	
2010	Uncle Vanya	Mariya	Sydney Theatre with STC	
2011; 2012	Uncle Vanya	Mariya	Kennedy Center Washington DC, Lincoln Center, New York with STC	
2012	Under Milk Wood	Mrs. Ogmore-Pritchard / Second Voice	Sydney Opera House with STC	
2012	Becky Shaw	Susan	Ensemble Theatre, Sydney	
2013	Small and Tired	Clytemnestra	Belvoir St Theatre, Sydney	
2013	Parramatta Girls	Gayle	Riverside Productions	
2014	Calpurnia Descending	Tootles / Maximilian Silvestri	STC / Malthouse Theatre, Melbourne	
2015	Footfalls	Voice of Mother	STCSA	
2015	Shellshock: Gallipoli Tortoise	June Lindsay	Riverside Theatre Parramatta	
2016	The Great Fire	Alison	Belvoir St Theatre, Sydney	
2017	The Hakawati	Hakawati #1	National Theatre of Parramatta	
2017	Richard III	Queen Margaret	Sydney Opera House & Australian tour with Bell Shakespeare	
2017	The Plant	Sue	Ensemble Theatre, Sydney	
2017	Switzerland	Patricia Highsmith	Adelaide Festival Centre with STCSA	
2019	Enright on the Night		Genesian Theatre, Sydney	
2024	Sparkling Darkly	Monologue	Old Fitzroy Theatre, Sydney with Sugary Rum Productions	

=== As director ===
Year	Title	Role	Type	Ref
2011	Love, Loss, and What I Wore	Associate Director	Sydney Opera House with RMI & Wayne Harrison Productions	

== Narration ==
Year	Title	Role	Type
2022	Black Bones, Red Earth	Narrator	Audiobook

== Awards ==
Year	Work	Award	Category	Result	Ref
1982	Norman Loves Rose	AFI Awards	Best Performance by an Actress in a Supporting Role	Nominated	
1983	Under Cover	AFI Awards	Best Performance by an Actress in a Supporting Role	Nominated	
1984	Street Hero	AFI Awards	Best Performance by an Actress in a Supporting Role	Nominated	
1992	Brides of Christ	AFI Awards	Best Performance by an Actress in a Leading Role in a Television Drama	Nominated	
