= Peter Rasmussen (filmmaker) =

Peter Kokholm Rasmussen (1956–2008) was an Australian screenplay writer and machinima producer. Rasmussen was a leader in machinima production and development.

He is perhaps best known for the feature-length 2007 machinima film Stolen Life. Stolen Life won Best Picture, Best Visual Design, and Best Direction at the 2007 European Machinima Festival, as well as other international awards. Rasmussen is credited as producer and writer for the film.

Before becoming a filmmaker, Rasmussen was a cinematographer. He had a congenital eye disease however, which cut his cinematography career short.

Rasmussen's writing credits include In the Winter Dark, The Picture Woman, and Mad Bomber in Love, in addition to Stolen Life.

In 2009 the Sydney Film Festival launched the Peter Rasmussen Innovation Award for work described as fringe, maverick, or innovative.
