= Wendy Hughes =

Australian actress (1952–2014)

- Born: 29 July 1952; Melbourne, Victoria, Australia
- Died: 8 March 2014 (aged 61); Sydney, New South Wales, Australia
- Education: National Institute of Dramatic Art
- Occupation: Actress
- Years active: 1967–2014
- Spouse(s): Sean Scully (1971–1973) (divorced); Chris Haywood (c. 1980) (divorced); Patric Juillet (1980–?) (divorced)
- Children: 2

Wendy Hughes (29 July 1952 – 8 March 2014) was an Australian actress known for her work in theatre, film and television. Her career spanned more than 40 years and established her reputation as one of Australia's finest and most prolific actors. In her later career she acted in Happy New Year along with stars Peter Falk and Charles Durning. In 1993 she played Dr. Carol Blythe, M. E. in Homicide: Life on the Street. In the late 1990s, she starred in State Coroner and Paradise Road.

== Early life ==
Born in Melbourne to English parents, her father was born in Lancashire, but had relocated to Australia at the outbreak of World War II, where he served in the RAAF. He met her mother in London shortly after the war ended and they moved to Melbourne. Her father worked as a plasterer, and Wendy was raised in the suburb of Alphington.

Hughes originally studied ballet in Melbourne but, during her teenage years, she turned her focus to acting. She received a scholarship to attend National Institute of Dramatic Art (NIDA) and graduated from a two year course there in 1970.

== Career ==
Hughes' first television work was in Homicide; she had six guest roles in the show between 1967-73 playing different characters. She appeared in the pilot for The Group in the character of 'Laura' but was unable to continue with the show as she won the lead in Butterflies are Free at Melbourne's Playbox. Continuing to hone her skills with the Melbourne Theatre Company, she had her first film role in Petersen (1974). She later featured in the adaptation of Power Without Glory, a series first broadcast in 1976.

Called "one of the most important players in the development and productivity of Australian film", Hughes worked closely with prominent Australian artists such as the cinematographer John Seale and the writers David Williamson and Bob Ellis. She was one of the leading players in the 1970s' "New Australian Film" renaissance.

Hughes's first internationally known role was the character Patricia in Lonely Hearts (1982). That role began a decades-long collaboration with the Dutch-Australian director Paul Cox.

As one of the leading actresses in Australian cinema, Hughes's roles in the 1970s and 1980s included those in Newsfront, Kostas, My Brilliant Career, Lucinda Brayford, Touch and Go, Hoodwink, Lonely Hearts, Careful, He Might Hear You, My First Wife, I Can't Get Started, An Indecent Obsession, Echoes of Paradise, Boundaries of the Heart, Warm Nights on a Slow Moving Train (1988) and Luigi's Ladies.

Hughes made her American debut in 1987 in John G. Avildsen's film Happy New Year, opposite Peter Falk and Charles Durning. In 1989, she starred opposite Pierce Brosnan in The Heist, a TV movie made by HBO. She continued to make occasional appearances on television, such as playing Jilly Stewart in the 1983 mini-series Return to Eden. During the early 1990s, she spent time in the United States, where she played medical examiner Dr Carol Blythe in the television series Homicide: Life on the Street. She also appeared in the miniseries Amerika and made a guest appearance as Lieutenant Commander Nella Daren on Star Trek: The Next Generation, in the episode "Lessons", as one of the few love interests that Captain Jean-Luc Picard had on the show.

Back in Australia, Hughes played lead roles on television in The Man From Snowy River ("Snowy River: The McGregor Saga") and State Coroner. Hughes's film appearances at that time included the fact-based comedy-drama Princess Caraboo and Paradise Road. Her later film roles included Salvation (2007), The Caterpillar Wish (2006) and The Man Who Sued God (2001).

Stage appearances by Hughes during this time included as Mrs. Robinson in the 2001 Melbourne version of The Graduate, Martha in a 2007 staging of Who's Afraid of Virginia Woolf? by the Melbourne Theatre Company, the character of Honor in Honour in 2010, and Henry Higgins's mother in Pygmalion (2012).

Her last TV appearance was in Miss Fisher's Murder Mysteries.

== Awards ==
She was nominated for Australian Film Institute acting awards six times, and won the Best Lead actress award in 1983 for her performance in Careful, He Might Hear You.

== Personal life and death ==
Hughes married actor Sean Scully at the age of 21, after meeting on a touring production of Leonard Gershe's play Butterflies are Free in 1971. They divorced in 1973, but remained friends.

Hughes' next significant relationship was with actor Chris Haywood whom she met on the set of 1978 film Newsfront, a film now regarded as one of the best of that era. They had a daughter. The couple lived between Sydney and Melbourne, with Hughes much preferring Sydney.

Hughes was in a relationship with chef Patric Juillet beginning in 1980. Together they had a son. During this time, Juillet became a film producer, and Hughes starred in several of his films, including Remember Me (1985), Boundaries of the Heart and Warm Nights On a Slow Moving Train (both 1988) and Luigi's Ladies (1989).

Hughes died of cancer on 8 March 2014, aged 61. Actor Bryan Brown announced her death to an audience attending the play Travelling North in Sydney that afternoon, asking the audience to join him in a standing ovation in tribute to the late actress.

== Filmography ==
=== Film ===
| Year | Title | Role | Type |
|---|---|---|---|
| 1974 | Petersen | Dr. Patricia 'Trish' Kent / Charles’ wife | Feature film |
| 1975 | Sidecar Racers | Lynn Carson | Feature film |
| 1977 | High Rolling | Barbie | Feature film |
| 1978 | Newsfront | Amy Mackenzie | Feature film |
| 1979 | For a Child Called Michael | | Film short |
| 1979 | My Brilliant Career | Aunt Helen | Feature film |
| 1979 | Kostas | Carol | Feature film |
| 1980 | Touch and Go | Eva | Feature film |
| 1981 | Hoodwink | Lucy | Feature film |
| 1982 | Duet for Four | Barbara Dunstan | Feature film |
| 1982 | Partners | | Feature film |
| 1982 | A Dangerous Summer | Sophie McCann | Feature film |
| 1982 | Lonely Hearts | Patricia Curnow | Feature film |
| 1983 | Careful, He Might Hear You | Vanessa | Feature film |
| 1984 | My First Wife | Helen | Feature film |
| 1985 | An Indecent Obsession | Honor Langtry | Feature film |
| 1985 | Can't Get Started | Margaret | TV film |
| 1987 | Echoes of Paradise (aka Shadows of the Peacock) | Maria | Feature film |
| 1987 | Happy New Year | Carolyn | Feature film |
| 1988 | Warm Nights on a Slow Moving Train | Jenny Nicholson aka The Girl | Feature film |
| 1988 | Boundaries of the Heart | Stella Marsden | Feature film |
| 1989 | Luigi's Ladies | Sara | Feature film |
| 1991 | Wild Orchid II: Two Shades of Blue | Elle | Feature film |
| 1994 | Princess Caraboo | Mrs. Worrall | Feature film |
| 1996 | Lust and Revenge | George's advisor | Feature film |
| 1997 | Paradise Road | Mrs. Dickson | Feature film |
| 2001 | The Man Who Sued God | Jules Myers | Feature film |
| 2006 | The Caterpillar Wish | Elizabeth Roberts | Feature film |
| 2007 | Salvation | Gloria | Feature film |
| 2008 | The View from Greenhaven | Dorothy | Feature film |
| 2008 | Not Quite Hollywood: The Wild, Untold Story of Ozploitation! | Herself | Feature film documentary |
| 2009 | Just Desserts | Judy | Film short |
| 2011 | On Borrowed Time | Self | Feature film documentary |

=== Television ===
| Year | Title | Role | Type |
|---|---|---|---|
| 1967–1972 | Homicide | Barbara Carlisle / Jan Smith / Rosalind Eyre / Helen Raynor / Darlene Sadler / Julie Smith | 6 episodes |
| 1968 | Hunter | Sue Gallagher | 1 episode |
| 1971 | The Group | Guest role: Laura Bent | 1 episode |
| 1971–1976 | Matlock Police | Jill Perry / Joanna / Fran Carmody / Patti Anderson | 5 episodes |
| 1972 | A Time For Love | | |
| 1974 | A Touch of Reverence | | Miniseries, 3 episodes |
| 1974 | Eye of the Spiral (aka The Spiral Bureau) | | TV film |
| 1974 | The Cherry Orchard | | Teleplay |
| 1974 | Essington | | TV film |
| 1975 | Behind the Legend | | Season 3, episode 10: 'Christopher Brennan' |
| 1975 | Number 96 | Vanessa Harrison | |
| 1975 | The Company Men | Jill Freeman | 3 episodes |
| 1976 | Rush | Emma | 1 episode |
| 1976 | Is There Anybody There? | Marianne Dickinson | TV film |
| 1976 | The Outsiders | Susan Mayfield | 1 episode |
| 1976 | The Alternative | Melanie Hilton | TV film |
| 1976 | Power Without Glory | Mary West | Miniseries, 12 episodes |
| 1978 | A Woman in the House | | TV film |
| 1978 | Puzzle | Claudine Cunningham | TV film |
| 1980 | Cop Shop | Marian McCall | 1 episode |
| 1980 | Australian Theatre Festival: Coralie Landsdowne Says No | Coralie Landsdowne | Teleplay |
| 1980 | Lucinda Brayford | Lucinda Brayford | Miniseries, 4 episodes |
| 1983 | Return to Eden | Jilly Stewart | Miniseries, 3 episodes |
| 1984 | Sunday Australian Movies | Presenter | Anthology series |
| 1984 | Five Mile Creek | Arabella | 1 episode |
| 1985 | I Can't Get Started | Margaret | TV film |
| 1985 | Remember Me | Jenny | TV film |
| 1985 | Promises to Keep | Uncredited | TV film |
| 1987 | Amerika | Marion Andrews | Miniseries, 7 episodes |
| 1989 | The Heist | Sheila | TV film |
| 1990 | Donor | Dr. Farrell | TV film |
| 1991 | Sukeban deka: Gyakushu-hen | Additional voices | Video game |
| 1991 | A Woman Named Jackie | Janet Lee Bouvier | Miniseries, 3 episodes |
| 1993 | Homicide: Life on the Street | Dr. Carol Blythe, M.E. | 5 episodes |
| 1993 | Star Trek: The Next Generation | Lieutenant Commander Nella Daren | Sixth season, episode 19: "Lessons" |
| 1994 | Blue Seed | Additional voices | Animated TV series |
| 1994–1996 | Banjo Paterson's The Man From Snowy River (aka Snowy River: The McGregor Saga) | Kathleen O'Neil/McGregor | 52 episodes |
| 1995 | Golden Boy: Sasurai no o-benkyo yaro | Employee C (voice) | TV series |
| 1996 | State Coroner | State Coroner Kate Ferrari | TV pilot |
| 1997–1998 | State Coroner | State Coroner Kate Ferrari | TV series, 28 episodes |
| 2005 | MDA | Gabrielle Bromley | TV film series, 4 episodes |
| 2006 | Two Twisted | Barber's Wife | TV film series, episode 5: 'Von Stauffenberg's Stamp |
| 2007 | A Wire Through the Heart | Narrator | Documentary |
| 2007 | Constructing Australia | Narrator | Documentary series, 3 episodes |
| 2007 | The Fabric of a Dream: The Fletcher Jones Story | Narrator | TV documentary |
| 2007 | City Homicide | Victoria Semple | 1 episode |
| 2007 | The Bridge | Narrator | Documentary |
| 2008 | The Saddle Club | Louise Lomax (as Wendy Hughs) | 1 episode |
| 2009 | All Saints | Annalise Lang | 1 episode |
| 2009 | Darwin's Brave New World | Narrator | 3 episodes |
| 2012 | Miss Fisher's Murder Mysteries | Adele Freeman | 1 episode |

== Stage ==
| Year | Title | Role | Notes |
|---|---|---|---|
| 1967 | The Choephori (The Libation Bearers) | Chorus Member | UNSW, Sydney with NIDA |
| 1968 | Romeo and Juliet | Juliet | Monash University, Melbourne with Melbourne Youth Theatre |
| 1969 | Spurt of Blood | | Jane St Theatre, Sydney with NIDA |
| 1969 | Antigone | Ismene | NIDA Theatre, Sydney with AETT |
| 1969 | Cat on a Hot Tin Roof | Big Mumma | UNSW, Sydney with Old Tote Theatre |
| 1970 | A Midsummer Night's Dream | Hippolyta | UNSW, Sydney with Old Tote Theatre & AETT |
| 1970 | Blood Wedding | Old Woman / Young Servant Girl | UNSW, Sydney with Old Tote Theatre |
| 1970 | Hedda Gabler | Berte | NIDA Theatre, Sydney |
| 1971 | Butterflies are Free | Jill Tanner | Australian national tour with Harry M. Miller |
| 1971; 1972 | Patate | | Russell St Theatre, Melbourne, Princess Theatre, Melbourne, Arts Theatre, Adelaide with MTC |
| 1972 | Tonight at 8.30: Shadow Play / Red Peppers / Family Album | | Russell St Theatre, Melbourne with MTC |
| 1972 | Danton's Death | Madame Catherine Duplessis | Russell St Theatre, Melbourne with MTC |
| 1972 | A Touch of the Poet | Sarah, the daughter | Russell St Theatre, Melbourne with MTC |
| 1972 | The Tavern | | Russell St Theatre, Melbourne with MTC |
| 1972; 1973 | The Cherry Orchard | Anya | Australian tour with MTC |
| 1972; 1973 | An Ideal Husband | Miss Mabel Chiltern | Australian national tour with MTC |
| 1972; 1973 | Tom | | Russell St Theatre, Melbourne with MTC |
| 1973 | Mother Courage | Katerin | Princess Theatre, Melbourne with MTC |
| 1973 | The Plough and the Stars | | Russell St Theatre, Melbourne with MTC |
| 1973 | Batman's Beach-Head | | Comedy Theatre, Melbourne with MTC |
| 1973 | Paying the Piper | | Comedy Theatre, Melbourne with MTC |
| 1980 | She'll Be Right | Voice Over Artist | Parramatta Correctional Centre with Pros and Cons Playhouse |
| 1981 | Cat on a Hot Tin Roof | Margaret | Sydney Opera House with STC |
| 1983 | Present Laughter | Liz | Theatre Royal Sydney with STC |
| 1990 | Li'l Abner | Choreographer | Monash University, Melbourne with Peninsula Light Operatic Society |
| 1999–2000 | Happy Days - The Arena Mega Musical | Marion Cunningham | Australian national tour |
| 2000 | Oedipus | Jocasta | Wharf Theatre, Sydney with STC |
| 2001 | The Graduate | Mrs Robinson | Theatre Royal Sydney with The Really Useful Company |
| 2002 | Sweet Bird of Youth | Alexandra del Lago | Playhouse, Melbourne with MTC |
| 2003 | The Goat, or Who Is Sylvia? | Stevie | Fairfax Studio, Melbourne with MTC |
| 2004 | Amigos | Hilary | NSW, VIC & ACT tour with STC & MTC |
| 2006 | The Clean House | Lane | Fairfax Studio, Melbourne with MTC |
| 2007; 2013 | Who's Afraid of Virginia Woolf? | Martha | Fairfax Studio, Melbourne with MTC |
| 2009 | Seven Deadly Sins Four Deadly Sinners | | Playhouse, Perth with Onward Production |
| 2010 | All About My Mother | Huma Rojo | MTC |
| 2010, 2013 | Honour | Honour | Sydney Opera House with STC |
| 2012 | Pygmalion | Mrs Higgins | Sydney Theatre with STC |
| 2012 | Face to Face | Jenny's Aunt | Sydney Theatre with STC |
