= Street Hero =

- Directed by: Michael Pattinson
- Written by: Jan Sardi
- Produced by: Paul Dainty; Julie Morton
- Starring: Vince Colosimo; Sigrid Thornton; Sandy Gore; Bill Hunter; Peta Toppano
- Cinematography: Vince Monton
- Edited by: David Pulbrook
- Production company: Paul Dainty Films
- Distributed by: Roadshow Films
- Release date: 16 August 1984; (Australia)
- Running time: 102 minutes
- Country: Australia
- Language: English
- Budget: AU$2.5 million
- Box office: AU$729,344 (Australia)

Street Hero is a 1984 Australian drama film directed by Michael Pattinson and starring Vince Colosimo, Sigrid Thornton, Sandy Gore, Bill Hunter and Ray Marshall. The film won an AFI award.

== Plot ==
Vinnie is a teenage boy who is an outcast at school, alienating teachers and students alike. He is a local courier for the local Mafia boss. He lives in welfare housing with his mother (Peta Toppano), a young brother and sister, and his Mum's lover whom he cannot stand. Vinnie takes out his aggression with the world practising boxing at the local gym. He is haunted by images of his father (when just a boy he witnessed his father's murder) and his father's boxing career. His music teacher (Sandy Gore) encourages him to get involved as a drummer with the school band, and his girlfriend Gloria (Sigrid Thornton) and others influence him to stay away from the Mafia.

== Cast ==
- Vince Colosimo as Vinnie
- Sigrid Thornton as Gloria
- Sandy Gore as Bonnie Rogers
- Bill Hunter as Detective Fitzpatrick
- Ray Marshall as George
- Amanda Muggleton as Miss Reagan
- Peta Toppano as Vinnie's Mother
- Luciano Catenacci as Ciccio
- Peter Albert Sardi as Joey
- Robert Noble as Mick O'Shea
- Tibor Gyapjas as Freddo
- Vince D'Amico as Nino
- John Lee as Vice Principal
- Fincina Hopgood as Trixie
- John Murphy as Old Harry
- Tony Volpe as Sylvester
- Libbi Gorr as Alexia
- Laurie Dobson as SP Bookmaker
- Shane Connor as Yokel's Mate
- Pip Mushin as Yokel's Mate
- Jenny Apps as Yokel's Moll
- George Bidlo as Large Man
- Lois Collinder as Travel Lady
- George Harlem as Pimp
- Tiriel Mora as Junky
- Chris Hargreaves as Policeman
- Graham Brooke as 1st Boxing Opponent

== Awards ==
Street Hero was nominated for seven AFI awards in 1984 including Best Actor (Vince Colosimo), Best Supporting Actress (Sandy Gore), Best Supporting Actress (Peta Toppano), Best Original Screenplay (Jan Sardi), Best Original Music Score (Garth Porter), although it only won Best Achievement in Sound.

== Production ==
Colosimo, Sardi and Pattinson had previously made Moving Out (1982). When making that film Sardi and Pattinson discovered music teachers would help underprivileged children by encouraging them to become involved in music, which inspired this film. Pattinson took the script to Bonnie Harris of Roadshow Entertainment, who got Paul Dainty involved.

The movie was a conscious effort on the part of Pattinson and Sardi to make something more commercial than their first film, while still having something based in reality. The director later admitted that the choice of music used in the film - including Leo Sayer, Sharon O'Neill and Dragon - was "maybe a bit too middle of the road".

== Box office ==
Street Hero took in $729,344 (AUS) at the box office, making it the 203rd most successful Australian Film (1996–2008).

== Soundtrack ==
Cover of Street Heroes Soundtrack

1. "Every Beat of My Heart" (Garth Porter) - Jon English, Renee Geyer - 3:04
2. "New Hero" (Ian Morrison, Les Barker) - Dear Enemy - 4:19
3. "Blood Red Roses" (Sharon O’Neill) - Sharon O’Neill - 4:58
4. "Haunting Me" (Leo Sayer, Vini Poncia) - Leo Sayer - 4:52
5. "Billy’s Theme"(Rock instrumental) (Garth Porter) - 2:05
6. "Wilderworld" (Todd Hunter, Johanna Pigott, Marc Hunter) - Dragon - 3:55
7. "Death Before Dishonour" (Ross Wilson, David Pepperell, James Black) - Ross Wilson, James Black - 4:06
8. "No Angels Tonight" (Garth Porter, Clive Shakespeare, Tony Leigh) - Daryl Braithwaite - 3:30
9. "Something To Believe In" (Del Shannon, Wendy Matthews) - Del Shannon - 3:11
10. "Every Beat of My Heart" (Garth Porter, Red Symons, John Shaw) - The Streethero Orchestra - 3:09
