= Paws (film) =

- Australian home video cover
- Directed by: Karl Zwicky
- Written by: Harry Cripps; Karl Zwicky
- Produced by: Rebel Penfold-Russell; Andrena Finlay; Vicki Watson
- Starring: Billy Connolly; Nathan Cavaleri; Emilie François; Sandy Gore; Heath Ledger
- Cinematography: Geoff Burton
- Edited by: Nicholas Holmes
- Music by: Mario Millo
- Production companies: Australian Film Finance Corporation; Latent Image
- Distributed by: PolyGram Filmed Entertainment
- Release dates: 25 September 1997 (Australia); 15 February 1998 (United Kingdom)
- Running time: 84 minutes
- Countries: Australia; United Kingdom
- Language: English
- Box office: £137,731 (UK, opening weekend); A$455,171 (Australia)

Paws is an independent 1997 Australian family comedy film that was released on 25 September 1997 in Australia and filmed in Sydney.

The film stars 15-year-old guitarist Nathan Cavaleri who has adventures with PC—a talking Jack Russell Terrier (voiced by comedian Billy Connolly). The dog is computer literate—skills acquired from his former master allowing him to create a computer program that translates his words into English, with Zac subsequently designing a portable version that can be 'concealed' in a bow tie—and the pair must stop a valuable disk from falling into the wrong hands.

== Plot ==
Alex, a computer programmer from a cold place very far away, receives a visit from an intruder named Anja, but before she breaks in; he writes an important message to a colleague, at a greyhound racetrack, named Susie, transfers it to a floppy disk and gives it to his dog PC, warning him that he should give it only to Susie and trust no one. He hides PC just before Anja breaks in with her vicious dog, Sibelius and threatens him for money. He tells her that the money is in the retirement fund, after which she kills him. But later she finds that the money is missing and sees the initials SA on the file name which she discovers, in the nearby address book; to stand for Susie Arkwright and starts spying on Susie.

PC reaches Susie's neighbourhood but gets hit by a car and is taken in by the family of 14-year-old Zac (the film's main narrator along with PC) who had recently moved to Sydney from Melbourne with his mother Amy, step-father Stephen and his younger sister Binky. Zac thinks the disk is one of his and keeps it. Zac is then introduced to his new neighbour Susie, who grew up in Sydney, and her daughter Samantha who moved from London and live next door and they recognise PC. Then they learn of Alex's death and PC continues to stay with Zac's family. PC uses Zac's computer to make a translation programme that could translate any language or sound into plain English, even his barking. He demonstrates it to Zac who gives him a new voice with a Scottish accent and installs the software onto a palmtop computer with a microphone in a bow tie so he can talk away from the desktop.

Zac's relationship with PC is strained and after a spate of incidents, often involving Anja and Sibelius, the dog decides to tell him the truth. PC was originally from Iceland where Alex wrote computer programmes and he was married to Anja who was his assistant but she never loved him. Anja stole Alex's programmes and made at least a million dollars from them. Alex got heartbroken when he found the money which he withdrew and fled to Australia with PC to escape from her but Anja found him somehow.

Zac finds the floppy disk which has a clue on where to find information on where to find the money. Zac goes with PC and Sammy to Alex's flat and completes the crossword puzzle on the computer to see a video of Alex saying "A note to follow so" followed by a picture of a pea-like object. After singing "Do-Re-Mi" they figure that the password is LAP then they see another video of Alex this time saying "Well done. The rest is in and under your nose. Bonne Chance". Anja arrives and threatens them with a dagger so Zac deletes the file to stop her but she kidnaps PC.

Back home Stephen, who Zac had previously seen taking a loan from Anja, agrees to help them and they go to the greyhound track where Alex and Susie worked. PC tricks Sibelius into letting him out of the cage but when Zac comes to help him he lets out Anja's dog who chases after them. Sammy deciphers the clue but takes "LAP in" to be the French word for rabbit and tells PC who is then catapulted into the commentator's box where he announces that the money is in the rabbit. Anja takes this to mean the mechanical rabbit on the track and starts tearing it apart but gets stuck and is dragged around the track not finding any money. Binky finds Sammy's Hollywood pin badge, which Alex gave her, and asks "What's a Hollywood?", and Sammy explains that it is a place in L.A.; they then realise that the clue means L.A. pin and they find jewelry inside it.

The film ends with PC making out with Sammy's dog Cordelia.

== Cast ==
- Billy Connolly as PC
- Nathan Cavaleri as Zac
- Emilie François as Samantha
- Freyja Meere as Binky, Zac's sister
- Rachael Blake as Amy, Zac and Binky's mother
- Nick White as Zac's father
- Joe Petruzzi as Stephen, Zac's stepfather
- Caroline Gillmer as Susie, Samantha's mother
- Norman Kaye as Alex
- Sandy Gore as Anja
- Kevin Golsby as Commentator
- Rebel Penfold-Russell as Carla
- Alyssa-Jane Cook as Trish
- Daniel Kellie as Puck
- Matthew Krok as Bottom
- Gezelle Byrnes as Agnes
- Richard Carter as Cafe owner
- Ben Connolly as Billy
- Charles Conway as Priest
- Julie Godfrey as Sister Deidre
- Denni Gordon as Dog hairdresser
- Heath Ledger as Oberon
- David Nettheim as Rabbi
- Gulliver Page as Fan operator

== Release ==
The film was released theatrically on 25 September 1997 in Australia and on 15 February 1998 in the United Kingdom where it was rated PG uncut but in its VHS release in the UK, later that year, the film was re-rated U with nine seconds of cuts removing the instances of "bum" and "crappy" to tone down the language. However, the uncut version has since been released on digital distribution in the UK given the legislation covering BBFC certificates on physical home video formats does not apply to online video services.
