= The Delinquents (1989 film) =

- Theatrical release poster
- Directed by: Chris Thomson
- Screenplay by: Clayton Frohman; Mac Gudgeon
- Based on: The Delinquents by Criena Rohan
- Produced by: Alex Cutler; Michael Wilcox
- Starring: Kylie Minogue; Charlie Schlatter; Angela Punch McGregor; Bruno Lawrence
- Cinematography: Andrew Lesnie
- Edited by: John Scott
- Music by: Miles Goodman
- Production companies: Village Roadshow Pictures; Silver Lining Entertainment
- Distributed by: Warner Bros. (though Roadshow Film Distributors)
- Release date: 21 December 1989 (Australia)
- Running time: 103 minutes
- Country: Australia
- Language: English
- Budget: AU$9 million
- Box office: $3,370,650

The Delinquents is a 1989 Australian coming-of-age romantic drama film directed by Chris Thomson from a screenplay by Clayton Frohman and Mac Gudgeon, based on Criena Rohan's 1962 book of the same name. It is the first film by Village Roadshow Pictures. It stars Kylie Minogue (in her feature film debut) and Charlie Schlatter as the main characters Lola and Brownie, and was filmed in the Queensland locations of Brisbane, Maryborough and Bundaberg.

The film was released in Australia on 21 December 1989 to mixed reviews from critics. It grossed $3,370,650 at the box office in Australia. An accompanying soundtrack was also released.

== Plot ==
Lola and Brownie are teenagers in 1950s Bundaberg, Australia. They fall in love, but because of their age they must fight their parents and welfare, who try to keep them apart. Lola falls pregnant and the couple run away so they can keep their baby. However, Lola's mother and the police find them and take Lola home.

Brownie joins the crew of a ship so he can sail the coast and look for Lola. He befriends a sailor called Bosun, who offers him a job.

Meanwhile, Lola is forced to have an abortion by her mother in Brisbane. After an argument with her mother, Lola moves to Melbourne, becomes a waitress and bleaches her hair. Lola is reunited with Brownie after he visits the bar where she works whilst on shore leave. They return to his ship and they spend the night together. The next day, Bosun discovers Lola in Brownie's cabin and asks her to leave. After an argument between Brownie and Bosun, the latter agrees to Lola staying, on the condition that she is kept "out of sight" from the other sailors.

After the ship docks, Lola and Brownie attend a party held by a young couple, Lyle and Mavis. They are squatting in the property with their daughter, Sharon. Both couples quickly become friends and Lola and Brownie move into their spare room.

One night, both couples are socialising in a local pub when Lola and Brownie are arrested for underage drinking and vagrancy.

Lola is sent to stay with Aunt Westbury, a caretaker in the countryside for a fixed-term of 12 months. She and Brownie are told that they are not allowed to see or contact each other for one year. Brownie was also issued with a fine.

During Lola's stay in the community placement, a former charge of Aunt's visits the house. Lola collects the mail and, after a brief conversation with the postman, realises that Aunt Westbury has disposed of Brownie's letters. An argument follows, and Lola runs away.

Finding her mother drunk and unsympathetic, Lola heads to Lyle and Mavis's house, only to be arrested and taken to a reform school to restart and complete her sentence. During this time, a riot is started by the other inmates.

After her 18th birthday, Lola has completed her sentence and is immediately reunited with Brownie. Upon returning to the house, Lola discovers Mavis is heavily pregnant with her second child.

Lola wants Brownie to quit his job as a sailor, and stay with her. However, Brownie is in a quandary and confides in Bosun about his dilemma. Meanwhile, Mavis goes into labour; the birth does not go well and both Mavis and the baby die.

Although Lola and Brownie offer to adopt Sharon (Lyle & Mavis' surviving daughter), they are unable to as they are unmarried. Lyle leaves the child with Lola to give to social services as she will be placed into foster care and Lyle is unable to bear the thought of giving up his only child. Lyle subsequently leaves after telling Lola he plans to travel the world, taking on odd jobs to make ends meet.

Lola leaves the house, suitcase packed, ready to take Sharon to the welfare office before heading back to Bundaberg. Brownie sees Lola and Sharon in the taxi and runs after them. Eventually, Brownie catches up with the taxi and he is reunited with Lola and Sharon. The film ends with their wedding with their families and friends in attendance.

== Cast ==
- Kylie Minogue as Lola Lovell
- Charlie Schlatter as Brownie Hansen
- Bruno Lawrence as Bosun
- Todd Boyce as Lyle
- Desirée Smith as Mavis
- Angela Punch McGregor as Mrs. Lovell
- Melissa Jaffer as Aunt Westbury
- Lynette Curran as Mrs. Hansen
- Duncan Wass as Bert
- Lyn Treadgold as Prison matron
- Rosemary Harris as Isobel
- Rachel Szalay as Maxine
- Jonathan Hardy as Magistrate

== Original novel ==
The novel was published in 1962. It had been written in a TB hospital, and subsequently submitted for the Miles Franklin Award. Author Rohan died in 1963, having only published one other book in her lifetime. The novel was re-published in 1986, and again in 1989 to tie-in with the release of the film.

There are some differences between the film and the novel. For example, in the novel, Lola is part Asian and suffers a miscarriage on the grounds of the all-girls school. It is uncertain whether the screenplay was adjusted or the missing parts of the book were filmed and removed to meet a lower certificate.

== Production ==
Rights to the novel were purchased by first time producers Alex Cutler and Michael Wilcox in 1985. They had been trying to obtain the rights to another Australian novel but had difficulty negotiating with the author; someone suggested they have a look at The Delinquents, which Penguin were about to reissue. They obtained finance from the New South Wales Film Corporation and Australian Film Commission and hired Lex Marinos to write a draft. In 1987, David Bowie announced in an interview he thought the book would make a good film, which re-ignited a great deal of interest in the project. It was announced that he would compose the film's score but subsequently distanced himself from the film's production, and interviewed in 1990, he cited "a large artistic disagreement with [the] producers" over the direction of the film as the reason he was no longer involved in the film. He said, "the book that I read and the film that they were making had nothing to do with each other", adding "it was a wonderful little book and it should have been a little film. It should have been an Australian film."

The Australian Film Commission provided further script development money enabling Dorothy Hewett to write a second draft. Greg Coote and John Tarnoff of Village Roadshow became involved and Coote suggested Kylie Minogue play the lead. It was the first major film from Village Roadshow's film production company. At one stage Ben Mendelsohn was signed to appear opposite her but eventually it was decided to go with an imported actor so the film might appeal to an international market: Charlie Schlatter was chosen.

Chris Thomson was approached to direct. He did not like the script but thought the book was wonderful, so managed to persuade the producers to hire Mac Gudgeon, who had made Waterfront (1983) with Thomson, to work on the script. Village Roadshow agreed to provide half the budget and the producers applied to the FFC for further finance in October 1988.

The film was partly shot at Warner Bros. studios on the Gold Coast. Production was accompanied by media reports of script and casting interference by US executives, who reportedly faxed numerous script changes to reduce the use of Australian references and slang. With investors hoping to replicate the success of Dirty Dancing, it was hoped that a young audience would turn out to see the film "6 or 7 times".

== Release and reception ==
After a London world premiere, The Delinquents opened in Australia and New Zealand on 21 December 1989 in wide release. Five days after the Australasian release date, it opened in the United Kingdom on 26 December 1989. It was later announced that the film would be released in other European countries; it was released on 1 June 1990 in Finland and Sweden under the name Delinquents – Nuoret Kapinalliset. It opened in the Netherlands on 8 June. It was released on 15 June 1990 in Denmark under the name For ung til kærlighed. Then Portugal on 29 June. Its last release was in Germany. In Italy, the movie was released under the title I delinquenti.

Despite having chosen an American lead actor and an American composer, with an eye to the American market, the film was never released in the United States, in part due to a problem with distribution. This led to the production company filing a lawsuit against Village Roadshow Pictures and the FFC.

=== Reception ===
The film was hit with controversy over its content, with Britain's Daily Mail asserting that it was "immoral and dangerous" that it had been given a 12 certificate, allowing young children to see it. David Stratton of Variety called the story "trite stuff" and felt that Schlatter was miscast and that "as for Minogue, the verdict still is out regarding a future acting career ... but it's unfair to judge her on this material". DVD.net later gave the movie a mixed review, scoring it 5/10. On Scoopy.com, the reviewer complimented the film's cinematography, the period details and Minogue's lead role in the film. The Radio Times grades the film two stars out of five, calling it a "passable tale of teenage torment".

=== Box office ===
The Delinquents opened on 98 screens in Australia, grossing A$752,800 in its opening week. It went on to gross A$3,370,650 at the Australian box office and was the most successful Australian film of 1990 on Australian soil. In the United Kingdom it grossed £399,785 in its opening weekend from 207 screens and reached number one, grossing £1,072,110 in its first week. It was the 17th highest-grossing film of 1989 there. It was the most popular Australian film of 1990.

In one interview, producer Mike Wilcox hit out over the "mythology" that the film was a financial failure, saying, "I wonder where these people get their information from because I was part of the production and I don't have accurate figures on what its performance was. I think the jury is still out on whether it was a financial failure or not."

=== Home media ===
The Delinquents was released on VHS worldwide in 1990 and released on DVD in 2005 in Australia only. In 2008, a new special edition of the film was released in Italy under the name The Delinquents - Le regole sono fatte per essere infrante. The set includes 20 exclusive video clips introduced by Kylie Minogue, the original trailer, a photo gallery, and other bonus features, all packaged in a DVD-sized case with a wrap-around picture insert. The film was released internationally on digital platforms, including iTunes in 2016.

== Soundtrack ==
The soundtrack album was released in Australia and New Zealand by Mushroom Records and in the UK by PWL Records. The soundtrack release consisted of old standards (one of them performed by Minogue and one by Johnny Diesel and the Injectors), as well as one track from the film's score. "Tears on My Pillow" was released as a single in February 1990, peaking at number 20 in Australia. "Please Send Me Someone to Love" was released as a single, peaking at number 11 in Australia. Tears on My Pillow went to number one in the UK for one week in January 1990, and was the 26th best-selling single of the year in the UK during 1990.

1. "Please Send Me Someone to Love" – Johnny Diesel and the Injectors (Written by Percy Mayfield) (4:25)
2. "Slippin' and Slidin'" – Little Richard (Written by Little Richard (as Penniman)/Eddie Bo (as Edwin J. Bocage)/Al Collins/James Smith) (2:33)
3. "Twenty Flight Rock" – Eddie Cochran (Written by Ned Fairchild/Eddie Cochran) (1:45)
4. "Break Up" – Jerry Lee Lewis (Written by Charlie Rich) (2:40)
5. "Be-Bop-A-Lula" – Gene Vincent & His Blue Caps (Written by Gene Vincent/Tex Davis) (2:36)
6. "Lucille" – Swanee (Written by Richard Penniman/Al Collins) (2:24)
7. "One Night" – Fats Domino (Written by David Bartholomew/Pearl King) (2:50)
8. "Only You" – The Platters (Written by Buck Ram/Ande Rand) (2:38)
9. "Tears on My Pillow" – Kylie Minogue (Written by Bradford Lewis) (2:31)
10. "Theme From The Delinquents" – The Delinquents Orchestra (Composed and Conducted by Miles Goodman) (2:24)

Songs heard in the film but not on the soundtrack album:

1. "Three Steps To Heaven" by Eddie Cochran (Written by Eddie Cochran)
2. "Tennessee Waltz" by Patti Page (Written by King/Stewart)
3. "Great Balls of Fire" by Pattie Page (Written by Otis Blackwell/Jack Hammer)
4. "Since I Met You Baby" by Ivory Joe Hunter (Written by Joe Hunter)
5. "Chantez Chantez" by Dinah Shore (Written by Albert Gamse/Irving Fields)
6. "My Babe" by Little Walter (Written by Willie Dixon)
7. "She's My Baby" by Johnny O'Keefe (Written by Turnball/Molfast/Finch)
8. "Roll With Me Henry" by Johnny O'Keefe (Written by Turnball/Molfast/Finch)

=== Charts ===
Chart (1989)	Peak position
Australian Albums (ARIA)	20

== See also ==
- Cinema of Australia
- Endless Love
- The Promise
- Suicide Blonde (INXS Song)
