= Lilian's Story =

- Directed by: Jerzy Domaradzki
- Based on: novel by Kate Grenville
- Starring: Toni Collette; Ruth Cracknell; Barry Otto
- Music by: Cezary Skubiszewski
- Release date: 1996
- Country: Australia
- Language: English
- Box office: A$524,526 (Australia)

Lilian's Story is a 1996 Australian film based on a 1985 novel by Australian author Kate Grenville, which was inspired by the life of Bea Miles, a famous Sydney nonconformist. The film stars Ruth Cracknell and Toni Collette as Lilian and her younger self, respectively, alongside Barry Otto. Cracknell had been a Shakespearean actress of the stage for many years.

== Plot ==
Lilian Singer spent 40 years imprisoned by her father. Her aunt Kitty and brother John secured her release. Lilian set out to find her place in the world, amidst the urban sprawl of Sydney. Through her back story, we learn how Lilian’s current circumstances came about.

== Cast ==
- Toni Collette as Young Lilian Singer
- Ruth Cracknell as Lilian Singer
- Barry Otto as John Singer
- Anne-Louise Lambert as Mother
- John Flaus as Frank
- Essie Davis as Zara
- Matt Doran as Johnny
- Jeff Truman as Head Orderly
- Kate Agnew as May
- Fiona Press as Ruby
- Susie Lindeman as Jewel
- Fiona Mahl as Alma
- Rachael Maza as Shade
- Bob Maza as Last TaxI Driver
- David Argue as Spruiker
- Maggie Kirkpatrick
- Rachel Szalay as Inmate 1
- Jacqueline Kott as Op Shop Owner

== Reception ==
Variety's review of the picture commended the acting and called it "a touching saga of an eccentric but tenacious woman who’s haunted by demons from her troubled past."

Toni Collette won the Australian Film Institute award for supporting actress for her performance as the young Lilian in this film; the film was also nominated for best score.

This is the first ever movie ingested on Vudu because the contentId tag is number 2 and was added on 2007-10-17 at 23:18:35 according to this metadata. https://apicache.vudu.com/api2/_type/contentSearch/clientType/html5app/contentEncoding/gzip/contentId/2/count/1/followup/advertContentDefinitions/followup/firstVuduableTime
