= Ransom Note (album) =

Studio album by Dear Enemy
- Released: February 1984
- Studio: Sunset Sound Factory
- Genre: Rock; synth-pop
- Label: Capitol, EMI Music
- Producer: Peter McIan

Dear Enemy chronology
| Ransom Note (1984) | The Best of Dear Enemy (Ransom Note & Beyond) (1999) |

Singles from Ransom Note
- 1. "Computer One"/"Day to Day" Released: October 1983; 2. "The Good Life"/"On the Line" Released: February 1984; 3. "Kids on the Street"/"Talking to You" Released: June 1984

Ransom Note is the debut and only studio album by Australian indie-pop group Dear Enemy. Ransom Note peaked at No. 15 in Australia.

The album produced two top forty singles in Australia, including "Computer One", which also reached number 59 on the Billboard US Mainstream Rock chart in March 1984.

== Reception ==
Professional ratings
Review scores
| Source | Rating |
|---|---|
| AllMusic | 1.5/5 stars |

Michael Sutton from AllMusic said "Dear Enemy sounds confused throughout much of Ransom Note, yearning for synth pop while developing an unfortunate crush on radio-friendly mainstream rock. Ron Martini's raspy vocals have an affecting tone on 'Computer One' and 'A Bit of Your Heart'; however, on other tracks it resembles the slick, empty voice of John Parr." Sutton continues "On 'All Through the Night', Dear Enemy can't decide if they want to be Ultravox or an arena band. 'On the Line' aims for Robert Palmer's hard-driving pop but crashes into a heap of clichés. 'The Good Life', 'Talking to You' and 'Restless' would be listenable if 'Computer One' hadn't shown that Dear Enemy was capable of writing better material."

Cash Box magazine said "This techno-pop collection of up-beat rockers might debut on the modern music playlists but is bound to appeal to AOR and Top 40 radio audiences as well. Musically the band is tight, especially keyboardist Martin Fisher, who provides a background melody for Ron Martini's energised vocals and the intricate weaving of the guitars of Les Barker and Chris Langford. Particularly noteworthy are the space age 'Computer One', the mainstream 'Talking to You' and the high voltage 'On the Line'."

== Track listing ==
Side A
| No. | Title | Writer(s) | Length |
|---|---|---|---|
| 1. | "Computer One" | Martin Fisher, Chris Langford | 4:43 |
| 2. | "The Good Life" | Les Barker | 4:28 |
| 3. | "Talking to You" | Peter Leslie | 4:24 |
| 4. | "All Through the Night" | Langford | 6:05 |

Side B
| No. | Title | Writer(s) | Length |
|---|---|---|---|
| 1. | "Kids on the Street" | Langford | 3:26 |
| 2. | "On the Line" | Langford | 3:15 |
| 3. | "Restless" | Langford | 3:59 |
| 4. | "Bit of Your Heart" | Langford | 3:40 |
| 5. | "Day to Day" | Langford | 3:44 |

== Personnel ==
- Peter Leslie – bass, backing vocals
- Ian Morrison - drums
- Chris Langford - backing vocals
- Les Barker - backing vocals
- Martin Fisher - keyboard, backing vocals
- Ron Martini - lead vocals
- Peter McIan - producer

== Charts ==
| Chart (1984) | Peak position |
|---|---|
| Australian Albums (Kent Music Report) | 15 |
