= Jodie Dry =

Australian actress (born 1974)

- Born: 20 January 1974 (age 51)
- Occupation: Television actor

Jodie Dry (born 20 January 1974) is an Australian actress.

== Career ==
She is known for her role as Nicole Brown, a former model and a former girlfriend of Joe Hill, in White Collar Blue; and as Biddy Marchant in ABC's Grassroots, having replaced Sophie Heathcote in the role. She also appeared in the 2001 Network 10 (13 episode) television series, Sit Down, Shut Up, as well in All Saints, Farscape, Stingers and Wildside.

In 2002, Jodie played Sally Diver in a telemovie titled Heroes' Mountain, based on the Thredbo disaster, which also starred Craig McLachlan as Stuart Diver.

In 2023, she appeared in two episodes of Australian soap Neighbours as Tamara Daine.

Dry graduated from the National Institute of Dramatic Art in Australia.

== Filmography ==
=== Film ===
Year	Title	Role	Type
1997	Barry and Garry	Blonde woman	Short film
1998	The Fury Within	Sandy	TV movie
1998	The Venus Factory	Sabrina	Feature film
2001	Hildegarde	Constable Oki	Feature film
2002	Heroes' Mountain	Sally Diver	TV movie
2005	Fingerprints	Woman	Short film
2005	Second Chance	Mel	TV movie
2009	Coffin Rock	Megan	Feature film
2009	A World Away	Camille	Short film
2010	Red	Cinderella	Short film
2013	Double Happiness Uranium	Rebecca	Feature film
2018	The Flip Side	Gail	Feature film

=== Television ===
Year	Title	Role	Type
1997	Big Sky	Detective Gemma Hall	TV series, 1 episode
1997	Spellbinder: Land of the Dragon Lord	Crocodile	TV miniseries, 1 episode
1997–98	Children's Hospital	Charlie	TV series
1999	Wildside	Stephanie	TV series, 1 episode
1999	Farscape	Kyona	TV series, 1 episode
2001	Sit Down, Shut Up	Julia Denholm-Ponsford	TV series, 13 episodes
2000	Beastmaster	Radia	TV series, 1 episode
2000–01	All Saints	Nurse Linda Davies	TV series, 4 episodes
2000, 2004	Stingers	Emily Sullivan / Rebecca Gibson	TV series, 2 episodes
2001	Head Start	Carla Mann	TV miniseries. 2 episodes
2002-03	White Collar Blue	Nicole Brown	TV Series, 44 episodes
2003	Grass Roots	Biddy Marchant	TV series, season 2, 1 episode
2004	McLeod's Daughters	Kirsty Buren	TV series, 1 episode
2005	The Alice	Beverley	TV miniseries, 1 episode
2003–05	Flipper & Lopaka	Voices	Animated TV series, season 3, episode: "The Search for Neptune's Trident"
2013	House Husbands	Allison Paddocks	TV series, 1 episode
2014	Fat Tony & Co.	Petria Knight	TV miniseries, 1 episode
2020	Stateless	Airline Ticket Agent	TV miniseries, 1 episode
2021	Aftertaste	Critic	TV series, 1 episode
2023	Neighbours	Tamara Daine	TV series, 2 episodes
