= Craig Pearce =

Australian screenwriter and actor

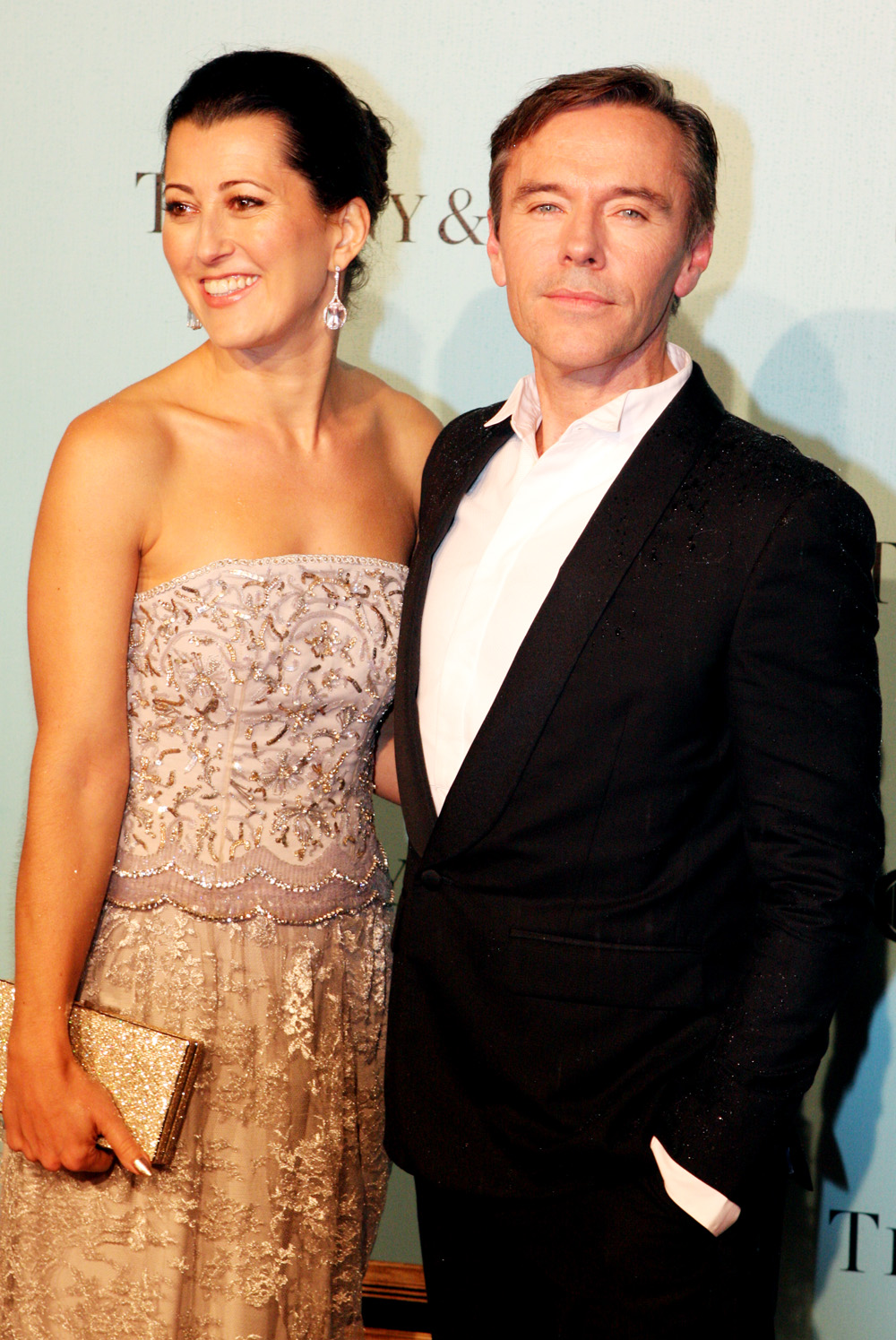
- Emma and Craig Pearce at The Great Gatsby premiere in Sydney in 2013
- Born: 30 November 1961 (age 64)
- Education: Narrabeen Sports High School; National Institute of Dramatic Art
- Occupations: Screenwriter; actor
- Known for: Mad Bomber in Love; E Street
- Spouse(s): Tara Morice (1997–div.); Emma Scott (2012–div.)

Craig Pearce is an Australian screenwriter and actor.

== Early life ==
Pearce was educated at Narrabeen Sports High School with Baz Luhrmann and is a graduate of National Institute of Dramatic Art (NIDA).

== Career ==
Pearce's acting credits include recurring roles in soap operas The Restless Years (1981) and E Street (1993) and children's series The Miraculous Mellops 2 (1992). He made guest appearances in Bellamy (1981), Rafferty's Rules (1987) and G.P. (1989). He had film roles in I Can't Get Started (1985), Nightmaster (1988), To Make a Killing (1988), Mad Bomber in Love (1992) and The Seventh Floor (1994).

As part of the theatre ensemble team 'Six Years Old', Pearce formed a creative partnership with filmmaker Baz Luhrmann, with whom he co-wrote the play Strictly Ballroom as well as the screenplay of the 1992 movie adaptation. He co-wrote the screenplay for the 1996 film Romeo + Juliet, the 2001 film Moulin Rouge!, the 2013 film The Great Gatsby, and the 2022 film Elvis; all with Luhrmann.

He wrote the screenplay for the 2010 film Charlie St. Cloud, starring Zac Efron. He also created the 2017 10-part television series Will, based on the lost years of a young William Shakespeare, which aired on TNT. He also created, wrote and executive produced all six episodes of the 2022 miniseries Pistol, based on Sex Pistols guitarist Steve Jones's autobiography. He also co-wrote the screenplay for the film The Power of the Dark Crystal, which was cancelled, but later adapted into a comic book series in 2017.

Pearce received the Australian Writers' Guild Lifetime Achievement Award in 2016.

== Personal life ==
Pearce has a daughter with Tara Morice.

He married Emma Scott, in 2012, a marriage which ended in divorce.

Pearce divides his time between Sydney, London and Costa Rica.

== Acting credits ==
=== Film ===
Year	Work	Role	Notes
1985	I Can't Get Started	Mark	
1988	Nightmaster		
1988	To Make a Killing	Terry	
1992	Mad Bomber in Love	Bernard Lynch	

=== Television ===
Year	Work	Role	Notes
1980	Spring & Fall	Schoolfriend	1 episode
1981	Menotti		1 episode
1981	Bellamy	Jimmie	1 episode
1981–1982	The Restless Years	Michael Lee	3 episodes
1987	Vietnam	Corporal	Miniseries
1987	Rafferty's Rules	Lyle Jurd	1 episode
1988	Watch the Shadows Dance	Guy Duncan	TV movie
1992	The Miraculous Mellops 2	Grub	13 episodes
1993	G.P.	Mark	1 episode
1993	E Street	Bronco Miles	13 episodes
1994	The Seventh Floor	Ed	TV movie

=== Stage ===
Year	Work	Role	Notes
1983	Peer Gynt	The Boy / Ballon / Hussein / The Gaunt One	NIDA Theatre, Sydney
1984	Welcome the Bright World	Sebastian Ayalti	NIDA Theatre, Sydney
1984	Pericles & The Comedy of Errors	Antiochus / Leonine / Sea Captain	NIDA Theatre, Sydney, Playhouse, Canberra, Community Arts Theatre, Newcastle
1984	Street Scene		NIDA Theatre, Sydney
1985; 1989	Say Goodbye to the Past		Bridge Theatre, Coniston, Stables Theatre, Sydney with Theatre South; Griffin Theatre Company
1985	Even More Wonderful Wollongong		Bridge Theatre, Coniston with Theatre South
1986	Hamlet		Phillip St Theatre, Sydney
1987	Urban Tales of Utter Devotion		Stables Theatre, Sydney with Griffin Theatre Company
1987	Kennedy's Children		Exchange Hotel, Balmain, Sydney with New Mercury Theatre Company
1988	Dangerous Curve		Performance Space, Sydney with Underground Theatre Productions
1988	Haircut		Wharf Theatre, Sydney with STC & Six Years Old Theatre Company
1988	Angels		Wharf Theatre, Sydney with STC & Six Years Old Theatre Company
1989	Romeo and Juliet		Sydney Opera House with STC
1989	New Short Works - Spoleto Fringe Program 1: Grace Among the Christians	Giles	Universal Theatre, Melbourne

== Writing credits ==
=== Film ===
Year	Work	Role	Notes
1992	Strictly Ballroom	Screenplay	
1996	Romeo + Juliet	Screenplay	
2001	Moulin Rouge!	Writer / Soundtrack – lyrics	
2010	Charlie St. Cloud	Screenplay	
2013	The Great Gatsby	Screenplay	
2017	The Power of the Dark Crystal	Screenplay	Cancelled
2022	Elvis	Screenplay	

=== Television ===
Year	Work	Role	Notes
2009	Dancing with the Stars	Soundtrack – lyrics	1 episode
2009	81st Academy Awards	Sketches writer	TV special
2017	Will	Creator / Producer	10 episodes
2022	Pistol	Creator / Executive producer	Miniseries, 6 episodes

=== Stage ===
Year	Work	Role	Notes
1984; 1988	Strictly Ballroom	Writer (Book / Composer)	NIDA Theatre, Sydney, Wharf Theatre, Sydney
2014–2015; 2018–2019, 2023, 2024	Strictly Ballroom the Musical	Writer (Book / Composer)	Sydney Lyric Theatre, Her Majesty's Theatre, Melbourne, Lyric Theatre, Brisbane, Otago Boys High School, Dunedin, Cardinia Cultural Centre, Melbourne, Frankston Arts Centre, Leeds, UK, Toronto, Canada, Piccadilly Theatre, London, Crete Street Theatre, Beenleigh with Beenleigh Theatre Group

== Awards ==
Year	Work	Award	Category	Notes
1992	Strictly Ballroom	Australian Film Institute Awards	Best Screenplay – Original or Adapted	Won
1993	Strictly Ballroom	BAFTA Film Awards	Best Screenplay – Adapted	Nominated
1997	Romeo + Juliet	Online Film & Television Association	Best Writing, Screenplay Based on Material from Another Medium	Nominated
1998	Romeo + Juliet	BAFTA Film Awards	Best Screenplay – Adapted	Won
2002	Moulin Rouge!	BAFTA Film Awards	Best Screenplay – Original	Nominated
2002	Moulin Rouge!	Writers Guild of America Awards	Best Screenplay Written Directly for the Screen	Nominated
2002	Moulin Rouge!	Las Vegas Film Critics Society Awards	Sierra Award for Best Screenplay	Nominated
2002	Moulin Rouge!	Film Critics Circle of Australia Awards	Best Screenplay – Original	Nominated
2013	The Great Gatsby	INOCA Awards	Halfway Award for Best Adapted Screenplay	Nominated
2013	Strictly Ballroom	20/20 Awards	Best Original Screenplay	Nominated
2016	Craig Pearce	Australian Writers' Guild Awards	Lifetime Achievement Award	Honoured
2022	Elvis	AACTA Awards	Best Screenplay in Film	Nominated
2022	Elvis	Australian Film Critics Association Awards	Best Screenplay	Nominated
2023	Elvis	Film Critics Circle of Australia Awards	Best Screenplay	Nominated
2023	Elvis	CinEuphoria Awards	Best Screenplay – International Competition	Nominated
