= I Can't Get Started (film) =

- Directed by: Rodney Fisher
- Written by: Ray Harding
- Produced by: Richard Brennan
- Starring: John Waters; Wendy Hughes; Heather Mitchell; Andrew McFarlane; Nicholas Opolski
- Production company: PBL Productions
- Release date: 1985
- Country: Australia
- Language: English
- Budget: $1.25 million

I Can't Get Started is a 1985 Australian television film about a man who writes a successful novel.

== Cast ==
- John Waters as Robert
- Wendy Hughes as Margaret
- Heather Mitchell as Jill
- Andrew McFarlane as Freddy
- Sandy Gore as Jenny
- Deborah Kennedy as Rose
- Nicholas Opolski as Nicholas
- Ben Gabriel as Lazarus
- Jenny Lovell as Debbie
- Todd Boyce as Anthony
- Mark Owen-Taylor as Kris
- Vanessa Downing as Checkout Girl
- Helmut Bakaitis as Sidney
- John Hannan as David Levings
- Victoria Longley as Amanda
- Craig Pearce as Mark
- Lyndel Rowe as Valerie
