= Dear Enemy (band) =

Australian indie pop band (1980–1988)

- Origin: Melbourne, Victoria, Australia
- Genre: Indie pop
- Years active: 1980–1988
- Labels: EMI; Capitol; Festival
- Past members: see Members list

Dear Enemy were an Australian indie pop band formed in Melbourne in 1980. The band released a studio album, Ransom Note, in 1984 on EMI and Capitol Records that featured its best known single, "Computer One", a No. 15 hit on the Australian Kent Music Report Singles Chart in January 1984. "Computer One" also reached #59 on the Billboard US Mainstream Rock chart in March, 1984. Dear Enemy disbanded in 1988.

== History ==
Dear Enemy began life as a cover band called Stonewall. They started playing original songs and changed their name to Dear Enemy towards the end of 1980. The name for the band came from a Ginger Meggs comic strip - the hero receives letters from his rival which are always addressed to 'Dear Enemy'.

Dear Enemy's original lineup consisted of vocalist Ron Martini, guitarists Chris Langford and Les Barker (ex-Benders), piano player Peter Holden, bass player John Joyce and drummer Ian Morrison. In early 1983, Martin Fisher (keyboards) and Peter Leslie (bass), both ex-Little Heroes, replaced Peter Holden and then-bassist, Nevio Aresca.

The band had a strong following on the live circuit throughout 1981 and 1982, often playing four times a week. In 1983, they signed a recording contract with the American label EMI/Capitol - one of the first Australian bands signed direct to an overseas label. They recorded their debut album Ransom Note in the United States under the guidance of producer Peter McIan (Men at Work, Mondo Rock) - in fact the band were signed with the condition that Peter McIan oversee the recording sessions. The band's debut single was "Computer One", written in America by Langford and Fisher. It proved to be Dear Enemy's one and only major hit, entering the Australian top 100 in October 1983 and peaking at No. 15 in January 1984. The follow-up single, "The Good Life", stalled at No. 39 a few months later, and the slide continued when the third single from the album, "Kids on the Street", failed to chart. Ransom Note sold more than 25,000 units and reached No. 15 on the national album charts.

Dear Enemy released a new single a few months later with "New Hero", which featured on the soundtrack to the Australian motion picture Street Hero. The single however only reached No. 93 on the charts. A couple of lineup changes, with Joey Amenta replacing Barker in April 1985, and two more flop singles, "Stay" and "You're Right, You're Right", followed over the next four years before Dear Enemy called it a day at the end of 1988. The band did record tracks for a second album during this period but due to contract and legal problems the album did not see the light of day.

Les Barker and Chris Langford formed the band Among Thieves with vocalist Anton Morgenthaler and keyboardist Sam Panetta, and released a self-titled album in 1992.

Ron Martini also released a CD entitled Big Night Out in 1996 with backing band the Missiles of Love.

In 1999, EMI released the CD Best of Dear Enemy (Ransom Note and Beyond), which was a compilation of all the band's releases.

== Members ==
- Ron Martini - lead vocal (1980–1988)
- Les Barker - lead guitar, vocals (1980–1985)
- Chris Langford - guitar, vocals, harmonica (1980–1988)
- Peter Holden - keyboards (1980–1982)
- John Joyce - bass, vocals (1980–1982)
- Nevio Aresca - bass (1982–1983)
- Ian Morrison - drums (1980–1988)
- Martin Fisher - keyboards (1983–1988)
- Peter Leslie - bass (1983–1988)
- Joey Amenta - guitar (1985)
- Jerry Leigh - guitar
- Broc O'Connor - guitar (1988)

== Discography ==
=== Albums ===
Year	Title	Peak chart positions
Year	Title	AUS
1984	Ransom Note: Released: February 1984; Label: Capitol Records (ST12295)	15
1999	The Best of Dear Enemy (Ransom Note & Beyond): Released: 1999; Label: EMI (724352320028)	-

=== Singles ===
Year	Title	Peak chart positions		Album
Year	Title	AUS	US Rock	Album
1983	"Computer One"/"Day to Day"	15	59	Ransom Note
1984	"The Good Life"/"On the Line"	39	-	Ransom Note
1984	"Kids on the Street"/"Talking to You"	-	-	Ransom Note
1984	"New Hero"/"Billy's Theme"	93	-	Street Hero (soundtrack)
1986	"Stay"/"Looking for Love"	61	-	The Best of Dear Enemy (Ransom Note & Beyond)
1988	"You're Right, You're Right"/"Love Flows"	-	-	The Best of Dear Enemy (Ransom Note & Beyond)
