= Myriam François =

British journalist and filmmaker (born 1982)

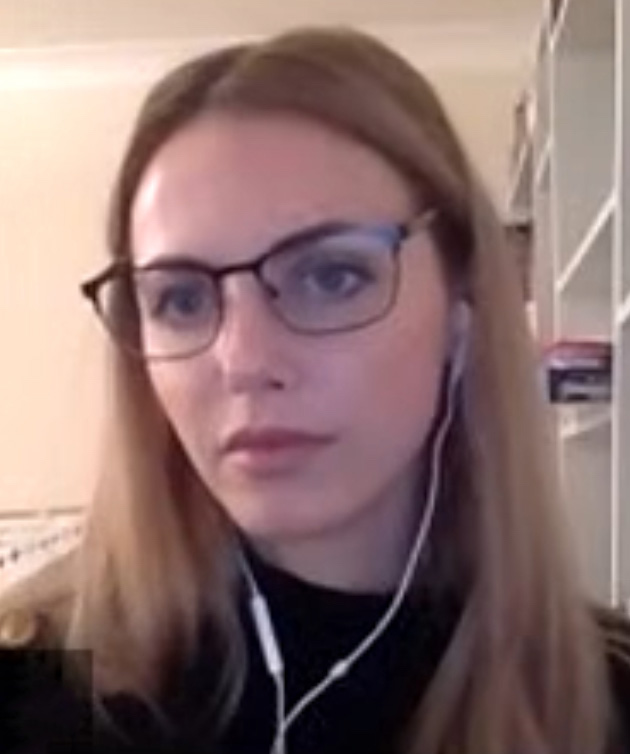
- François in 2020
- Born: Emilie Siobhan Geoghegan François; December 1982 (age 43); Camden, London, England
- Education: University of Cambridge (BA); Georgetown University (MA); University of Oxford (DPhil)
- Occupations: Journalist, filmmaker, writer
- Website: myriamfrancois.com

Emilie Siobhan Geoghegan François (born December 1982), known as Myriam François and formerly as Myriam François-Cerrah, is a British journalist, filmmaker and writer. Her work has appeared on the BBC, Channel 4 and Al Jazeera. She is the founder and CEO of production company MPWR Productions, which specialises in documentary films centred on minority voices.

== Early life, early career and education ==
François was born in Camden, London, to an Irish mother and a French father. She attended a French school in London and is bilingual. She was born Emilie François, but has used Myriam instead of her given name since she became a Muslim in 2003.

François was a child actress, whose performance as Margaret Dashwood in the Oscar-winning film Sense and Sensibility (1995) earned her critical acclaim. She went on to appear in Paws (1997), alongside Billy Connolly and Nathan Cavaleri, and in New Year's Day (2001).

François holds an MA from Georgetown University (United States) and a BA from the University of Cambridge (UK). She completed her DPhil at Oxford University, focusing on Islamic movements in Morocco in 2017.

== Career ==
François was an assistant editor and features writer at Emel magazine (2008–2009) and worked at the Islam Channel in London. She translated Asma Lamrabet's book, Women in the Qur’an: An Emancipatory Reading which won the English Pen Award.

François began her career in documentary filmmaking as a presenter and producer at the BBC. Her first documentary on BBC One, A Deadly Warning: Srebrenica Revisited (2015), was nominated for the Sandford St Martin Religious Programming Award in 2016. In 2016, she presented her second documentary, The Muslim Pound (2016), which explores the growing consumer goods market for Muslims in the UK. She was also a programme researcher and presenter at the BBC and a regular guest on its flagship channel's The Big Questions from 2008 to 2011 and on Sunday Morning Live also in 2015. François then worked as a programme producer on Al Jazeera English's Head to Head.

In 2017, François presented The Truth About Muslim Marriage (Channel 4, 2017), which was nominated for Best Investigative Documentary at the Asian Media Awards in 2018. François then joined TRT World as Europe correspondent, covering European breaking news. Between 2017 and 2018, she also developed, produced and presented Compass, a monthly arts and culture documentary for the channel.

In 2019, François left TRT World and began working with BBC World Service, where she produced and presented a series of short documentaries, including Tariq Ramadan: #MeToo in the Muslim World (2018), and Is Brexit-Voting Llanelli Changing Its Mind? (2019) which looks at the impact of Brexit in Llanelli, a Leave-voting town in Wales. In 2019, her documentary City of Refuge, which examined the plight of Syrian refugees in Lebanon, aired on BBC Radio 4 in April and on BBC World service in May. In 2022, she presented the BBC World Service audio documentary When Rape Becomes a Crime, which focuses on rape laws in Senegal. François also began hosting and producing The Big Picture: France in Focus, a four-part series for Al Jazeera English focused on the fault lines within French society.

=== Writing ===
François was a correspondent for the Huffington Post (2014–2015), where she broke a headline story on an exclusive 36-page document written by alleged al-Qaeda kingpin Khalid Sheikh Mohammed. She has appeared on Newsnight (2009), 4thought.tv (2011), BBC News (2010), Crosstalk (2010), BBC Radio (2012), Sky News and documentaries including Divine Women, presented by Bettany Hughes.

A former columnist at the New Statesman, François's writing has featured in the British press, including The Guardian, TIME, Foreign Policy, The Telegraph, CNN online and Middle East Eye.

François is a former senior fellow at the Center for Global Policy (CGP), a think tank where, between 2019 and 2020, she produced an in-depth report looking at the plight of European children of ISIS fighters in camps in Northern Syria, as well as an accompanying piece for Foreign Policy. She has been an outspoken critic of Islamophobia. She is a former research associate at School of Oriental and African Studies at the University of London (SOAS), in the Department of the Languages and Cultures of the Near and Middle East, where she researched issues related to British Muslims, integration, and racism.

Her articles also appeared in The Huffington Post, New Statesman, Your Middle East, The London Paper, Jadaliyya, the Australian Broadcasting Corporation, The Daily Telegraph, Salon, Index on Censorship, The F-Word, and the magazine Emel.

=== Other work ===
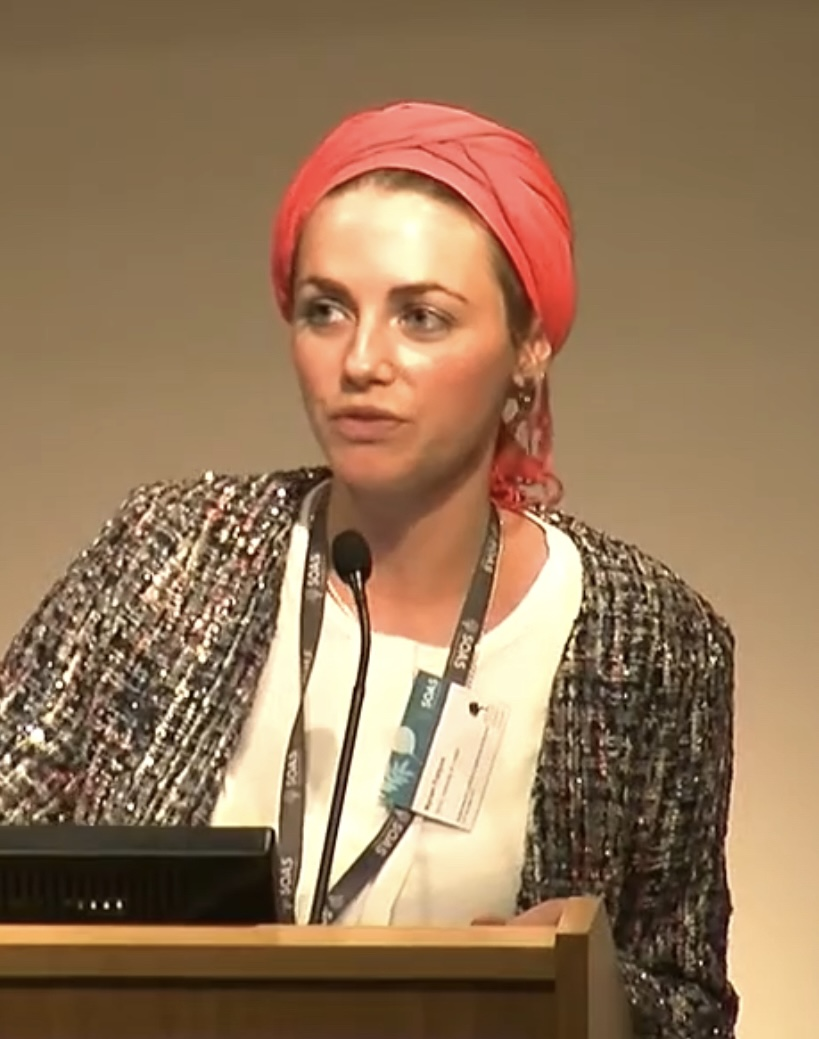
François in 2015

François gave guest lectures at Harvard University (2014), the University of Birmingham (2014), and Luther College (2015) in Decorah, Iowa, and presented an annual guest lecture at Kingston University, in England, in 2012–2014. She spoke at the 2015 HowTheLightsGetsIn at the Hay-on-Wye Festival. She has been a regular presenter at high-profile events, including the Mayor of London's Eid Festival 2019 and the London Modest Fashion Festival 2018.

She was a judge for the 2019 Baillie Gifford Prize for non-fiction books.

== Personal life ==
In 2003, at the age of 21, François became a Muslim after graduating from Cambridge. At the time, she was a sceptical Roman Catholic. She rejects the use of the words "convert" and "revert" as "exclusionary", describing herself as "just Muslim".

François chose to stop wearing a hijab in the late 2010s. She said that the subsequent lack of Islamophobia due to her being a white woman in Western attire made her feel enmeshed in white privilege. Nevertheless, she did not decide to return to the hijab.

As of 2015, François was married to a Turkish man. By early 2022, they had divorced.

== Filmography ==
- Sense and Sensibility, 1995, (Margaret Dashwood)
- A Deadly Warning: Srebrenica Revisited, BBC One, 2015 (presenter)
- The Muslim Pound, BBC One, 2016 (presenter)
- The Truth About Muslim Marriage, Channel 4, 2017 (presenter)
- Compass series, TRT World, 2018–19 (presenter/producer)
  - Witnesses of Stone
  - Crafting an Identity - 'Britishness' After Brexit
  - Art Against All Odds
- France in Focus series, Al Jazeera English, 2022 (presenter/producer)
  - The Big Picture
  - Flirting with the Far Right
  - The Legacy of Colonialism in France
- Finding Aicha, BBC's Our World/BBC Arabic/CBC, 2023 (director/producer)
