= Grass Roots (TV series) =

Australian television series (2000–2003)

- Genre: Comedy; Drama
- Created by: Geoffrey Atherden
- Written by: Geoffrey Atherden; Katherine Thompson; Michael Brindley
- Directed by: Peter Andrikidis
- Starring: Geoff Morrell; Zoe Carides; John Clayton; Rhondda Findleton; Sacha Horler; Rhys Muldoon
- Country of origin: Australian
- Original language: English
- No. of seasons: 2
- No. of episodes: 18

Production
- Executive producer: Tim Pye
- Producer: John Eastway
- Running time: 50 minutes

Original release
- Network: ABC
- Release: 1 July 2000 – 21 May 2003

Grass Roots is an Australian television series produced by the Australian Broadcasting Corporation between 2000 and 2003.

== Synopsis ==
The series is set around the fictional Arcadia Waters Council (LGA) near Sydney, and was primarily a satirical look at the machinations of local government. It was written by Geoffrey Atherden.

== Production ==
Part of the series was filmed in the inner west Sydney suburb of Concord. Many external shots of Arcadia Waters Council chambers used Concord Council Chambers as a setting. The Council Chambers themselves (external shots, and the "Site Shed" Scenes, plus a couple of other external scenes) were filmed in a Factory at the end of Mars Road Lane Cove. Other various locations around Concord, particularly in the shopping centre and cafes in Majors Bay Road were used. Beach scenes were filmed at Mona Vale, New South Wales on Sydney's northern beaches, while the location "Cemetery Point" was filmed at the Mona Vale headland reserve.

== Series overview ==
Series	Episodes	Originally released	
Series	Episodes	First released	Last released
1	8	2 July 2000	20 August 2000
2	10	19 March 2003	21 May 2003

== Cast ==
=== Main / regular ===
- Geoff Morrell as Col Dunkley
- Zoe Carides as Liz Murray
- John Clayton as Harry Bond
- Rhondda Findleton as Karin Schumaker
- Sophie Heathcote (Season 1) and Jodie Dry (Season 2) as Biddy Marchant
- Sacha Horler as Helen Mansoufis (Season 1, Season 2 - 2 episodes)
- Rhys Muldoon as Greg Dominelli
- Chris Haywood as George Hasnakov
- Michael Craig as Gordon Mahon
- Sandy Gore as Salwah Mandinkis
- Matthew Newton (Season 1) as Derek Garner
- Lucy Bell (Season 2) as Emily Bell
- Pauline Chan (Season 1) and Theresa Wong (Season 2) as Irene Cheung
- Melissa Jaffer (Season 1) and Kerry Walker (Season 2) as Fran Smith
- Nicholas Papademetriou as Victor Trujillo
- Judi Farr as Janice Corniglio
- Tara Morice as Julie Dunkley
- Mary Coustas as Ava Strick (Season 2)
- John Gregg as Morgan Bartok
- Tammy MacIntosh as Marilyn Hennessy (Season 1)
- Peter Kowitz as Warwick Marchant / Rev. Peter Summerhaze (10 episodes)
- Alan Cinis as Justin Thyer
- Mitchell Butel as Max Werring

=== Guests ===
- Aaron Blabey as Sandy Maxwell (1 episode)
- Aaron Pedersen as Joe Ventimiglia (2 episodes)
- Arky Michael as Des (1 episode)
- Chelsea Brown as Stephanie Gruen (2 episodes)
- Denise Roberts as Evelyn Savage / Christina (2 episodes)
- John Brumpton as Mr Brain (2 episodes)
- Lani Tupu as Lynton Aubrey (2 episodes)
- Penne Hackforth-Jones as Lani Leonard (1 episode)
- Rachel Szalay as Judith (1 episode)
- Russell Dykstra as Bill Hooks (1 episode)
- Tina Bursill as Ariadne Totos (1 episode)
- Tiriel Mora as David (3 episodes)

== Episodes ==
=== Season 1 (2000) ===
No. overall	No. in series	Title	Directed by	Written by	Original release date
1	1	"A Week In September"	Peter Andrikidis	Geoffrey Atherden	2 July 2000
2	2	"Late September"	Peter Andrikidis	Geoffrey Atherden	9 July 2000
3	3	"October to March"	Peter Andrikidis	Geoffrey Atherden	16 July 2000
4	4	"February To May"	Peter Andrikidis	Katherine Thompson	23 July 2000
5	5	"January To April"	Peter Andrikidis	Geoffrey Atherden	30 July 2000
6	6	"April To July"	Peter Andrikidis	Michael Brindley	6 August 2000
7	7	"Late July Friday 4:00 pm To 10:30 pm"	Peter Andrikidis	Geoffrey Atherden	13 August 2000
8	8	"The Whole Year"	Peter Andrikidis	Geoffrey Atherden	20 August 2000

=== Season 2 (2003) ===
No. overall	No. in series	Title	Directed by	Written by	Original release date
1	1	"Art"	Peter Andrikidis	Geoffrey Atherden	19 March 2003
2	2	"Prostitution"	Peter Andrikidis	Geoffrey Atherden	26 March 2003
3	3	"Garbage"	Peter Andrikidis	Geoffrey Atherden	2 April 2003
4	4	"Crime"	Peter Andrikidis	Geoffrey Atherden	9 April 2003
5	5	"Dogs"	Peter Andrikidis	Michael Brindley	16 April 2003
6	6	"Egomania"	Peter Andrikidis	Geoffrey Atherden	23 April 2003
7	7	"Youth"	Peter Andrikidis	Geoffrey Atherden	30 April 2003
8	8	"Cars"	Peter Andrikidis	Michael Brindley	7 May 2003
9	9	"Investigation"	Peter Andrikidis	Michael Brindley	14 May 2003
10	10	"By-election"	Peter Andrikidis	Geoffrey Atherden	21 May 2003
