= Children's Hospital (Australian TV series) =

Australian television series

Children's Hospital is an Australian television series that screened on the ABC in 1997 and 1998. There was one series of 13 episodes produced. The series was set in a busy inner-city children's hospital. It followed the stories of the hospital staff, the young patients and their concerned families.

== Cast ==
=== Main ===
- Deborah Galanos as Meredith/ Dr Meredith George
- Ian Stenlake as James
- Jodie Dry as Charlie
- Rachel Szalay as Kris
- Gennie Nevinson as Pam
- Hugh Baldwin as Dave
- Ling-Hsueh Tang as Tina
- Paula Arundell as Claire
- Jamie Jackson as Peter

=== Guests ===
- Alan David Lee as Terry Voyt (1 episode)
- Brittany Byrnes as Helen Voyt (1 episode)
- Firass Dirani as Marc (1 episode)
- John Howard as Len Larkin (1 episode)
- Kate Sheil as Maureen (1 episode)
- Lorna Lesley as Glenda Reynolds (1 episode)
- Peter Whitford as Surgical specialist (1 episode)
- Rhiana Griffith as Kelly (1 episode)
- Sam Healy as Tamara (1 episode)
- Scott McGregor as Ray Reynolds (1 episode)
- Susie Porter as Frances Clark (1 episode)
- The Wiggles as themselves (1 episode, lost media)

== See also ==
- List of Australian television series
