= In the Winter Dark (film) =

- Directed by: James Bogle
- Written by: James Bogle; Peter Rasmussen (filmmaker); Tim Winton
- Based on: novel by Tim Winton
- Produced by: Rosemary Blight
- Starring: Brenda Blethyn; Ray Barrett; Richard Roxburgh
- Cinematography: Martin McGrath
- Edited by: Suresh Ayyar
- Music by: Peter Cobbin
- Production company: Goalpost Pictures
- Release date: 1998
- Running time: 92 min
- Country: Australia
- Language: English
- Box office: A$100,635 (Australia)

In the Winter Dark is a 1998 Australian feature film adaptation of the 1988 novel by Tim Winton, which was released by Goalpost Pictures on 10 September 1998. It starred Brenda Blethyn, Ray Barrett, Richard Roxburgh and Miranda Otto and was directed by James Bogle.

In The Winter Dark was nominated for three Australian Film Institute Awards, for Best Actor (Ray Barrett) and Best Supporting Actress (Miranda Otto), and Best Cinematography.

== Cast ==
- Brenda Blethyn as Ida Stubbs
- Ray Barrett as Maurice Stubbs
- Richard Roxburgh as Murray Jacob
- Miranda Otto as Ronnie
- Steve Le Marquand as Nick
- Justin Monjo as Circus Man
- Les Dayman as Minister
- Marjorie Child as Cat Woman

== Reviews ==
Andrew Urban wrote: "Superbly made in every respect, In the Winter Dark is as tough as the Australian bush on one hand, yet as sensitive as a pregnant girl on the other; a rich if puzzling film that introduces Bogle as a fascinating new filmmaking talent."

David Stratton wrote: "Bogle’s handsomely produced film is completely successful in exploring a mysterious, threatening environment peopled by a quartet of seriously disturbed characters. Comparisons can be made to Samantha Lang’s 1997 “The Well,” a similarly bleak tale of psychological frissons, and those who were unable to tune into the Lang film will probably have similar problems with Bogle’s chiller."

Cinephilia wrote that "given that this was shot in under 6 weeks and helmed by a director on his first major feature this is an impressive effort even if its potential is not fully realized."

Paula Nechak wrote: "In the Winter Dark is too internalized and segregated to rate as a successful film. Because we see from Maurice's eye and through his mental state of being it's near impossible to find the perspective (or the compassion and empathy) that would allow us access to the other characters."

Film Threat wrote: "The story is unstructured at times and leaves numerous plot elements unexplained. Martin McGrath’s cinematography of rural Australia is phenomenal and complements Bogle’s directing to create this harrowing portrayal of the dark side of human madness."
