= An Indecent Obsession (film) =

- Poster
- Directed by: Lex Marinos
- Written by: Denise Morgan
- Based on: novel by Colleen McCullough
- Starring: Wendy Hughes; Gary Sweet; Richard Moir
- Production company: PBL Productions
- Release date: 1985
- Country: Australia
- Language: English
- Budget: A$2.1 million

An Indecent Obsession is a 1985 Australian film based on the 1981 novel of the same name by Colleen McCullough. It was shot on location at Lord Howe Island.

== Cast ==
- Wendy Hughes – Honour Langtry
- Gary Sweet – Michael Wilson
- Richard Moir – Luce Daggett
- Bruno Lawrence – Matt Sawyer
- Bill Hunter – Colonel Chinstrap
- Marina Finlay – Sue Peddar
- Julia Blake – Matron

== Release ==
The film was released on DVD with a new print by Umbrella Entertainment in April 2013. The DVD includes special features such as the theatrical trailer and exclusive interview with Wendy Hughes.
