= Rachel Szalay =

Australian actress and artist

- Born: January 1965 (age 61)
- Education: City Art Institute (1983–1985); National Institute of Dramatic Art (1986–1988)
- Occupations: Actress and visual artist
- Known for: The Delinquents (1989); Children's Hospital (1997–1998)

Rachel Szalay (born January 1965) is an Australian actress and visual artist.

== Early life ==
Szalay was born in January 1965. From 1983 to 1985, she studied visual art at City Art Institute. In 1986, she then began studying an acting diploma at the National Institute of Dramatic Art in Sydney, graduating in 1988.

== Career ==
Szalay has appeared in numerous stage roles, including a production of The Importance of Being Earnest as Cecily Cardew, which she joined in 1990. The production was so popular that it became an ongoing stage show between 1988 and 1992, and was televised by the ABC.

Her film credits include roles in The Delinquents (1989), Mad Bomber in Love (1992) and Lilian's Story (1996). She also has several television credits to her name, including a recurring role as Kris in Children's Hospital and guest roles in A Country Practice, Six Pack and Grass Roots.

Szalay is also an accomplished visual artist, who uses a variety of mediums to capture the Australian bush and its unique flora and fauna. She has showcased her art in numerous exhibitions since 1986, and started staging solo shows from 1994.

== Personal life ==
Szalay resides in the Blue Mountains, in New South Wales.

== Acting credits ==
=== Film ===
Year	Title	Role	Notes
1989	The Delinquents	Maxine	
1992	Mad Bomber in Love	Julia	
1994	Unacceptable Behaviour	Wendy	Short film
1996	Lilian's Story	Inmate One	

=== Television ===
Year	Title	Role	Notes
1989	A Country Practice	Stephanie Kouros	2 episodes
1992	Six Pack	Nicole	1 episode
1992	The Importance of Being Earnest	Cecile Cardew	TV movie
1997–1998	Children's Hospital	Kris	6 episodes
2000	Grass Roots	Judith	1 episode

=== Stage ===
Year	Title	Role	Notes
1985	Hot’l Baltimore		NIDA Theatre, Sydney
1987	The Man Who Came to Dinner		NIDA Theatre, Sydney
1988	Veneer 1		NIDA Theatre, Sydney
1988	The Screens	Mother	NIDA Theatre, Sydney
1988	Fifth of July		NIDA Theatre, Sydney
1990	Reckless		Belvoir St Theatre, Sydney with Bophtelophti Theatre for Sydney Festival
1990	Once in a Lifetime		Sydney Opera House with STC
1990–1992	The Importance of Being Earnest	Cecily Cardew	Sydney Opera House, Playhouse, Adelaide, Comedy Theatre, Melbourne, His Majesty's Theatre, Perth, Theatre Royal Sydney with STC & MTC
1991	The Dreamer Examines his Pillow	Donna	Wharf Theatre, Sydney with STC
1991; 1994	Furious	Lynnie / Friend One	Wharf Theatre, Sydney, Space Theatre, Adelaide, Malthouse Theatre, Melbourne with STC & Playbox Theatre Company
1992	Time and the Room		Wharf Theatre, Sydney with STC
1993	Top Girls		Wharf Theatre, Sydney with STC
1994	That Eye, The Sky	Alice Flack	Stanley Palmer Cultural Centre, Sydney, Playhouse, Melbourne with Burning House Theatre Company
1996	Playgrounds		Wharf Theatre, Sydney with STC
1996	The Incorruptible	Louise Porter	Canberra Theatre, Sydney Opera House with STC Playbox Theatre Company & Canberra Theatre Trust
1998	Mourning Becomes Electra		Wharf Theatre, Sydney with STC
1998	Navigating		Sydney Opera House with STC
2002	Svetlana in Slingbacks		Belvoir St Theatre, Sydney
2004	Boston Marriage	Claire	Space Theatre, Adelaide with STCSA

=== Radio ===
Year	Title	Role	Notes
	Sixteen Words for Water		ABC Radio
1998; 2005	Flame		ABC Radio radio play
1999	The Twentieth Century and the Dream	Reader	ABC Classic FM's "The Listening Room" radio play
	Sylvia Plath		ABC Radio
	Poetica		ABC Radio
	Background Briefing	Readings	ABC Radio radio show
