= Warm Nights on a Slow Moving Train =

- Directed by: Bob Ellis
- Written by: Bob Ellis; Denny Lawrence
- Produced by: Ross Dimsey; Patric Juillet
- Starring: Wendy Hughes; Colin Friels; Norman Kaye
- Cinematography: Yuri Sokol
- Edited by: Tim Lewis
- Music by: Peter Sullivan
- Release dates: 10 March 1988 (Australia); 31 March 1989 (U.S.)
- Running time: 130 minutes (original cut); 118 minutes (director's cut); 91 minutes (theatrical cut)
- Country: Australia
- Language: English
- Budget: A$2.5 million

Warm Nights on a Slow Moving Train is a 1988 Australian film directed by Bob Ellis and starring Wendy Hughes, Colin Friels, and Norman Kaye. Nominated at the AFI Awards in the Best Achievement in Cinematography (Yuri Sokol) category.

== Premise ==
While working as a prostitute on the weekend train to Sydney, Jenny (Wendy Hughes) meets The Man (Colin Friels), who seduces her so that she will murder for him.

== Cast ==
- Wendy Hughes as Jenny Nicholson aka. The Girl
- Colin Friels as The Man
- Norman Kaye as Salesman
- John Clayton as Football coach
- Rod Zuanic as Young soldier
- Lewis Fitz-Gerald as Brian
- Peter Whitford as Steward

== Production ==
Bob Ellis said the idea for the film came to Denny Lawrence as he and Ellis were travelling on a train and they wrote the script together. Ellis said "the idea was that each client would be some part of the Australian male".

Ellis called the film "a mix of Pinter and Hitchcock. An erotic thriler - well, not too erotic, but somewhat thrilling."

Ellis said funding of the film was dependent on casting Wendy Hughes, who he always thought was miscast, although he says her performance was excellent and she was a joy to work with.

== Release ==
The film was greatly shortened by producer Ross Dimsey and Ellis described the making of the movie as one of the worst experiences of his life. Ellis:

It was one of the best scripts I've ever written. We made the grave error of agreeing to let Dimsey produce it and then the worse error of moving the whole thing to Melbourne. So I was away from home. And there was this whole 10 BA set-up with shifty lawyers who, I didn't know, had kind of agreed to fire me at a certain point if I fulfilled certain expectations. Which I didn't. But I got fired quite late in the day and then 64 laughs, by my count, were removed. It wasn't meant to be funny, but it was a viable experience. I had Yuri Sokol shooting it. He's a wonderful cameraman but he's an awful bastard and he would sometimes light with candles... It was a nasty experience, as nasty as I've experienced. So it really ditched me as a director. Because it would have been - had my cut, which fortunately several people like Al Finney and Bob Weiss saw and said it would have been the best Australian film - had my cut survived and been shown (but it was burnt with our house), I would have then had a directing career not unlike that of, say, Simon Wincer where I would have had some credibility overseas and so on.

== See also ==
- Cinema of Australia
