= James Bogle =

Australian filmmaker

James Bogle (born 1959) is an Australian director and writer of films and TV.

== Select Credits ==
- Kadaicha (1988)
- Mad Bomber in Love (1992)
- In the Winter Dark (1998)
- Closed for Winter (2009)
