= Deirdre Cash =

Australian novelist and singer 1924–1963

- Born: Deidre Cash; 16 July 1924; Albert Park, Victoria, Australia
- Died: 11 March 1963 (aged 38); Melbourne, Victoria, Australia
- Other name: Criena Rohan
- Education: Melba Conservatorium of Music
- Occupations: Novelist, dancer, singer
- Known for: The Delinquents

Deirdre Cash (16 July 1924 – 11 March 1963) was an Australian novelist, dancer and torch singer, who wrote under her Irish pseudonym Criena Rohan. Her first novel, The Delinquents, that was set in Brisbane, was published in London and described by the Daily Mail as a "back-street Tristan and Isolde".

== Background ==
Deirdre Cash was born on 16 July 1924 in Albert Park, Victoria into an Irish-Australian Catholic family. Her father Leo Evaristus Cash, a salesman, had been active in the 1930s New Theatre movement in Melbourne, while her mother Valerie (née Walsh) was an operetta singer. Her parents separated when Valerie and her younger brother were still young. They were brought up by relatives in Calca, South Australia and then by unmarried aunts in Melbourne.

== Education and singing ==
Deirdre boarded at the Convent of Mercy, Mornington, Victoria. After matriculating, Deirdre enrolled at what became the Melba Conservatorium of Music. On 4 February 1948, she married Michael Damian Blackall, a law student, but left her husband and young son to earn a living as a torch singer and teacher of ballroom dancing in Melbourne. She remarried in 1956, to a coastal seaman, Otto Ole Distler Olsen, with whom she lived at various ports.

== Writing ==
Cash turned to full-time writing after a bout of illness. Her first book The Delinquents (1962), set in Brisbane, was published in London under the pseudonym Criena Rohan. It was well-received in the London press: the Times Literary Supplement called Lola's characterization "a triumph". In 1989 the book was turned into a teenage cult film, directed by Chris Thomson and starring Kylie Minogue and Charlie Schlatter.

According to a recent literary history of Queensland, the novel was "of a tradition of critical social realism... largely absent from 'home-grown' Brisbane writing in the postwar decades." It notes "the crisp authenticity of the dialogue". The novel was reissued in 2014 by a Melbourne publisher, with an introduction by the fellow Australian novelist Nick Earls.

Cash published her second novel Down by the Dockside, set in Melbourne, in 1963. A possible third work in manuscript, The House with the Golden Door, has never been found. She died of colonic carcinoma in Melbourne on 11 March 1963, aged 38, leaving a husband, a daughter by her second marriage, and a son by her first.
