= Boundaries of the Heart =

- Directed by: Lex Marinos
- Written by: Peter Yeldham
- Produced by: Patric Juillet; Antony I. Ginnane (executive)
- Starring: Wendy Hughes; John Hargreaves; Norman Kaye
- Release date: 1988
- Country: Australia
- Language: English
- Budget: A$3.5 million

Boundaries of the Heart is a 1988 film starring Wendy Hughes.

It was shot in Coolgardie, near Kalgoorlie in Western Australia.

== Plot ==
Shearer Andy (John Hargreaves) returns to Coolgardie, as he's done every year since he was a young shearer. Stella (Wendy Hughes) welcomes Andy warmly but her interest cools as old tensions between them are renewed. A young English schoolteacher finds himself stranded when his car breaks down. Stella helps him recover from sunstroke and seduces him. Andy realises that Stella has used him for years, playing his attentions off against any man who takes her fancy. He decides to sell his horses and truck and leave for Sydney.

== Cast ==
- Wendy Hughes as Stella Marsden
- John Hargreaves as Andy Ford
- Norman Kaye as Billy Marsden
- Max Cullen as Blanco White
- Michael Siberry as Arthur Pearson
- John Clayton as Sergeant Riley
- Julie Nihill as June Thompson
- Vivienne Garrett as Freda

== Stella ==
The movie was based on Stella, a 1963 British TV play. It was written by Australian Peter Yeldham and features several Australians in the cast.

=== Premise ===
Stella, a barmaid, is turning 40 and reflects on her life.

=== Cast ===
- Katherine Blake as Stella
- Duncan Lamont
- Reg Lye as Blanco White
- Joseph O'Conor as Billy
- Charles Tingwell as Arthur Pearson
- Wendy Gifford as June Thompson

=== Production ===
It was inspired by a person in a bar Yeldham saw when seventeen.

The play was well received and screened in a number of countries.

The play was adapted for radio in 1964.

== Release ==
The film went straight to video, via distributor Filmpac, but the only versions available were cropped in 4:3 format.
