= Luigi's Ladies =

- Directed by: Judy Morris
- Written by: Judy Morris; Wendy Hughes
- Starring: Judy Morris; Wendy Hughes; Sandy Gore; David Rappaport
- Release date: 11 May 1989
- Running time: 91 minutes
- Country: Australia
- Language: English
- Budget: A$2,825,000
- Box office: A$60,814 (Australia)

Luigi's Ladies is a 1989 Australian comedy directed by actor Judy Morris. It was the final film of actor David Rappaport.

== Cast ==
- David Rappaport as Luigi
- Judy Morris as The Director
- Wendy Hughes as Sara
- Sandy Gore as Cee
- Serge Lazareff as Trevor 'Trev'
- John Walton as Steve
- Robert Mammone as Tony
- Genevieve Lemon as Debbo
- Ric Hutton as Lord Timothy
