= Remember Me (1985 film) =

- Based on: an idea by Bob Ellis
- Written by: Anne Brooksbank
- Directed by: Lex Marinos
- Starring: Wendy Hughes; Richard Moir; Robert Grubb
- Music by: Sharon Calcraft
- Country of origin: Australia
- Original language: English

Production
- Producer: Patric Juillet
- Editor: Philip Howe
- Running time: 94 minutes
- Production companies: James Hardie Finance Ltd. McElroy & McElroy; Taft Hardie Group; Australian Film Commission

Original release
- Release: 1985

Remember Me is a 1985 Australian mystery, thriller television film about a woman pursued by her ex-husband. Produced by James Hardie Finance Ltd., McElroy & McElroy, Taft Hardie Group and Australian Film Commission. Directed by Lex Marinos and written by Anne Brooksbank based on an idea by Bob Ellis. The film features an ensemble cast including Wendy Hughes, Jenny Ellis, Jack Ellis, Robert Grubb, Kris McQuade, Kati Edwards, Liz Chance, Richard Moir, Charlotte Haywood, Peter Gwynne, Carol Raye, John Doyle, Sandy Gore, Bob Ellis, David Slingsby, Helen McDonald, and Celia De Burgh.

This film's original title name is ‘Should Auld Acquaintance Be Forgot’ but they changed the title to ‘Remember Me’ after script updates. ‘Should Auld Acquaintance Be Forgot’, is a lyric from ‘Auld Lang Syne’, a famous song and poem about farewell.

== Plot ==
Jenny Richardson and her husband, Geoff, have a peaceful family with a son, Michael, and a daughter. After being delayed with a flat tyre, she drops her kids at school and goes to work at the Eastern Suburbs Welfare Centre. Her job is to listen to her clients, communicate with them, and try to solve their troubles. This brings her lots of weird stories.

Jenny receives a phone call while she is working from her ex-husband, Howard, they have been divorced for nine years and he has been in a mental institution. He claims he has re-established himself in his old work. He tries to get her to meet him but she refuses.

A series of scenes show Jenny carrying on with her day from the perspective of an unknown watcher peering behind bushes and through windows. Jenny seems paranoid she is being watched.

Howard continues to call Jenny at work and eventually convinces her to have lunch. Their lunch meeting is tense and uncomfortable. He claims that his mental issues have been cured with medication, two tablets a day. However, he still seems neurotic and scares Jenny a few times. Geoff is also in the park where they had lunch and when he asks later who she was with, she lies.

From then on, Jenny has nightmares about her past with Howard and her childhood. This includes her as a child seeing a body hanging from a tree.

One day, Jenny's parents are visiting and the family are all playing at the beach behind the Richardson home. Jenny's mother sees someone at the house but when Jenny goes to investigate she can't find anyone. She does reminisce about her and Howard however.

Jenny runs into Howard at an art gallery event. Howard offers to buy her a drink either there or later but she refuses. When she tries to show her friend that he's here he appears to have disappeared. As she leaves he approaches her and they kiss briefly before Jenny reconsiders it. However, he continues to reappear in her life and write her letters, and they rekindle their relationship.

Jenny becomes increasingly conflicted about the affair resulting in fights with Geoff and her continued mental decline. On one of their meetings, Howard says that had he gotten out of the mental institution in the first few years he would have killed her. Yet he claims he has gotten over it. When he invites her over to his new home he has recreated it to look like their old home.

Jenny confides in her friend, Adele when she comes to visit for dinner. She says she wants to end her affair with Howard. Adele encourages this and as a psychologist, offers her services free of charge to Jenny.

When Jenny goes to work, her client's son and daughter-in-law are there to talk about the client. They want to commit her to a mental institution but given her regrets about doing the same to Howard she refuses. She has a breakdown in the office because of this,

Jenny goes to see Adele in her office. The two work through the problem. She talks about why she originally fell in love with Howard. When Adele asks about what Howard was diagnosed with Jenny lists off schizophrenia, paranoia, and psychosis. But she describes how his mood would turn dark when they were together. Jenny also recounts the incident where Howard hospitalised her and which led her and her father to commit Howard to a mental institution. Adele tells her that the sleeping pills that Jenny's doctor gave her may cause waking dreams as a side effect. Ultimately, Jenny writes a letter to Howard, ending the relationship.

Geoff confronts Jenny about her strange behaviour. Jenny confesses about the dreams but doesn't tell him about Howard. She says she needs a break from the city so they retreat to Jenny's parents' vacation home in the country. Throughout the trip Jenny sees Howard and is unsure whether he is really there or a waking dream. Jenny revisits the tree from her nightmares. That night, Jenny's parents recall their grievances with Howard.

Jenny has nightmares again and when she wakes she thinks she sees Howard at the window but it's just a possum. Jenny's father and Geoff talk about a man who hung himself when Jenny was 7, he says that this was the source of her nightmares as a child.

The next day, Jenny looks for evidence that Howard was at the window but then Adele calls. She has looked into Howard's medical history and apparently, Howard was not released from the mental institution but escaped instead. This terrifies Jenny.

Jenny looks for Howard at the small, abandoned house that she saw him in the day before. She finds him trying to climb up into the roof. Jenny begs him to leave her alone. Geoff approaches and Jenny tells Howard to hide. Geoff asks who she was talking to and she lies again saying she was just talking to herself.

Geoff's friend and co-worker Barbara arrives which angers Jenny. She goes to the abandoned house again but doesn't find Howard however there is a dead dove. When Barbara discusses the case she's brought Geoff to look at, Jenny is angered that they are defending developers who she dislikes due to their treatment of her clients. Later, she gets upset that no one is talking to her and her father tries to comfort her but she runs away to the house again.

Suddenly, she sees Howard hanging from a tree like from when she was a child. She screams and calls Geoff and her father to take a look. But when they come, no one is there. Jenny's mother gives her a pill to help her sleep. They think Jenny has gone insane and consider committing her to a mental hospital.

In the middle of the night, Howard comes to Jenny's house and breaks open the window. He tells her that her family are planning to commit her and asks her to run away with him. Jenny's mind is clouded by the medication and she follows Howard deep into the woods.

Jenny realises that if what she saw was real, Howard should be dead. She accuses him of gaslighting her. Jenny's father has discovered that Jenny is missing and comes to the woods with a gun. He shoots Howard but misses. Howard beats Jenny's father with a machete. Jenny finds her father's dropped gun and shoots Howard again killing him this time.

In the final scene, Jenny's perfect life is restored.

== Cast ==
- Wendy Hughes as Jenny: A woman with a perfect life until her ex-husband reappears.
- Jenny Ellis as Kate: Jenny and Geoff's daughter.
- Jack Ellis as Michael: Jenny and Geoff's son.
- Robert Grubb as Geoff: A gentle man and Jenny's husband.
- Kris McQuade as Sue: Jenny's friend and co-worker at the welfare centre.
- Kati Edwards as Mrs. Carter: A welfare recipient that Jenny serves. She claims that her daughter-in-law is poisoning her through various methods.
- Liz Chance as Mrs.Beck: A welfare recipient with children and an apparently abusive husband.
- Richard Moir as Howard: A mysterious and dangerous man who was Jenny's ex-husband and comes back into Jenny's life.
- Charlotte Haywood as Young Jenny: During Jenny's memory while she was young.
- Peter Gwynne as Jenny's Father: A brave and gentle father and always took care with his daughter and saved her from danger.
- Carol Raye as Jenny's Mother: A peaceful mother in the film and talked patiently to Jenny with all the awful things she met.
- John Doyle as Simon: Runs the art gallery visited in the film.
- Sandy Gore as Adele: Jenny's good friend.
- Bob Ellis as Gerry: A relevant man with Jenny.
- David Slingsby as Mrs. Carter's Son
- Helen McDonald as Mrs. Carter's Daughter-in-law
- Celia De Burgh as Barbara: Geoff's friend and coworker.

== Production ==
- Anne Brooksbank
- Lex Marinos
- Australian Film Commission later Screen Australian.
- McElroy & McElroy
- Taft Hardie Group
