= Mad Bomber in Love =

- Directed by: James Bogle
- Written by: James Bogle; Martin Brown
- Produced by: George Mannix
- Starring: Craig Pearce; Rachel Szalay; Laura Keneally; Craig McLachlan; Marcus Graham; Zoe Carides; Paul Chubb; Max Cullen
- Cinematography: John Brock
- Edited by: Laura Zusters
- Release date: 1992
- Running time: 85 minutes
- Country: Australia
- Language: English
- Box office: A$14,590 (Australia)

Mad Bomber in Love is a 1992 Australian film. It was a slasher parody.

== Plot ==
Julia (Rachel Szalay) and her housemates acquire a charming new tenant in Bernard (Craig Pearce), but it is not long before they discover that he is a psychotic urban terrorist.

== Cast ==
- Craig Pearce as Bernard Lynch
- Rachel Szalay as Julia
- Laura Keneally as Mary Lou
- Zachery McKay as Bill
- Alex Morcos as Gunther
- Alan Lovell as Frank Jensen
- Anthony Ackroyd as Alistair
- Craig McLachlan as The Whip
- Marcus Graham as Franklin
- Zoe Carides as Rebecca
- Paul Chubb as Sven
- Max Cullen as Sergeant Meggs
- Helen Jones as Strange Woman
- James Bogle as City Worker
- Andrew Denton as Self
- Di Smith as Caller

== Production ==
The film was scripted in two weeks and shot in two weeks, with no budget.

Director James Bogle said of the film:

That was more like an event than a film, just to make the statement that, if you really wanted to, you could actually make a film for nothing. It took about a year to complete, as it turned out, even though we only shot it for 14 days.
