= Russell Street Theatre =

Theatre in Melbourne, Australia

The Russell Street Theatre was a theatre on Russell Street, Melbourne, Australia. Melbourne Theatre Company performed there from 1960 to 1994, using it as their main city venue in the 1960s and early 1970s and their secondary venue from the late 1970s to 1994.

The theatre was first constructed as an engineering workshop in the 1880s and was extended as a church in 1920. In 1955, the building was sold to the Council of Adult Education and converted into a theatre seating 420. The then Union Theatre Repertory Company (later the MTC) used the building for half the year as their city venue from 1960, and took over the building five years later. Architect Robin Boyd renovated the theatre and decorated it in shades of red. The theatre closed in 1994 when the MTC moved fully to the then Victorian Arts Centre.
