= Archer (film) =

1985 TV film

- Based on: idea by Mike Norris; Bob Ellis
- Written by: Anne Brooksbank
- Directed by: Denny Lawrence
- Starring: Brett Climo; Robert Coleby; Nicole Kidman
- Music by: Chris Neal
- Country of origin: Australia
- Original language: English

Production
- Producer: Moya Iceton
- Cinematography: Frank Hammond
- Editor: Ted Ötton
- Running time: 128 mins
- Production companies: Roadshow Coote & Carroll; Australian Film Commission

Original release
- Release: 3 November 1985

Archer, renamed Archer's Adventure, is a 1985 Australian made-for-television western drama film relating an adventurous fictional story of a journey overland taken by Archer, the first horse to win the Melbourne Cup and a 17-year-old strapper, Dave Power. Directed by Denny Lawrence, it was filmed in New South Wales' Sydney outskirts, Baulkham Hills, Megalong Valley and Snowy Mountains and Victoria's Melbourne.

== Cast ==
- Brett Climo as Dave Power
- Robert Coleby as Etienne de Mestre
- Nicole Kidman as Catherine
- Tony Barry as Squatter
- Paul Bertram as Lord Alfred
- Anna-Maria Monticelli as Anna Swift
- Ned Lander as Jack Curtis
- Doreen Warburton as Cook
- Claire Corbett as Maid
- Brian Anderson as Mailman
- John Spicer as Butler
- Robin Bowering as Mr Power
- Helen McDonald as Mrs Power
- Karyn Greig as Mrs de Mestre
- Bradey Meehan as Boy
- Shari Flood as Girl
- Lyn Collingwood as Shoekeeper

== See also ==
- List of films about horses
- List of films about horse racing
