= Duke of Edinburgh Assassinated or The Vindication of Henry Parkes =

1971 play by Bob Ellis and Dick Hall

- Original language: English
- Written by: Bob Ellis; Dick Hall
- Music by: Terence Clarke
- Characters: Henry Parkes; Henry O'Farrell
- Subject: Australian history
- Genre: historical drama

Premiere
- Date: August 25, 1971
- Place: Nimrod Theatre, Sydney
- Directed by: Arne Neame

Duke of Edinburgh Assassinated or The Vindication of Henry Parkes is a 1971 Australian play written by Bob Ellis and Dick Hall about the attempted assassination of Prince Alfred in Sydney in 1868. It followed Ellis' successful The Legend of King O'Malley.

== Premise ==
At Clontarf Beach, Sydney, in 1868, Henry O'Farrell attempts to assassinate Prince Alfred. Henry Parkes uses the incident to further his own political ends.

== Background ==
In 1970 Bob Ellis went to a party given by Gough Whitlam's secretary Dick Hall thinking he was going to be asked to write speeches for Whitlam. Instead Hall proposed they collaborate on a musical about the attempted assassination of Prince Alfred in Sydney in 1868. (This had been the subject of an earlier play The New Crime.) Hall was an expert on the period, having written a chapter on O'Farrell for a never-published book on Australian murder trials. "I knew I'd never get a Cabinet rank if I said no," joked Ellis.

They wrote the play over weekends. "One of us would walk and the other one would type," said Hall. "I won't say there haven't been any tensions."

The authors based their script on Parkes' poetry and an interview between Parkes and Henry O'Farrell while the latter was waiting to be executed. Ellis felt the events of the assassination, which resulted in the "botch up of our very first Royal tour", was the beginning of "the great Australian inferiority complex", and had resonances for the political situation in Northern Ireland when the play was written.

The play was originally known as The O'Farrell Affair.

== Productions ==
It premiered at the Nimrod Theatre in 1971 directed by Aarne Neame. A cast of six played a variety of parts.

The play was also produced in Melbourne in 1972.

== Reception ==
Reviewing the 1971 production the Sydney Morning Herald theatre critic Henry Kippax felt the criticism of Parkes "sometimes came across as a smear" but believed the second half was better than the first. "With the plot out of the way the authors are free in the second half to explore its implications and develop some of their themese," wrote Kippax. "The piece takes wing amusingly."

Brian Hoad, the theatre reviewer for The Bulletin said:

Slabs of factual research and transcription covering trials, commissions andinterviews (fascinating in content, no doubt, but deadly dull as theatre) are interspersed with stretches of music-hall song-and dance routines in a desperately contrived effort to sugar the pill. But the pill sticks firmly in the throat. The authors are concerned with politics, not Parkes. They have produced a play without characters, a documentary dolled up as a theatrical event and a somewhat confusing documentary at that.

== Original 1971 cast ==
- John Wood as Henry Parkes
- Victor Marsh as Henry O'Farrell
- Bob Hornery
- Max Phipps
- Carole Skinner
- Alan Tobin
