= Henry O'Farrell =

Irish-Australian criminal

Henry James O'Farrell
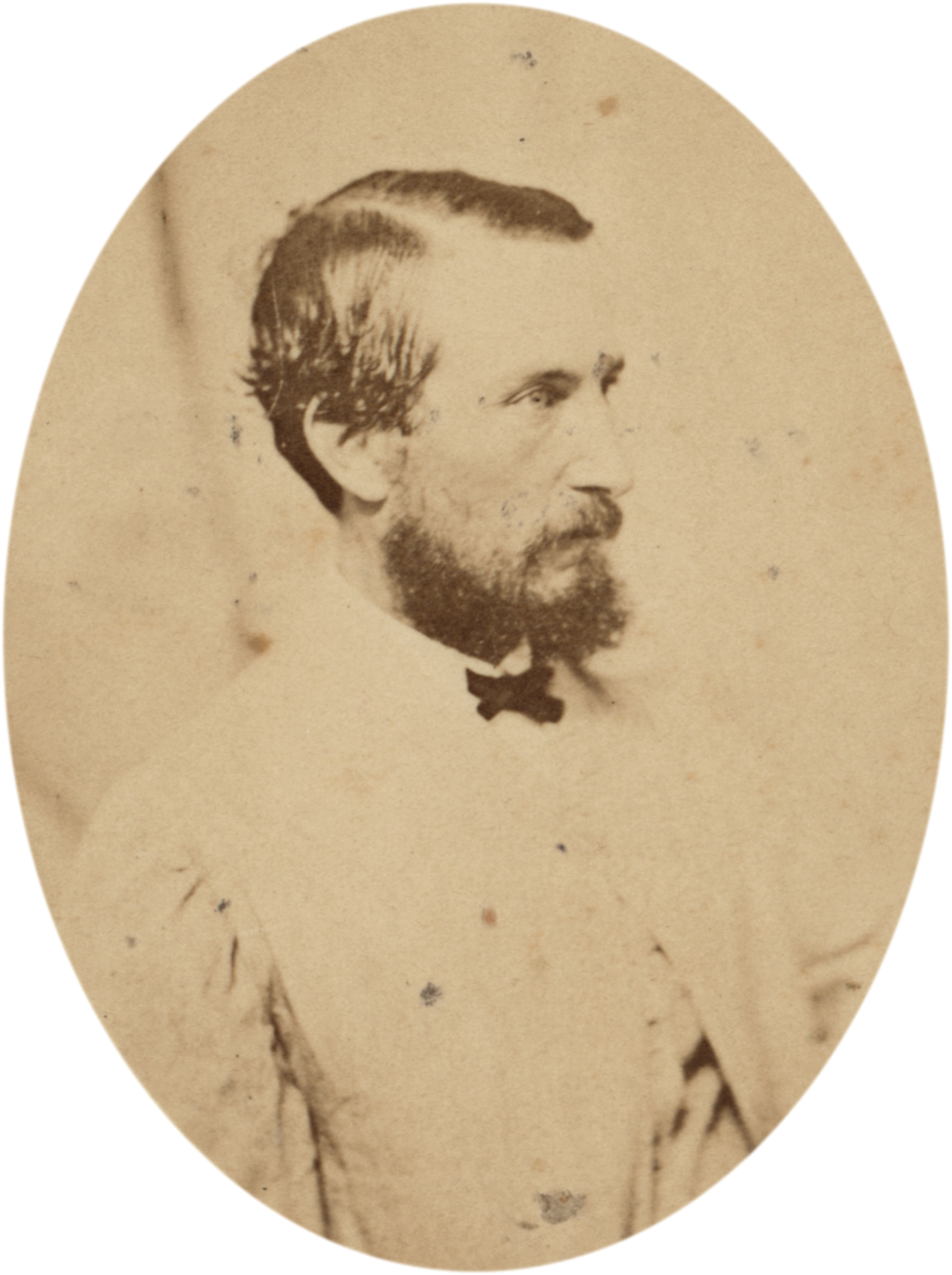
- Henry James O'Farrell, Sydney, about 1868, by Eugene Montagu Scott
- Born: c. 1833; Arran Quay, Dublin, Ireland
- Died: 21 April 1868; Darlinghurst Gaol, Sydney, Australia
- Occupation: Produce merchant
- Status: Executed
- Conviction: Attempted murder of Prince Alfred
- Penalty: Death

Henry James O'Farrell (c. 1833 – 21 April 1868) was the first person to attempt a political assassination in Australia. On 12 March 1868, he shot and wounded Prince Alfred, Duke of Edinburgh, the second son and fourth child of Queen Victoria.

Henry O'Farrell was from an Irish-Australian family who had migrated to Melbourne in the early 1840s. He was heavily influenced by Catholicism and Irish nationalism. By the early 1860s, O'Farrell was showing signs of mental instability, exacerbated by heavy drinking. O'Farrell travelled to Sydney during the tour of Australian colonies by Prince Alfred, where he made an attempt to kill the royal visitor at a public picnic at the harbour-side suburb of Clontarf. Despite a plea of insanity O'Farrell was convicted of wounding Prince Alfred with intent to murder and was executed in April 1868 at Darlinghurst Gaol.

O'Farrell's attempted assassination of Prince Alfred produced a wave of public sympathy and outrage in Australia. The veteran New South Wales politician, Henry Parkes, took advantage of sectarian discord to push through repressive legislation and raise concerns of a secret cohort of Fenian conspirators in Australia. Parkes' failure to prove such a conspiracy signalled a temporary decline in his political influence.

== Biography ==
=== Early life ===
Henry James O'Farrell was born in about 1833 at Arran Quay, on the north bank of the River Liffey in Dublin, Ireland, one of eleven children of William O'Farrell and Maria Anastasia (née Flinn, Flynn, O'Flynn). His father was a butcher. In 1836 William and Maria O'Farrell migrated with their family across the Irish Sea to Liverpool, where William re-established his butchery at Edge Hill, near the city's docks. In 1841 the O'Farrell family migrated to Australia, arriving in the newly-established settlement of Melbourne in the Port Phillip District. William set up a butcher's shop at the lower end of Elizabeth-street. Maria O'Farrell died in March 1842 in Melbourne (when Henry was nine years-old).

By 1846, William O'Farrell had been appointed as a rate-collector in the Melbourne Town Council, and in December 1848, he was appointed as a Town Auctioneer. O'Farrell's children "were educated in a manner to fit them for positions higher than the trade followed by their father". Young Henry O'Farrell received his early education at David Boyd's 'Melbourne Academy' school in Queen-street and then as a boarder at the Melbourne Analytical Seminary for General Education run by James McLaughlin, "to learn the classics, theology and elocution". In 1848 and 1849, he attended the school-house at the rear of St. Francis' Chapel on the corner of Elizabeth and Lonsdale Streets.

William O'Farrell was an inaugural member of the St. Patrick's Society of Australia Felix, formed in Melbourne in 1842. Sectarian tensions came to the surface in Melbourne after the formation of the Orange Society in 1843. On 19 March 1846, Henry O'Farrell, as one of the St. Patrick's Society's "juvenile members", made his maiden speech at the Society's anniversary dinner.

After the appointment of James Goold as the first Catholic Bishop of Melbourne in 1848, the O'Farrell family developed close ties to the Catholic hierarchy in Melbourne. Bishop Goold conferred "minor orders prior to ordination" on Henry O'Farrell in December 1850 at St. Francis' Church, in a ceremony considered to be "on the path to priesthood". In early 1851, O'Farrell was ordained as a sub-deacon and in 1852 as a deacon. Henry's older brother Peter was admitted as a solicitor in September 1851 and began handling "the growing legal issues" of Bishop Goold and senior clergy and managing Church land acquisitions.

As a young man, O'Farrell "was regarded as genial, warm-hearted, and enthusiastic", but possessed an abiding passion for Irish nationalism.

=== Travel and business enterprises ===
In about 1853, Henry O'Farrell left Melbourne for Europe, to continue his studies. One account claimed he accompanied a French priest who was proceeding to France for the purpose of printing a Bible in the Maori language, translated at a Catholic missionary establishment in New Zealand. O'Farrell visited the principal cities on the Continent, including Paris and Rome, and also travelled in England and Ireland. He was absent for about two years, returning to Victoria in about 1854. O'Farrell's father died in July 1854 at South Melbourne (an event that may have prompted his return from Europe).

In about 1855, Henry O'Farrell gave up his intention of joining the priesthood after he "had a dispute with the bishop on some religious points". Soon afterwards, O'Farrell went to Clunes "to learn sheep farming". Soon afterwards, in partnership with his cousin Joseph Kennedy, O'Farrell established "a flourishing and lucrative business" as a grain merchant at Ballarat, operating a hay and corn store at the corner of Doveton-street and Market-square.

=== Increasing instability ===
O'Farrell was described "as a man of gentlemanly demeanour, but exceedingly excitable, and of a very violent and misanthropical disposition". It was said of him that he was one who "having attached himself to an idea would pursue it at any cost, to himself or to others".

By March 1863, creditor attention began to be paid to the financial affairs of O'Farrell's elder brother, the Melbourne solicitor Peter A. C. O'Farrell, who had in previous months been involved in an acrimonious dispute that culminated with him being put on trial for libel, for which he was found guilty, resulting in serious damage to his public reputation. Subsequent investigations into his finances disclosed a deficiency in his estate of approximately twenty thousand pounds.^{[A]}

In July 1863, Peter O'Farrell's estate was compulsorily sequestrated as a result of a petition by his brother Henry O'Farrell and James Kennedy. In late August, the court issued a rule nisi calling on Peter O'Farrell to show cause as to why his estate should not be finally sequestered. By late September 1863, while insolvency proceedings were still underway in the Supreme Court, rumours began to spread regarding Peter O'Farrell's disappearance and probable departure from the colony. By February 1864, it was confirmed that he had left Victoria "without complying with the conditions of administration". According to his younger sister, Henry O'Farrell "sustained some pecuniary losses by the departure of his brother; he seemed to feel it very much".^{[B]}

Henry O'Farrell's produce business operated until about March 1867, but with its owner's health and mental state in marked decline during the last few years of its operation (probably exacerbated by the excessive drinking of alcohol). O'Farrell was known to drink "very hard, and was subject to fits of delirium tremens". It was reported that, "on one occasion he asked an acquaintance to lend him a pair of pistols to blow his brains out". In January 1867, two of Henry's sisters were summoned to Ballarat by O'Farrell's medical attendants. His older sister, Caroline Allan, later described how her brother did not recognise them at first. He was subject to various delusions, including asserting that "he had been poisoned by the doctors".

=== The royal tour ===
At the beginning of 1867, Prince Alfred, the Duke of Edinburgh and Queen Victoria's second son, had embarked on a world cruise aboard the Galatea, a steam-powered sail-equipped frigate. With the Prince as captain, the Galatea departed from Gibraltar in June 1867 and visited Rio de Janeiro in Brazil, the tiny island of Tristan da Cunha in the South Atlantic and the Cape Colony of southern Africa, before arriving at Adelaide in October 1867 to begin what was to be Australia's first royal tour. The Prince visited the colonies of South Australia, New South Wales, Victoria, Tasmania and Queensland, in an itinerary consisting of numerous official engagements, civic receptions, dances, and public events. Details of the royal tour and the enthusiastic responses of the public were comprehensively recorded in colonial newspapers.

During a welcoming ceremony at Melbourne on 24 November 1867, an estimated crowd of ten thousand gathered to meet Prince Alfred. An image of William of Orange defeating the Catholic armies at the Battle of the Boyne was erected on a hall in Melbourne. An Irish Catholic crowd gathered outside, with stones being thrown at the hall, and someone fired shots from inside the hall into the crowd. A Catholic boy was killed, and a riot between Irish Catholics and Protestants broke out.

=== Assassination attempt ===
The Galatea arrived at Sydney from Tasmania on 21 January 1868 and berthed at Circular Quay. The Prince was welcomed by the Colonial Secretary, Henry Parkes, and the Governor, Lord Belmore, in an elaborate pavilion erected for the occasion. Later the Prince and his entourage were driven to Government House through the welcoming crowds. O'Farrell was in the crowd that day. He later stated: "I had gone to Circular Quay on the day of the Prince's arrival in Sydney, and I intended to shoot him there, but the opportunity did not present itself".

In March 1868, a public picnic was organised to raise public funds for the partially-completed Sailors' Home in Sydney. The organising committee extended an invitation to Prince Alfred to attend the event, which was accepted "and this event was looked forward to as one of the chief festivities in connexion with His Royal Highness's sojourn in the colony". The Sailors' Home Picnic was held on Thursday, 12 March, at "the picturesque spot" of Clontarf, on the north shore of Sydney's middle harbour. Five steamers were engaged to convey the public from Circular Quay to the picnic ground during the day. A large marquee had been added to the permanent buildings at the site to function as a "luncheon saloon" and a "handsome tent" was pitched opposite the beach, "for the convenience of His Royal Highness and suite". A number of yachts and steamers, decorated with flags and bunting, anchored nearby. By midday, it was estimated between two and three thousand persons were present.

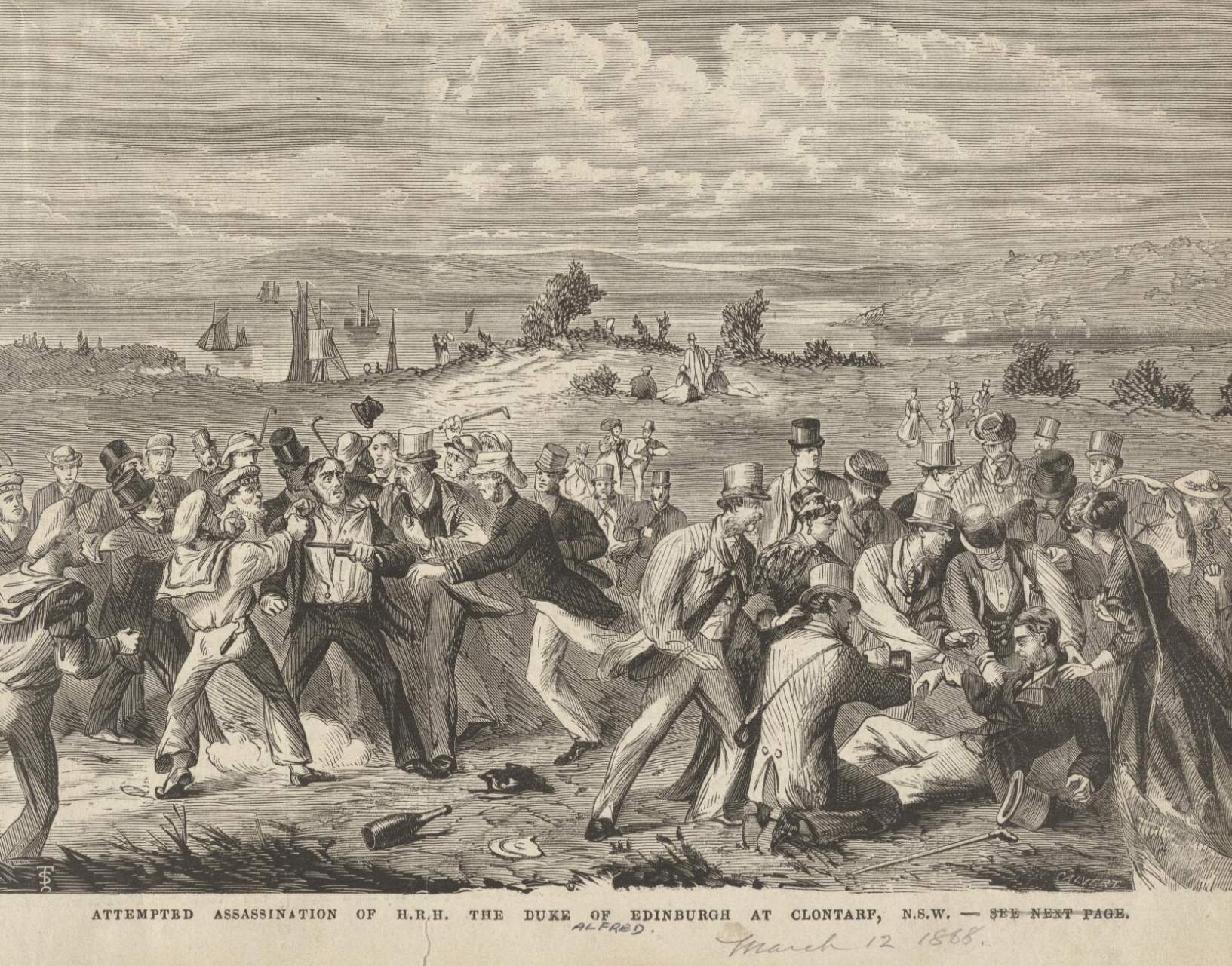
'Attempted assassination of H.R.H. the Duke of Edinburgh at Clontarf, N.S.W.' (wood engraving by Samuel Calvert)

Alfred and his entourage left the Galatea and sailed to the picnic ground aboard the steam-yacht Fairy, arriving at the Clontarf jetty at about two o'clock. They were met by members of the committee and escorted to the marquee where luncheon was provided. After the meal and a toast to "the health of Her Majesty the Queen", at about 3.20 p.m. Prince Alfred and his retinue proceeded to the tent "that had been set apart for their private use".

When they reached the Royal tent Alfred conversed with several of the dignitaries, before he and Sir William Manning walked across to a clump of trees bordering the beach where a band was playing. The Prince handed Manning a cheque as a donation for the Sailors' Home. At that stage Henry O'Farrell, who had been standing amongst a group under the shade of the trees, walked up behind Alfred "and when he had approached to within five or six feet pulled out a revolver, took deliberate aim, and fired". The shot struck the middle of the Prince's back, about two inches to the right of his spine. He fell forward to his hands and knees, saying "My back is broken". Manning turned and sprang at O'Farrell, but lost his balance and fell. The would-be assassin took aim at Manning, but at that moment was grabbed by a bystander, a coach-maker named William Vial, who pinioned O'Farrell's arms to his side. In doing so the firearm discharged, the shot hitting the foot of George Thorne, who then fainted. Other bystanders also seized O'Farrell and there were cries of "lynch him" and "hang him" from the enraged crowd. The police, headed by Superintendent Orridge, took charge of the prisoner "and they had the greatest difficulty in preventing the infuriated people from tearing him limb from limb". With difficulty O'Farrell was taken to the wharf and placed on board the Paterson steamer, by which time the clothing from his upper body had been torn off, his face and body were "much bruised" and blood "was flowing from various wounds".^{[C]}

After he was shot, three or four men carried Prince Alfred to his tent where several doctors took charge of his care. When they examined the wound they found the bullet had penetrated to the right of the lower part of the spine, "traversing the course of the ribs" to the right of the abdomen where it lodged just below the surface. The assassination attempt galvanised the crowd; "suddenly a joyous throng had been converted into a mass of excited people". Hundreds crowded around the tent awaiting the result of the medical examination. The Prince had never lost consciousness, and "finding the people so anxious about him", said: "Tell the people I am not much hurt, I shall be better presently". At about five o'clock Albert was placed on a litter and carried onto the deck of the Morpeth steamer and conveyed to Sydney.

After O'Farrell was apprehended police went to Tiernan's Currency Lass Hotel in central Sydney where they found the prisoner's few personal possessions in the room where he had spent the previous night. Investigations revealed O'Farrell had stayed at the Clarendon Hotel in George-Street for most of the preceding week.

=== Trial and execution ===
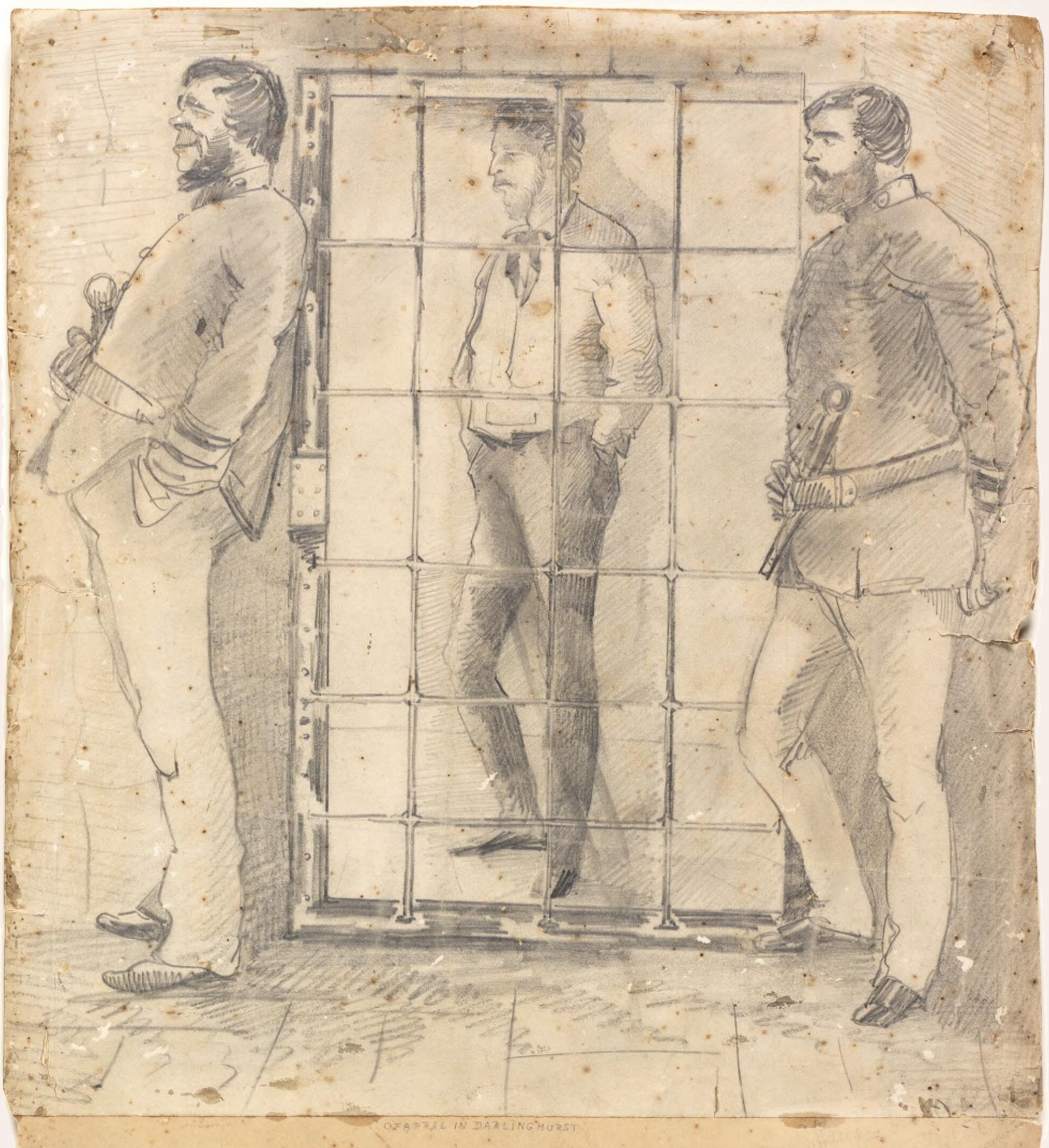
Henry O'Farrell in Darlinghurst Gaol (pencil drawing by Francis Newry)

A preliminary examination into the charge against O'Farrell was held over four days in the Debtors' Prison section of Darlinghurst Gaol before the magistrate Houlton H. Voss, commencing on 13 March, the day after the assassination attempt, and continuing until 16 March. Several of the police officers at the scene gave evidence that O'Farrell had claimed to be a Fenian as he was being subdued after the assassination attempt.

Two days later, on 18 March 1868, the Colonial Secretary, Henry Parkes, and the Speaker of the Legislative Assembly, William M. Arnold, visited O'Farrell in gaol during which, as reported in The Sydney Morning Herald, the prisoner was "very communicative" and supplied details of his involvement with the Fenian brotherhood, the Irish republican organisation formed in the United States and responsible for violent actions in Canada. According to the report, O'Farrell claimed to have received written orders from the Fenian leadership directing the execution of Prince Alfred, stating "that the general design of the Fenian organisation was to strike terror into the English people (or aristocracy), believing that to be the most effectual mode of bringing about the independence of Ireland".

O'Farrell was arraigned on 26 March, on an indictment charging him with wounding, with intent to murder, Alfred, the Duke of Edinburgh, at Clontarf on 12 March 1868. He pleaded not guilty to the charge and was brought up for trial in the Central Criminal Court on Monday, 30 March 1868, before Justice Alfred Cheeke. O'Farrell's defence team was headed by a barrister from Melbourne, Butler Aspinall. In summing up the case for the defence, Aspinall appealed to the jury to find his client not guilty on the ground of insanity, describing O'Farrell as "a man whose intellect was in such a state that he could not be held to be responsible for his actions". He concluded his address: "Amidst the terror, the anguish, the profound and all-pervading excitement of the time the unhappy prisoner... now stands before you to receive at your hands a verdict, which will have the effect of either consigning him to an ignominious death, or to a doom still more appalling – the dread solitude of a lunatic asylum". The jury retired for an hour before they returned into court with a verdict of guilty. Justice Cheeke then "passed sentence of death upon the prisoner".

On 5 April 1868, Prince Alfred wrote to Lord Belmore, the governor of New South Wales, requesting that O'Farrell's life be spared for the stated reason that "by the laws of England the attempt to murder was not punishable with death, and he did not wish that the culprit should be treated with greater severity here than he would have received if his crime had been committed in England". Despite Prince Alfred's request that his letter "be made known to the public", his attempted intercession to spare O'Farrell's life only became public knowledge in February 1869.^{[D]}

The Executive Council did not meet to consider Judge Cheeke's report of O'Farrell's trial until the evening of Prince Alfred's departure from Sydney on 6 April. O'Farrell's legal team had made "strenuous efforts" to have the case reviewed by the Executive Council and the sister of the convicted man forwarded a memorial to Lord Belmore "urging the belief of her brother's insanity, repudiating the idea that his act was influenced by any connection with Fenianism, and imploring his Excellency to exercise the prerogative of mercy in his favour". Despite these efforts the meeting of the Executive Council confirmed the court's decision.

Henry James O'Farrell was executed by the public hangman on 21 April 1868, at nine o'clock in the morning, within the precincts of Darlinghurst Gaol. He met death "with the most imperturbable nerve and firmness".

O'Farrell chose to write out a declaration, to be read after his death, in preference to making an address from the scaffold. On the afternoon after his execution, William Macleay, the member for Murrumbidgee, requested in the Legislative Assembly that the contents of the document be revealed, to which Parkes replied that O'Farrell's letter would need to be considered by the Cabinet before the contents were made public. The next day Macleay repeated his request. After receiving a similar reply to the day before, Macleay "read to the House a document in O'Farrell's handwriting, which he vouched was a copy of the confession in possession of the Government". In the document O'Farrell retracted his claims of being "one of many who were prepared to do the deed", stating that he "had not the slightest foundation for such a statement". He denied being "connected with that organisation in Ireland and elsewhere which is known by the name of the Fenian organisation" and had "no foundation for stating that there was a Fenian organisation in New South Wales". The government later instituted an inquiry "to find out by what means the second letter was conveyed out of the gaol, but no direct evidence could be obtained".

== Aftermath of the assassination attempt ==
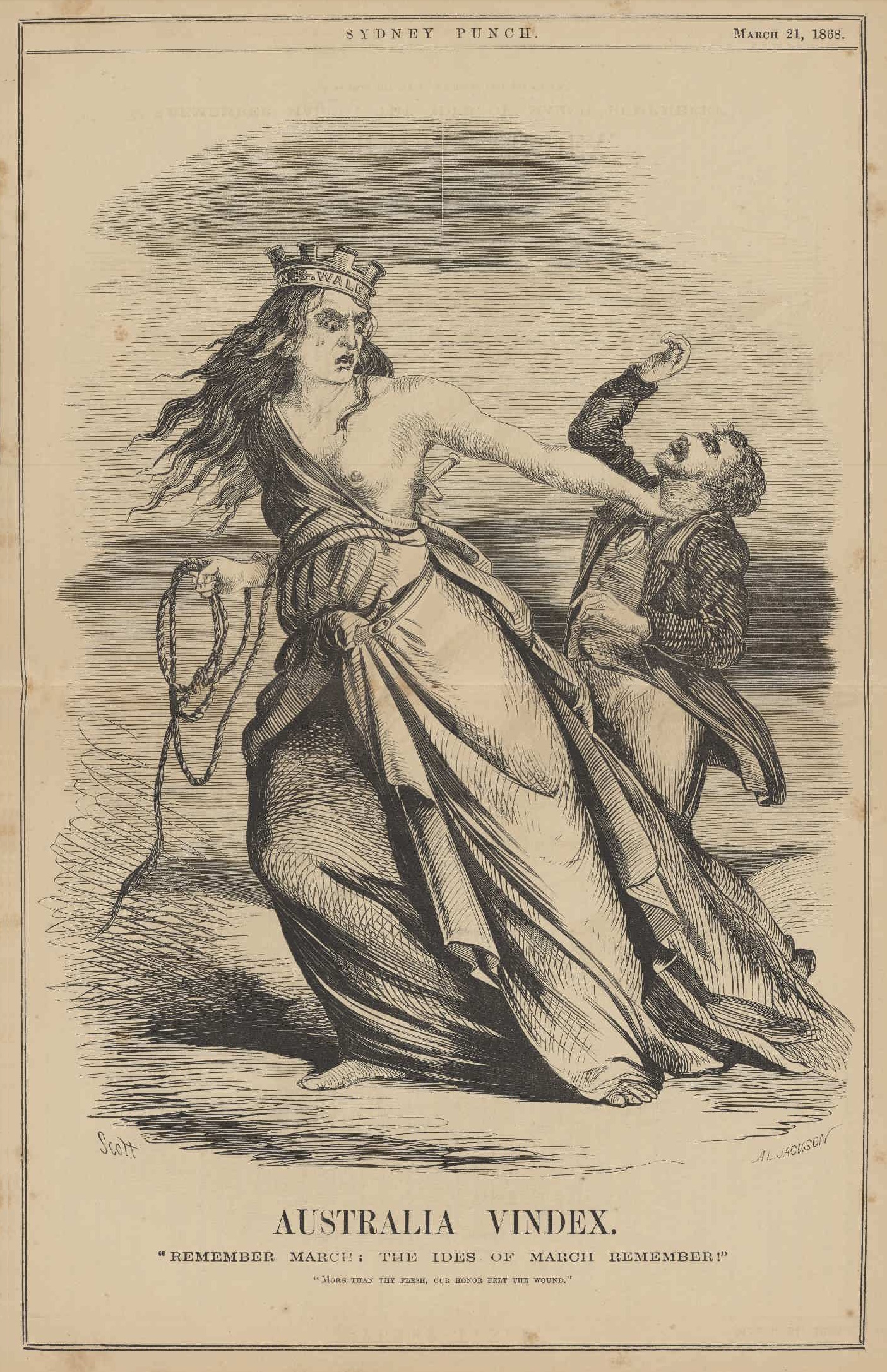
'Australia Vindex' by A. L. Jackson, a cartoon expressing public outrage towards O'Farrell (published in Sydney Punch, 21 March 1868).

The assassination attempt produced a wave of public sympathy and outrage in Australia, exemplified by an editorial statement in the Sydney Morning Herald published the following day:

One universal feeling of sorrow, shame, and rage pervades the community. The whole colony has been wounded in the person of its Royal guest. A crime, which every one will repudiate with horror, has shadowed our reputation.

An "indignation meeting" was held at the Pavilion at Hyde Park on 13 March, the day after "the late outrage" at Clontarf, addressed by city officials and politicians and attended by an estimated seventeen to twenty thousand persons. Similar meetings throughout the colony were held on the same day and in the following days.

The attempted assassination of Prince Alfred prompted widespread spontaneous and passionate responses in the Australian colonies. In a frenzy of Imperial loyalty hundreds of "indignation meetings" were held around the country in the weeks following the event, organised by local and political elites and leading to a wave of anti-Catholic and anti-Irish sentiment. It has been estimated that at least 250 indignation meetings were held, sixty percent of which took place within a week of the shooting. From the late 1850s telegraph technology had progressively linked the colonial capitals to their hinterlands and provided connections between the mainland colonies of eastern Australia. Newspaper accounts via "telegraphic dispatches" provided bulletins from other town and colonies, helping to "substantiate the idea of a national movement".

Membership of Orange lodges, under the Grand Orange Lodge of Australia, grew rapidly in response to the assassination attempt. By 1876 membership of active lodges in New South Wales had reached its historical peak, with over nineteen thousand Orangemen belonging to 120 lodges throughout the colony.

A statement on 16 March from the doctors attending Prince Alfred stated that the patient was able to sit up, although he was occasionally suffering pains from the wound. In late March 1868, two weeks after the assassination attempt, it was reported that Prince Alfred "continues steadily to regain strength, and his progress towards perfect recovery is as rapid as the most sanguine could expect".

Henry Parkes saw political advantage in the wave of popular fervour and sectarian sentiment. He wrote to the Victorian Colonial Secretary, James McCulloch, informing him that his government possessed information that O'Farrell was one of a group of Fenians, some of whom were in Victoria. On 18 March the New South Wales Legislative Assembly initiated the Treason Felony Act, which passed through all its stages in one day and by evening, after receiving Viceregal assent, had become the law of the land. New clauses added by the government included punishment of up to two years imprisonment "for using language disrespectful to the Queen, or expressing sympathy with certain offenders" and the "writing or publishing of similar language and expressions". Although the Act met with little opposition at the time, considerable skepticism emerged about its repressive clauses. As committals began under the provisions of the Act, some politicians attempted to distance themselves from their earlier acquiescence and urged caution in its exercise.

On 20 March a public meeting was convened by the mayor of Sydney with the object of "raising a permanent and substantial monument" in gratitude at the recovery of the Duke of Edinburgh from the attempt on his life. The meeting resolved to erect a hospital with funds raised by public subscription on the site of the main building of the Sydney Infirmary, to be named 'Prince Alfred's Hospital'.^{[E]}

Concerns about Fenianism in Australia were highlighted by late May 1868 when the news of the assassination of the Irish-Canadian politician, T. D'Arcy McGee, reached Australia. McGee had been prominent in his condemnation of the Fenian Brotherhood. He was murdered in early April 1868 at Ottawa and a known Fenian, Patrick Whelan, was charged with the crime. However, as the months passed, efforts by Parkes and his supporters, including investigations by police authorities and detectives, failed to find any evidence of a Fenian organisation or conspirators in Australia. The actions of Henry Parkes during O'Farrell's incarceration and trial began to be seen as the manipulation of public hysteria and sectarian discord for political advantage, driven by his "excessive zeal, which altogether outran discretion".

In August 1868 Parkes delivered a speech to his constituents at Kiama, in which he asserted that the government possessed proof of a Fenian conspiracy. In September 1868 Parkes resigned from the office of Colonial Secretary in the ministry led by James Martin.

On 15 December 1868 a select committee, the 'Alleged Conspiracy for purposes of Treason and Assassination Committee', was appointed to investigate the alleged conspiracy related to the attempted assassination of Prince Alfred. The committee was chaired by William Macleay and concluded its work by 3 February 1869. The final report concluded that there was no Fenian conspiracy involved in the attempted assassination by O'Farrell of the Duke of Edinburgh. However, the report was rejected by the Legislative Assembly. Henry Parkes succeeded in garnering "a considerable majority of votes" which concluded that the committee's report "contained numerous statements and inferences not warranted by the evidence, and was made an instrument of personal hostility against a member of the House, in disregard of the authorised objects of the inquiry, and manifestly for party purposes". The report was then expunged from the parliamentary records.

In 1882, O'Farrell's brother Peter O'Farrell attempted to assassinate James Alipius Goold, the Catholic Archbishop of Melbourne.

== In popular culture ==
The event was dramatised in the 1971 play Duke of Edinburgh Assassinated or The Vindication of Henry Parkes, written by Bob Ellis and Dick Hall.

== Notes ==
A.O'Farrell's elder brother, Peter Andrew Charles O'Farrell (1832–1898), was a well-known solicitor in Melbourne by the late 1850s. Peter O'Farrell held nearly the whole of the Roman Catholic business in Melbourne and was the legal adviser to Bishop Goold for many years. He was one of the largest land-owners in the colony, possessing "a multitude of valuable blocks". In February 1863 O'Farrell was prosecuted for libel against Michael Hanify, the chief clerk of the Melbourne police court. The matter arose out of contention respecting the financial affairs of St.Patrick's College and an acrimonious discussion between the creditors of the college and Bishop Goold and his legal advisor, Peter O'Farrell. In 1862 it had become public knowledge that St. Patrick's College, East Melbourne, was unable to pay its debts. An anonymous letter from "A Catholic" was published in The Age newspaper, making critical remarks about Peter O'Farrell and his influence upon Bishop Goold. O'Farrell decided that the writer was Hanify and sent him "an epistle of a most disgraceful character" calling him a liar and a coward and making a variety of allegations against him, including financial misconduct. Hanify also received a "pseudonymous letter", signed "James Gibbins,waiter" questioning the paternity of one of Hanify's children. Hanify then "appealed to the law for protection" and O'Farrell was committed for trial. The case was heard before Sir Redmond Barry and O'Farrell was found guilty on all counts (except of being the author of the Gibbins letter). He was ordered to pay a fine of fifty pounds.

B.Peter O'Farrell initially left Victoria for Calcutta, after which he travelled to London and then New York. In America he made a living as a writer for newspapers and periodicals. In about 1879 O'Farrell relocated to San Francisco. He returned to Australia in 1882. Soon after O'Farrell's return from America he "entered into a dispute with... Archbishop Goold, whom he accused of having misappropriated funds left by his father". On the evening of 21 August 1882 Archbishop Goold, in company with Father Daly, was strolling near Goold's residence at Brighton, when Peter O'Farrell came up to them and, pointing a revolver at the Archbishop, fired two shots in quick succession, one of which hit Goold's finger. O'Farrell ran away and was found about two hours later, hiding in tea-tree scrub, and arrested. O'Farrell was tried on 20 September in the Central Criminal Court, charged with having shot at Archbishop Goold "with intent to kill him". The prisoner pleaded not guilty. O'Farrell claimed he "had not been actuated by any felonious intent", otherwise he could not have missed the Archbishop from a distance of only six feet. The jury, after retiring for about an hour, found the prisoner guilty "of unlawfully and maliciously wounding". O'Farrell was gaoled for two years, and after his release he was again prosecuted for threatening the Archbishop. He was sent to gaol again for a period of nine months, being unable to find anyone to provide sureties for his good behaviour. Archbishop Goold died in June 1886. Towards the end of his life O'Farrell was "in very poor circumstances"; a week before his death he was picked up in the streets with "practically nothing in his possession". Peter Andrew Charles O'Farrell died on 18 October 1898 in Melbourne Hospital of Bright's disease.

C.William Vial was presented with a gold watch and chain by the Duke of Edinburgh, in recognition of his services in securing O'Farrell after his assassination attempt at Clontarf.

D.Prince Alfred's letter to Lord Belmore included a request that his intercession "for the life of O'Farrell might be made known to the people". The details of his letter only became public knowledge in February 1869 after William Macleay requested information in parliament about the matter from the New South Wales premier Sir James Martin. Martin claimed that the colonial governor, Lord Belmore, had requested that the Prince's letter, which had been laid before the Executive Council, be kept secret.

E.In 1903 King Edward VII conferred the title 'Royal' upon the hospital, which thereafter was named the "Royal Prince Alfred Hospital".
