= Man of Flowers =

- Directed by: Paul Cox
- Written by: Paul Cox; Bob Ellis
- Produced by: Jane Ballantyne
- Starring: Norman Kaye; Alyson Best; Chris Haywood; Sarah Walker
- Cinematography: Yuri Sokol
- Edited by: Tim Lewis
- Distributed by: International Spectrafilm; Palace Academy Home Video; Roadshow Entertainment
- Release date: 1983
- Running time: 91 minutes
- Country: Australia
- Language: English
- Budget: A$240,000
- Box office: $396,041 (Australia)

Man of Flowers is a 1983 Australian film about an eccentric, reclusive, middle-aged man, Charles Bremer, who enjoys the beauty of art, flowers, music and watching pretty women undress. Werner Herzog has a cameo role as Bremer's father in flashbacks. The film was directed by Paul Cox and was screened in the Un Certain Regard section at the 1984 Cannes Film Festival.

== Plot ==
Charles Bremer (Norman Kaye) is a wealthy, reclusive man. He finds erotic satisfaction in the beauty of art, flowers, and a young woman (Alyson Best), who undresses for him. During the undressings he listens to operatic music such as Donizetti's Lucia di Lammermoor. Throughout the film, he reads letters he has sent to his mother. His mother had long since died, and the letters, it is later revealed, are addressed to himself.

== Cast ==
- Norman Kaye as Charles Bremer
- Alyson Best as Lisa
- Chris Haywood as David
- Sarah Walker as Jane
- Julia Blake as Art Teacher
- Bob Ellis as Psychiatrist
- Barry Dickins as Postman
- Patrick Cook as Coppershop Man
- Victoria Eagger as Angela
- Werner Herzog as The Father
- Hilary Kelly as Mother
- James Stratford as Young Charles
- Eileen Joyce as Aunt
- Marianne Baillieu as Aunt
- Lirit Bilu as Florist
- Juliet Bacskai as Florist
- Dawn Klingberg as Cleaning lady
- Tony Llewellyn-Jones as Church warden

== Production ==
The idea for the film came out of a discussion between Paul Cox and Chris Haywood where they decided to make a low budget erotic film, along with Haywood's then-girlfriend Alyson Best. Paul Cox wrote the first draft. Bob Ellis was brought on to work on the script because of his skill with dialoge. (The two men knew each other because Cox was going to direct Ellis' script The Nostradamus Kid.)

Ellis says he spent nine hours on it because Cox didn't want to spend any more time.) The movie was shot over three weeks.

== Reception ==
The film was an art house hit around the world. It grossed $396,041 at the box office in Australia, which is equivalent to $1,045,548 in 2009 dollars.

== Awards ==
Result	Award	Recipients(s)
Winner	Australian Film Institute - Best Actor in Lead Role	Norman Kaye
Winner	Valladolid International Film Festival - Golden Spike Award	Paul Cox
Nominated	Australian Film Institute - Best Achievement in Cinematography	Yuri Sokol
Nominated	Australian Film Institute - Best Director	Paul Cox
Nominated	Australian Film Institute - Best Film	Jane Ballantyne
Nominated	Australian Film Institute - Best Original Screenplay	Paul Cox, Bob Ellis

== See also ==
- Cinema of Australia

== Notes ==
- Duckett, Victoria (December 2009). "Reworking Romanticism: Paul Cox's Man of Flowers".
