= John Clayton (Australian actor) =

Australian actor (1940–2003)

- Born: John Clayton; 7 April 1940; Sydney, New South Wales, Australia
- Died: 25 September 2003 (aged 63); Sydney, New South Wales, Australia
- Occupations: Actor, producer
- Years active: 1940-2003
- Known for: Home and Away as Danny King; Police Rescue as Inspector Bill Adams

John Clayton (7 April 1940 – 25 September 2003) was an Australian character actor of stage, television and film character actor, he primarily featured in drama series and soap operas.

== Biography ==
Clayton started his long entertainment career in theatre from the time of birth in 1940, before moving into screen role's in the early 1970s, his most prominent roles included that of Inspector Bill Adams on TV drama Police Rescue and Maurie Barnard on Echo Point. He also had recurring roles on Big Sky as Roland 'Riley' Watson, and on Grass Roots as Harry Bond.

He notably featured on Home And Away, where he played the brief role of the brother of Pippa Fletcher - in an ANZAC day story-arc as wheelchair-using former cricketer Danny King in 1988.

Clayton also acted in theatre productions for six decades.

== Filmography ==
=== Film ===
Title	Year	Role	Type
1974	Mother's Day		Feature film
1975	Sidecar Racers	Dave Ferguson	Feature film
1975	Games for Parents and Other Children		TV movie
1976	Me & Mr Thorne	Det Sgt Merv Jackson	TV movie
1977	High Rolling	Arnold	Feature film
1978	The Irishman	Sam Brookes	Feature film
1978	Newsfront	Cliff	Feature film
1979	Dawn!	Syd	Feature film
1980	Palm Beach	Eric Tailor	Feature film
1980	The Girl Who Met Simone De Beauvoir in Paris		Short film
1980	Maybe This Time	Estate Agent	Feature film
1980	Consolation Prize	Bus Stop Cowboy	Short film
1982	Freedom	CES Officer	Feature film
1982	Far East	Tony Alsop	Feature film
1982	Ginger Meggs	Mr Wentworth	Feature film
1982	Goodbye Paradise	Todd	Feature film
1983	Midnite Spares	Vincent	Feature film
1983	With Prejudice	Burke (uncredited)	Feature film
1983	Who Killed Baby Azaria?	Inspector Gilroy	TV movie
1984	Man of Letters	Bill the Chairman	TV movie
1984	Silver City	Employment Officer	Feature film
1985	After Hours	Lawyer	Short film
1985	Unfinished Business	Geoff	Feature film
1987	Warm Nights on a Slow Moving Train	Football Coach	Feature film
1987	High Tide	Col	Feature film
1987	Perhaps Love	Ben	TV movie
1988	The Everlasting Secret Family	Mayor	Feature film
1988	Sebastian and the Sparrow	Country Cop	Feature film
1988	Breaking Loose: Summer City II	Neville	Feature film
1988	Boundaries of the Heart	Sergeant Riley	Feature film
1988	To Make a Killing	Graham Price	Feature film
1988	Out of the Body	Sergeant Whittaker	Feature film
1989	Cappuccino	Max	Feature film
1991	Strangers	Agent	TV movie
1992	The Time Game	Detective Wills	TV movie
1992	The Last Man Hanged	Father John Brosnan	TV movie
1993	Shotgun Wedding	Superintendent Church	Feature film
1993	Joh's Jury	Judge John Helman	TV movie
1994	Police Rescue	Inspector Bill Adams	TV movie
1997	976-WISH	Volleyball Jock	Short film
2001	My Husband, My Killer	Jim Rope	TV movie
2003	Subterano	Bruce	Feature film

=== Television ===
Title	Year	Role	Type
1972-73	Matlock Police	Glen Roberts /Zeke Jones	TV series, 2 episodes
1973	Ryan	Hunt / Harry	TV series, 2 episodes
1973	Stacey's Gym		TV miniseries
1974	Marion	Tom Carruthers	TV miniseries, 3 episodes
1974	This Love Affair		TV series, 1 episode
1971-74	Homicide	Det. Const. Deegan / Dave Parsons / Sid Bennett	TV series, 3 episodes
1974	Flash Nick from Jindavick	Ned Kelly	TV series, 1 episode
1972-75	Division 4	5 characters	TV series, 5 episodes
1975	Shannon's Mob	Joe	TV series, 1 episode
1976	Luke's Kingdom	Charlton	TV miniseries, 1 episode
1976	Rush	Black Jack Jessop	TV series, 1 episode
1976	Bluey	Bert Thompson	TV series, 1 episode
1977	The Outsiders	Reg McPherson	TV series, 1 episode
1978	Chopper Squad	Sam	TV series, 1 episode
1978	The Young Doctors	Det Sgt Casey	TV series, 1 episode
1979	Doctor Down Under	Mr Frears	TV series, 1 episode
1989	Water Under the Bridge	Rev Scott	TV miniseries, 1 episode
1981	Menotti	Tate	TV series, 1 episode
1983	The Dismissal	Barry Cohen	TV miniseries
1984	City West		TV series, 1 episode
1984	The Last Bastion	Arthur Fadden	TV miniseries, 3 episodes
1984	Bodyline	Mr Bradman	TV miniseries, 2 episodes
1985	Winners	Wal	TV series, 1 episode
1986	Return to Eden	Priest	TV series, 1 episode
1986	Alice to Nowhere	Sgt Wallace	TV miniseries, 2 episodes
1986-87	The Challenge	Ben Lexcen	TV miniseries, 6 episodes
1987	The Harp in the South	Jim	TV miniseries, 3 episodes
1982-87	A Country Practice	Allan Crosby / Vince Glover	TV series, 4 episodes
1987-88	The Flying Doctors	Vince Patterson	TV series, 3 episodes
1988	Joe Wilson	Dick	TV miniseries, 3 episodes
1988-89	Rafferty's Rules	Harry Grant / Briggs	TV series, 2 episodes
1988-99	Home and Away	Danny King / Reverend	TV series, 8 episodes
1989	Cassidy	Harry	TV series, 2 episodes
1991	G.P.	Jack Lockwood	TV series, 1 episode
1989-91	E Street	Sergeant Roy Harrison / Jock Gilmore	TV series, 7 episodes
1989-96	Police Rescue	Inspector Bill Adams	TV series, 61 episodes
1992	Tracks of Glory	Mr Campbell	TV miniseries, 2 episodes
1995	Echo Point	Maurie Barnard	TV series, 130 episodes
1996	One West Waikiki	Detective Dennis Allen	TV series, 1 episode
1997	Water Rats	Ronald Barnsley	TV series, 1 episode
1994-97	Heartbreak High	Don Summers	TV series, 9 episodes
1997	Big Sky	Roland 'Riley' Watson	TV series, 16 episodes
1998	Blue Heelers	Owen Douglas	TV series, 1 episode
1998	Bullpitt!	Judge	TV series, 1 episode
1998	Wildside	Neville Grey	TV series, 2 episodes
1998	The Day of the Roses	Murray Farquhar	TV miniseries, 2 episodes
1999	Farscape	Verell	TV series, 1 episode
1999-2001	All Saints	Clive Cooper / Tony Wilson	TV series, 3 episodes
2000-03	Grass Roots	Harry Bond	TV series, 18 episodes

== Theatre ==
=== As actor ===
Title	Year	Role	Type
1940	Family Affairs		Student Theatre, Brisbane
1948	Carmen	St Peters Boys', Urchin's Chorus	Tivoli Theatre, Adelaide
1965	A Unicorn for Christmas		Independent Theatre, Sydney
1966	Chips with Everything		Independent Theatre, Sydney
1967	Saint Joan		Union Hall, Adelaide
1967	Little Malcolm and His Struggle Against the Eunuchs		Flinders University
1968	The Man on the Left is Joe Bigger from Topeka		La Mama
1971	Norm and Ahmed	Norm	Phillip Street Theatre
1971	The Recruiting Officer		Southern Highlands Festival Theatre
1971	A Streetcar Named Desire		Southern Highlands Festival Theatre
1971	Doctor Faustus		Southern Highlands Festival Theatre
1971	The Roy Murphy Show		Nimrod Street Theatre
1971	Customs and Excise		Nimrod Street Theatre
1971-72	The Chocolate Frog		AMP Theatrette, Sydney, Russell Street Theatre
1972	Cash	Jones	Theatre Royal, Hobart
1972	Major Barbara	Peter Shirley / Bilton	Theatre Royal, Hobart
1972	Richard II	Duke of Aumerle	Theatre Royal, Hobart
1972	The Old Familiar Juice		Russell Street Theatre
1972	A Touch of the Poet		Russell Street Theatre
1972-73	Tom		Russell Street Theatre
1973	Jugglers Three		Playbox Theatre, Melbourne
1975	Too Old for Spring		AMP Theatrette, Sydney, Playhouse Canberra
1975	The Seahorse		UNSW Parade Theatre
1976	A Streetcar Named Desire	Harold Mitchell	Sydney Opera House
1976	The Last of the Knucklemen	Pansy	Playhouse Adelaide, Maitland Town Hall, Port Pirie Town Hall, Whyalla Institute, Port Lincoln Civic Hall, Cowell Institute, Port Augusta College Theatre, Woomera Village Theatre, Peterborough Town Hall, Gladstone Hall, Clare Town Hall
1976	Cowboys #2		Playhouse Adelaide
1977	The Training Run	Constable Jack Kelly	Bondi Pavilion
1977	Fifth Australian National Playwrights' Conference		Canberra
1977	Don't Piddle Against the Wind, Mate	Frank Bourke	Jane Street Theatre
1977	Jack	Tom	Nimrod Upstairs
1978	Mother Courage and Her Children	Mother Courage	Jane Street Theatre
1978	As You Like It	Duke Senior / Duke Frederick	Jane Street Theatre
1978	Giants		Nimrod Downstairs
1978	There were Giants in Those Days	Superman	Nimrod Downstairs
1978	The Job	Sandy	Nimrod Downstairs
1979	You Never Can Tell	Fergus Crampton	SGIO Theatre
1979	Breaker Morant	Lord Kitchener	SGIO Theatre
1979	On Our Selection	Terance Maloney	Jane Street Theatre, Nimrod Upstairs
1979	Waiting for Godot	Pozzo	Jane Street Theatre
1980	The Con Man	Archie Parnell	Wollongong
1980	Happy Family	Mark	Ensemble Theatre
1980	Piaf	Family	Comedy Theatre, Melbourne
1980	A Very Good Year		Stables Theatre
1981	Hamlet	Marcellus / Captain / Sailor	Sydney Opera House
1981	Cat on a Hot Tin Roof	Doctor Waugh	Sydney Opera House
1981	Flexitime	Jim	Phillip Street Theatre
1982	The Cake Man	Circus Style Performer	UNSW Parade Theatre, Universal Theatre Melbourne
1984	An Act of Settlement		Sydney Opera House
1984	The Season at Sarsaparilla		Playhouse Adelaide
1985	Sons of Cain	Laurie Byrne	Playhouse, Melbourne, Theatre Royal, Sydney
1989	Top Silk		Seymour Centre, Melbourne Athenaeum, Canberra Theatre, Playhouse lAdelaide
1989	Lost Weekend		Cremorne Theatre
1993	The Removalists		Lennox Theatre, Parramatta
1993	Lumps		Q Theatre, Penrith
1995	The Last Yankee		Ensemble Theatre
1996	Resurrected		Lennox Theatre, Parramatta
1996	Rough Justice		Ensemble Theatre

=== As director ===
Title	Year	Role	Type
1968	La Streega	Director	La Mama
