= Newsfront =

- Original US film poster
- Directed by: Phillip Noyce
- Written by: Phillip Noyce; Bob Ellis
- Based on: a concept by David Elfick & Philippe Mora
- Produced by: David Elfick
- Starring: Bill Hunter; Wendy Hughes; Bryan Brown; Gerard Kennedy
- Cinematography: Vince Monton
- Edited by: John Scott
- Music by: William Motzing
- Distributed by: Roadshow Entertainment
- Release date: 29 July 1978
- Running time: 110 minutes
- Country: Australia
- Language: English
- Budget: AU$600,000 (est.)
- Box office: AU$1,576,000 (Australia)

Newsfront is a 1978 Australian drama film directed by Phillip Noyce, and starring Bill Hunter, Wendy Hughes, Chris Haywood and Bryan Brown. The screenplay is written by David Elfick, Bob Ellis, Philippe Mora, and Noyce. The original music score is composed by William Motzing. Shot on location in Sydney, Australia, the film is shot both in black and white and in colour, incorporating actual newsreel footage.

== Plot summary ==
Newsfront is about newsreel cameramen and production staff who are committed to finding compelling footage of newsworthy events. The film begins in 1948 and ends in 1956, when television was introduced to Australia, tracking the destinies of two brothers, their adventures and misadventures placed in the context of sweeping social and political changes in their native Australia as well as natural disasters. Len Maguire is constitutionally resistant to change, while his younger brother Frank Maguire welcomes any alterations in his own life and in the world around him.

Events covered in the film include Robert Menzies' return as Prime Minister of Australia, the 1951 referendum to ban the Communist Party, Post-war immigration to Australia, the combatting of the rabbit plague, the Redex Reliability Trial, the 1955 Hunter Valley floods, the 1956 Summer Olympics and the 1956 introduction of television in Australia.

== Cast ==
- Bill Hunter as Len Maguire
- Wendy Hughes as Amy Mackenzie
- Gerard Kennedy as Frank Maguire
- Chris Haywood as Chris Hewitt
- John Ewart as Charlie
- John Clayton as Cliff
- Angela Punch McGregor as Fay
- Don Crosby as A.G. Marwood
- Bryan Brown as Geoff
- Mark Holden as Len's new assistant
- Drew Forsythe as Bruce
- Ray Meagher as Len's second brother
- Bruce Spence as Redex trial driver
- Les Foxcroft as Redex trial driver
- Brian Blain as Fred
- Anne Haddy as A.G.'s wife
- Jude Kuring as Geoff's wife
- John Flaus as Father Coughlan
- Tony Barry as Greasy
- Gerry Duggan as Len's father
- Lorna Lesley as Ellie
- Kit Taylor as Fay's brother
- Steve Bisley as Iceman
- Peter Carroll as Newsco scriptwriter
- Miles Buchanan
- Beth Buchanan
- Alexander Archdale

== Production ==
Phil Noyce showed a copy of his short film Castor and Pollux to David Elfick, a magazine publisher who had made a number of successful surf movies. Elfick, along with Mike Molloy and Philippe Mora, had been discussing making a film about newsreel cameramen of the 1940s and 1950s who worked for such companies as Movietone and Cinesound Productions.

Elfick hired Bob Ellis to write the screenplay because he admired The Legend of King O'Malley, a play Ellis co-wrote with Michael Boddy. Ellis says he wrote the first draft with Howard Rubie, who had been a cameraman for Cinesound and thought he was going to direct the film. Anne Brooksbank later contributed to the script. Noyce was hired as director and worked with Ellis. Ellis fell out with Noyce and demanded his name be taken off the credits. Ellis reflected upon the experience in a 1996 interview:

There was some nonsense about how long it was; we'd set it out, one short scene per page and it finally came out about 300 pages or so but, in fact, it was maybe two and a quarter hours long, which wasn't too bad then or now for something that covered 10 years. But a legend started about how huge it was. When I saw it, I was appalled. I could only see what was missing and abruptly took my name off it. Then when it won all the prizes, I sort of shamefacedly put my name back on it. It was a quite painful experience and I think a very good film, but not as good a film as might have been made. One of the models for it was the film, Yanks, which was a moment in history in particular culture perfectly captured. It had a lot more than the politics in it but, partly because of the budget and partly because of the length, it was pruned back to the politics. Now, the politics was all there in the original but it was surrounding other things, such as the way people spent their Christmases. That was removed.

Funding was provided by the Australian Film Commission and the New South Wales Film Corporation.

== Release ==
The film was shown at Cannes in 1978 and proved popular. The New South Wales Film Corporation insisted seven minutes of the movie be cut out for overseas release.

Newsfront was released on DVD in 2016, bringing a historically lauded Australian film to a worldwide audience. The film's production history is explored in a DVD commentary featuring cast and crew. DVD extras include "The Last Newsreel", Australian Newsreel No. 2032 directed by Karen Borger in 1990. Other extensive DVD-ROM study materials include an in-depth production history, an archive of reviews, and a detailed account of Newsfront's DVD restoration.

=== Box office ===
Newsfront grossed $1,576,000 at the box office in Australia, equivalent to $6,713,760 in 2009 dollars. David Elfick estimated the film recovered its costs two years after opening in Australia.

== Awards and nominations ==
=== Won ===
  - AFI Awards 1978:
- Best Achievement in Costume Design
- Best Achievement in Editing
- Best Achievement in Production Design
- Best Actor in Lead Role: Bill Hunter
- Best Actress in Supporting Role: Angela Punch McGregor
- Best Director
- Best Film
- Best Screenplay
  - Belgian Film Critics Association Awards 1978: Grand Prix

=== Nominated ===
  - AFI Awards 1978:
- Best Achievement in Cinematography
- Best Achievement in Sound
- Best Actor in Supporting Role: Don Crosby
- Best Actor in Supporting Role: Chris Haywood
- Best Actress in Lead Role: Wendy Hughes
- Best Original Music Score
