= Jack Ellis (writer) =

Australian writer

- Born: 1978 (age 47–48); Sydney, Australia
- Occupation: Writer
- Spouse: Alice
- Parents: Bob Ellis (father); Anne Brooksbank (mother)
- Website: www.jackellis.com.au

Jack Ellis (born 1978) is an Australian writer, actor, singer, composer and family mediator.

== Biography ==
Ellis was born in Sydney to writer parents Bob Ellis and Anne Brooksbank. During his childhood and teens he worked as an actor. He went on to study classical composition at Sydney Conservatorium of Music, then spent a year studying at the Royal Conservatorium in The Hague on scholarship. He taught English while living in Cambodia, then moved back to Australia and did a Master's of Dispute Resolution at the University of Technology Sydney. He has also completed a Juris Doctor in law. He works as a family mediator, teaches mediation and dispute resolution, and lives with his wife and son in Sydney.

== Career ==
=== Writing career ===
Ellis's latest novel, Home and Other Hiding Places, was published by Ultimo Press in February 2022. The Australian Book Reviewer Debra Adelaide wrote of the book, "it is a special kind of novelist who can write about young characters yet still engage the adult reader. It’s also a special book that can handle the burden of what cover quotes are fond of labelling ‘warm-hearted’ or ‘big-hearted’ fiction. To me, such descriptions usually mean the kiss of death for credibility, but warmheartedness is exactly what Jack Ellis's Home and Other Hiding Places delivers, without lapsing into sentimentality." His first novel, The Best Feeling of All, was published by Arcadia in March 2014. He also writes articles for publications including Australian Women's Health magazine, The Drum, Mamamia, Crikey and Mum Central.

=== Acting career ===
- House Rules (2014 reality TV series)
- Take Away (2003 film)
- Crackerjack (2002 film)
- Water Rats (1999 TV series)
- Two Hands (1999 film)
- Echo Point (1995 TV series, played Marty Radcliffe)
- G.P. (1992–1993 TV series)
- Point Break (1991 film)
- Emoh Ruo (1985 film, played Jack Tunkley)

=== Music career ===
After studying composition in The Hague under Dutch composer and pianist Louis Andriessen, Ellis recorded two albums of his original songs with his funk-rock band Zanica. He is now a solo singer/songwriter who plays guitar on his own tracks.
