= Perhaps Love (1987 film) =

- Written by: Bob Ellis
- Directed by: Lex Marinos
- Starring: Anne Grigg
- Countries of origin: Australia; France
- Original language: English

Production
- Producer: Jan Chapman

Original release
- Network: ABC
- Release: 6 March 1988

Perhaps Love is a 1987 Australian television film about a love affair between a Frenchman and an Australian.

== Plot ==
Student radicals, Patric and Annie, have an affair in Bali in the 1960s. They promise to meet up in Kathmandu but she returns to Melbourne, marries a left-wing politician, Jack, and has children. Patric and Annie meet up 18 years later. He is now more politically conservative, but they rekindle their affair. She decides to leave her husband and family, but changes her mind.

== Cast ==
- Francois Dunoyer as Patric
- Anne Grigg as Annie
- John Sheerin as Jack
- John Clayton as Ben
- Nathaniel Hawkins as Matt
- Kendall Monaghan as Susie
- Lynne Murphy as Mother

== Production ==
It was the first of a proposed nine TV movies that were made as a part of a co-production deal between Revcom and ABC. Three were to be made in Australia, three in Europe with Australians; the common theme was to be "sentiment". (The other Australian movies were The Lizard King and Going Price aka A Matter of Convenience.) Filming was complete by June 1986 and involved shooting in the Philippines.

== Reception ==
In August 1986 the Sydney Morning Herald reported that "the ABC have kept quiet about" the movie, "and understandably so."

The film did not screen until March 1988. The Sydney Morning Herald TV critic said the film had "endless boring flashbacks" and "the inedible print of its writer, Bob Ellis, who has made a career out of sardonically attacking the middle classes, ate into the script to an unimaginative degree." She also claimed "the ending was rather too twee."
