= Down Under (play) =

Australian play

- Written by: Bob Ellis; Anne Brooksbank
- Original language: English
- Subject: Australian life
- Genre: comedy
- Setting: Sydney, Australia

Premiere
- Date premiered: September 4, 1975
- Place premiered: Stables Theatre, Sydney

Down Under is a 1975 Australian play by Bob Ellis and Anne Brooksbank.

The original production had a cast that included Carmen Duncan and Bill Hunter.

The Sydney Morning Herald critic said "this may be the best and bitchiest play since Don's Party." The Bulletin said the writers "have skilfully constructed a good solid three-acter which accurately and entertainingly reflects -the times, yet in its emotional sterility goes no further."

Towards the end of the play's run at the Nimrod, Ellis and Brooksbank bought the theatre. Ellis later said they bought it when Down Under was "under threat of eviction".

The play was published by Currency Press.
