= John Hepworth (writer) =

Australian writer (1921–1995)

- Born: 4 September 1921; Pinjarra, Western Australia
- Died: 24 January 1995 (aged 73)
- Occupations: Author, journalist
- Partner: Oriel Gray

John Hepworth (4 September 1921 – 24 January 1995) was an Australian author and journalist, best known for his "Outsight" column in Nation Review magazine, which he edited for several years.

== Career ==
He was born in Pinjarra, Western Australia, and moved to Perth as a young boy. He attended Perth Modern School.

With the outbreak of World War II, he enlisted and served in South-west Asia, Ceylon (now Sri Lanka), and New Guinea.

He wrote the regular "Outsight" column for Nation Review and was its editor for several years, then contributed to Toorak Times, the eccentric weekly newspaper published by Jack Pacholli (1929–2004).

He also worked for the ABC, earning the attention of ASIO as a Communist sympathiser.

He died from lung cancer.

== Family ==
He had a longterm relationship with writer Oriel Gray, with whom he had two sons, Peter and Nicholas. Peter Hepworth (1948 – 2011) had a successful career as a television screenwriter, including writing episodes for such serials as The Sullivans, The Flying Doctors, The Henderson Kids and Blue Heelers.

== Bibliography ==
- The Long Green Shore Pan Macmillan Australia (1995) ISBN 0330357034 written for a Sydney Morning Herald literary contest
- Lurie, Morris (ed) John Hepworth ... His Book (a collection of his "Outsight" articles, illustrated by Michael Leunig) Angus and Robertson 1978 ISBN 0207136270
- The Last of the Rainbow Yackandandah Playscripts (1963) ISBN 0868050547
- The Multitude of Tigers (1990)
- (with John Hindle) Boozing Out in Melbourne Town (1980)
- Around the Bend (an account of a 1983 rafting trip he undertook with Hindle and Patrick Amer down the River Murray and filmed by an ABC camera crew)
- Little Australian Library Dynamo House ISBN 0949266000
- (with Michael Leunig) The Almanac of Unspeakable Colonial Acts Dynamo House (1986) ISBN 0949266191
- The Beast in View stage play

For children:

- (with Bob Ellis) Top Kid Puffin (1985) ISBN 0140084126 based on Ellis's television drama
- (with Bob Ellis) The Paper Boy Puffin (1985) ISBN 0140084150 based on Ellis's television drama
- (with Steve Spears) The Big Wish Puffin (1990) ISBN 0140144625 based on Spears' television drama for Australian Children's Television Foundation

== Sources ==
Wilde, William; H. Hooton, Joy and Andrews, Barry The Oxford Companion to Australian Literature Oxford University Press 1985 ISBN 0 19 553381 X
