= Di Smith =

Australian actress

- Occupation: Actress
- Notable work: The Restless Years; A Country Practice

Di Smith, also credited as Diane Smith, is an Australian actress. She played Jenny Harper on The Restless Years for over two years and Dr Alex Fraser on A Country Practice for three years. For the latter she was nominated for the 1989 Logie Award for Most Outstanding Actress. She was a presenter on The Great Outdoors for ten years until 2006.

Smith graduated from NIDA in 1978 and has appeared in Kingswood Country, Cop Shop, Home Sweet Home, Skyways and Emoh Ruo. On stage she appeared in Trafford Tanzi and Steaming (Comedy Theatre, 1990) and was part of comedy group The Disposable Faces from 1989 with the group joining 2DAY-FMs breakfast lineup in 1990.

Smith ran as a Labor candidate for Wentworth against Malcolm Turnbull in the 2013 national elections.
