= The James Dossier =

1973 Australian musical

The James Dossier is a 1973 Australian musical about Francis James written by Bob Ellis with music by Patrick Flynn.

It was originally produced as The Francis James Dossier in 1973 then was revamped for a 1975 production.

The Sydney Morning Herald said it "deserves a longer life".
