= Anne Brooksbank =

Australian writer (born 1943)

- Born: Anne Mary Brooksbank; 1943 (age 82–83); Melbourne
- Occupations: Screenwriter, novelist, educator
- Spouse: Bob Ellis
- Children: Jack Ellis

Anne Mary Brooksbank (born 1943) is an Australian writer. She has written a number of novels as well as scripts for film and TV.

She has taught screenwriting at The Australian Film Television and Radio School.

== Personal life ==
She was born in Melbourne. She completed an MA in English literature and history at Melbourne University and studied painting at the National Gallery School before becoming a professional writer.

She was married to Bob Ellis, with whom she occasionally collaborated; they had three children, including the author Jack Ellis.

== Novels ==
- Mad Dog Morgan (1976)
- Archer (1985)
- On Loan (1990)
- All My Love (1991)
- Marriage Acts (2000)
- Mother's Day (2005)
- Sir Katherine
- Big Thursday
- Father's Day
- Don't I Know You? (2024)

== Select film and TV credits ==
- Avengers of the Reef (1973)
- Newsfront (1975) (with Bob Ellis) (winner of AACTA Best Screenplay Award)
- Down Under (play) (1975) (with Bob Ellis)
- Case for the Defence (1978)
- Maybe This Time (1980)
- The Winds of Jarrah (1983)
- Land of Hope (1986)
- Marriage Acts (2000)
- All My Love (2015), a play about Henry Lawson and Mary Gilmore's relationship.
- Don't Tell (2017)
