= The Lizard King (film) =

- Directed by: Geoffrey Nottage
- Written by: Louis Nowra
- Based on: Elizabeth Ford
- Produced by: Jan Chapman
- Starring: Marie-Christine Barrault; John Hargreaves
- Cinematography: Jeffrey Malouf
- Edited by: Bill Russo
- Music by: Martin Armiger
- Production company: ABC Revcom
- Release date: 28 February 1988
- Running time: 96 mins
- Country: Australia
- Language: English

The Lizard King is a 1988 Australian television film about a woman who comes from France to Australia in search of her son.

== Production ==
It was one of a series of TV movies that were made as a part of a co production deal between Revcom and ABC. Three were to be made in Australia, three in Europe with Australians; the common theme was to be "sentiment". (The other Australian movies were A Matter of Convenience and Perhaps Love.)

The movie was based on an idea by director Geoffrey Nottage. Producer Jan Chapman had just made two telemovies written by Louis Nowra and hired Nowra to write the script. Nowra was reluctant to work on a project that came from someone else's idea but enjoyed collaborating with Chapman and had just read Jules Verne's Mistress Branican which had a similar plot and felt the offer was too serendipitous to refuse. Nowra later said he thought Nottage did a good job as director but was dissatisfied with the limitations of working for television.
