= Goodbye Paradise =

1983 Australian film

- DVD cover
- Directed by: Carl Schultz
- Written by: Bob Ellis; Denny Lawrence
- Produced by: Jane Scott
- Starring: Ray Barrett; Paul Chubb; Guy Doleman
- Cinematography: John Seale
- Edited by: Richard Francis-Bruce
- Music by: Peter Best
- Production companies: Petersham Pictures; NSW Film Corporation
- Distributed by: Filmways
- Release date: 1983
- Running time: 119 minutes
- Country: Australia
- Language: English
- Budget: $1.1 million (AUS)

Goodbye Paradise is a 1983 Australian film directed by Carl Schultz starring Ray Barrett. It has been called "the greatest Queensland film ever made."

== Premise ==
On Queensland's Gold Coast, a disgraced former cop, Michael Stacey, is writing a long-delayed book exposing police corruption. To make some money he accepts a job from an old acquaintance, Senator McCredie, to locate the senator's missing daughter Kathy.

He encounters a series of unusual characters, including members of the Queensland secession movement and a cult led by Stacey's old army friend Todd.

== Cast ==
- Ray Barrett as Michael Stacy
- Paul Chubb as Curly
- Guy Doleman as Quiney
- Kate Fitzpatrick as Mrs. McCreadie
- Lex Marinos as Con
- Robyn Nevin as Kate
- Don Pascoe as Senator McCredie
- Janet Scrivener as Kathy
- John Clayton as Todd
- Frank Gallacher as Keith
- Carole Skinner as Landlady
- Kris McQuade as Hooker
- Grant Dodwell as Seaworld boy

== Production ==
=== Development ===
The idea of doing a Raymond Chandler-type story set on the Gold Coast came from Denny Lawrence. His original idea was to have an ex-police officer working as a private investigator who investigated a quasi-religious commune run by a charlatan that ended with the deaths of many of the commune's followers. Then the Jonestown Massacre happened and Lawrence backed away from this idea.

He then pitched the idea to Bob Ellis, who liked it and the two of them agreed to work together. Ellis said Lawrence "came to me and simply said, 'Surfers Paradise. Ray Barrett. Raymond Chandler.' And that was it."

They always envisioned Ray Barrett in the lead role as the private eye Stacey and the three of them got some money from the NSW Film Corporation to go up to Surfers Paradise for a week to research and write the script.

Many of Ray Barrett's characteristics found their way into the character of Stacey. Barrett:

Bob is a great observer, and when I finally read the script, I thought "You bugger; you've observed Barrett!" But I didn't mind. I was flattered because Stacey is a living person. He is a failure, really, but a loveable failure; a kind man at heart. Yet everything's slipped by him and he hasn't achieved the things he's wanted to. The character relates to a lot of people, including myself. Bob's put the finger on it. He's brilliant.

According to Lawrence, he was more interested in a genre piece whereas Ellis tried to incorporate his personal politics, but the collaboration was a successful one and the two men would work again many times in the following years.

The film was financed by the NSW Film Commission under Paul Riomfalvy.

The NSW Film Commission wanted Michael Thornhill to direct but he wanted several changes to the script and Ellis and Lawrence insisted that Carl Schultz direct. "The script was so good all I had to do was follow it, which I did, religiously," said Schultz. "It was so packed with detail that it didn't really need me. I suppose my task was to unify all the different elements."

=== Casting ===
Bob Ellis claimed the producer wanted to cast Max Gillies in the lead instead of Barrett.

Janet Scrivener was a young model. Many of the roles were written for specific actors. Robyn Nevin said "I very much like my part because it's different from anything I've done before. It's a bit mad, and rather fun to be doing the sort of role you'd never think of casting yourself in." The character of Quiney was meant to be played by Anthony Quayle but Guy Doleman was cast instead.

=== Filming ===
The movie was shot in the winter of 1981 in and around Surfers Paradise over eight weeks.

== Release ==
In September 1982, 12 months after filming completed, it was announced the movie had found a distributor, Filmways - with a release planned for November. However the film was not released in Sydney until July 1983. "Distributors kept telling me that it was 'unconventional' and 'too difficult to handle'," said Scott.

== Awards ==
The film was nominated for 4 AFI Awards, won in the Best Actor in the Lead Role (Ray Barrett) and Best Screenplay, Original or Adapted (Bob Ellis, Denny Lawrence) categories. John Seale won the Cinematographer of the Year award of the Australian Cinematographers Society. These took place in October 1982 before the film had been released.

The movie also won Best Film and Best Actor at the Sydney Film Critics Circle Awards.

== Reception ==
Filmnews wrote "you can't help but feel that despite the excesses, there's a good film in there somewhere. And, if only as an object lesson in the pathology of contemporary Australian filmmaking, it deserves to be seen."

The Bulletin wrote "Although it comes out of the traditions of hard-boiled Californian fiction, it’s not a museum-piece. It has a life of its own and an essentially Australian character."

== Sequel ==
Bob Ellis and Denny Lawrence wrote a sequel for the film called Goodbye Adelaide. The plot involved Stacy finishing the book he is writing in the first movie and visiting the Adelaide Festival to promote it, where he is caught up in an attempted defection by a Russian poet. In January 1985 The Age reported the film would be made that year with a budget of $3 million. However, the movie was never made.

The movie was one of a number of films sold by the NSWFC to the Pepper Group.

== Notes ==
- Murray, Scott (1994). Australian Cinema. St.Leonards, NSW.: Allen & Unwin/AFC. p. 257. ISBN 1-86373-311-6.
