= Emoh Ruo =

- Directed by: Denny Lawrence
- Written by: Paul Leadon; David Poltorak
- Produced by: David Elfick
- Starring: Joy Smithers; Martin Sacks; Philip Quast; Genevieve Mooy
- Cinematography: Andrew Lesnie
- Edited by: Ted Otton
- Music by: Cameron Allan
- Distributed by: Greater Union
- Release date: 26 September 1985
- Running time: 93 minutes
- Country: Australia
- Language: English
- Budget: A$1,500,000
- Box office: A$34,000

Emoh Ruo is a 1985 Australian comedy film directed by Denny Lawrence and starring Joy Smithers and Martin Sacks.

== Plot ==
The Tunkleys move from a caravan park into a suburban home goes wrong.

== Reception ==
Andrew Urban wrote that "Emoh Ruo relies on stereotypes, but it does so with larrikin good humour, and lets us enjoy a big, lowbrow finish." The Sydney Morning Herald stated "Emoh Ruo is a pleasant entertainment, but less than memorable". Writing in Cinema Papers Christine Cremen says "With its lively combination of satire, sentimentality, near-tragedy and pratfall farce, Emoh Ruo resembles one of the better Preston Sturges comedies". Writing in the book Australian Film, 1978-1994: A Survey of Theatrical Features Bruce Sandow states "More light-hearted situation comedy than biting satire, the film has its amusing moments. Competently made and entertaining in a lowbrow way, it has no pretensions to social comment. But its resorting to well-known Australian stereotypes is more often witless than inspired." A review in Variety finishes "Overall, Emoh Ruo might just be the success the Australian film industry is looking for right now".

== Awards ==
Emoh Ruo was nominated for an AFI Awards for Best Actress in a Supporting Role for Genevieve Mooy.

== Cast ==
- Joy Smithers - Terri Tunkley
- Martin Sacks - Des Tunkley
- Jack Ellis - Jack Tunkley
- Philip Quast - Les Tunkley
- Louise Le Nay - Helen Tunkley
- Joanna Burgess - Tunkley Twin
- Nathalie Burgess - Tunkley Twin
- Genevieve Mooy - Margaret York
- Max Phipps - Sam Tregado
- Bill Young - Wally Wombat
- Helen McDonald - Pat Harrison
- Mervyn Drake - Warren Harrison
- Noel Hodda - Pete
- Richard Carter - Thommo
- Di Smith - Cheryl Mason
- Lance Curtis - Wayne Mason
- Garry Who - Policeman
- Charito Ortez - Sam's Receptionist
- Rainee Skinner - Teller
- John Spicer - Magistrate
- Ray Marshall - Clarrie
- Tracey Higginson - Surfer Girl
- Angelo D'Angelo - Surfer Guy
- Suzanne Dudley - Supervisor
- Zafar Khan - Indian Couple
- Azra Khan - Indian Couple
- Ian McGowan - Des' Bus Driving Double
- Archie - George Harrison

== Soundtrack ==
Emoh Ruo

Soundtrack album by various artists
- Released: 1985
- Label: Regular Records
- Producer: Cameron Allen

Side A

1. " Our Home" (Instrumental) (John Clifforth) - 2:01
2. "Build It Right" (Barnum and Barnum) performed by The Vitabeats - 3:46
3. "I Don't Dream" (Gangga Jang) performed by Gang Gajang - 3:24
4. "Made for You" (Clifforth, C.Allen and M.Callaghan) performed by Broderick Smith and Vanetta Field- 3:46
5. "Our Home" (Clifforth) performed by John Clifforth - 2:57
6. "Path of Stone" (Callaghan and Graham Bidstrup) performed by Stetsons - 6:19

Side B

1. "Terry Through a Fish Tank" - 2:17
2. "The Tunkleys Leave Home" - 3:20
3. "A Shark in the Bath" - 0:55
4. "Sam Tregado in an Asian Mood" - 1:06
5. "Sam Tregado in a Greek Mood" - 2:03
6. "Des Builds a B.B.Q. - 2:14
7. "The Jaguar Samba" - 3:14
8. "Made for You" (Instrumental) - 4:07

== See also ==
- Cinema of Australia
