= At Last... Bullamakanka: The Motion Picture =

- Directed by: Simon Heath
- Written by: Simon Heath
- Produced by: David Joseph
- Starring: Steve Rackman; Gary Kliger; Alyson Best; Robert Baxter; Angry Anderson
- Cinematography: David Eggby
- Edited by: John Scott
- Production company: Bullamakanka Film Productions
- Distributed by: Thorn EMI (video)
- Release date: 1983
- Running time: 89 minutes
- Country: Australia
- Language: English
- Budget: A$1.2 million

At Last... Bullamakanka: The Motion Picture is a 1983 Australian comedy film directed by Simon Heath and starring Steve Rackman, Gary Kliger, Alyson Best, Robert Baxter, and Angry Anderson, Adrian Bernotti The plot is about a small town visited by a government official. It is noticeable for the number of music acts that appear.

== Premise ==
Rhino Jackson is seeking re-election as Mayor. He works with his son Taldo to hold a concert and win a horse race.

Claire and her father Walter own a property being taken over by Jackson.

== Cast ==
- Steve Rackman as Rhino Jackson
- Gary Kliger as Waldo Jackson
- Alyson Best as Clare Hampton
- Robert Baxter as Senator
- Angry Anderson as Senator's Aide
- Bassia Carole as Sister Mary
- Debbie Matts as Maureen
- John Stone as Wally
- Mark Hembrow as L D
- Iain Gardiner as T M
- Frank Thring as Television Producer
- Molly Meldrum as a priest
- John Farnham as a policeman
- Derryn Hinch as a gangster henchman
- Peter Russell Clarke as a gangster henchman
- Gordon Elliott as a gangster
- Adrian Bernotti as Rocko
- Norman Coburn as Walter Williams
- Naomi Lisner as Sam

=== Musical acts ===
- Australian Crawl
- Tony Catz Band
- Jo Jo Zep and the Falcons
- The Radiators
- Rose Tattoo
- The Skyhooks
- The Sunnyboys
- Wendy And The Rocketts
- Uncanny X-Men

== Production ==
According to David Stratton, "the film had a very troubled and lengthy production history which presumably accounts for the first two words tacked on to the title".
