= Denny Lawrence =

Australian actor, writer, producer and director

- Born: 1952 (age 73–74); London, UK
- Education: NIDA, Australian Film, Television and Radio School
- Occupations: Actor; writer; producer; director
- Years active: 1967-2025

Denny Lawrence (born 1952 in London) is an Australian actor, writer, producer and director of television, theatre and film.

== Early life ==
Lawrence studied at National Institute of Dramatic Art (NIDA) and the Australian Film, Television and Radio School. He also studied under Stella Adler.

== Career ==
Lawrence wrote 1983 feature film Goodbye Paradise, which earned him an Australian Film Institute Award for Best Screenplay. He was a writer and director on 1984 cricket miniseries Bodyline, starring Gary Sweet and Hugo Weaving. The following year, he directed western drama TV movie Archer, starring Nicole Kidman, comedy film Emoh Ruo, and co-wrote comedy/drama film The Coca-Cola Kid, featuring Eric Roberts. In 1987, Lawrence co-wrote the film Warm Nights on a Slow Moving Train, starring Wendy Hughes and Colin Friels.

From 1994, Lawrence was a writer and director on western drama series Banjo Paterson's The Man From Snowy River, the television spin-off of the film of the same name, set 20 years after the title character's famous ride.

In 2000, Lawrence directed the award-winning The Centurion for the BBC. In the early 2000s, Lawrence directed and produced medical defence drama series MDA, which was nominated for Best Television Series at the Australian Film Institute Awards three years in a row, winning in 2004.

Lawrence has also worked extensively as a teacher, both in Australia and abroad, including at Australian Film, Television and Radio School (AFTRS), National Institute of Dramatic Art (NIDA), Australian Writers' Guild (AWG), Victorian College of the Arts (VCA), Queensland University of Technology (QUT), Royal Melbourne Institute of Technology (RMIT), Canadian Film Centre, Boston University, Griffith University, Deakin University, and the Australian Opera School. In 2005, he joined the film and television department at the New York University Tisch School of the Arts. In 2007, he was appointed Head of Acting & Directing and in 2008 also became Head of Television.

== Director / writer / producer credits ==
=== Film ===
Year	Title	Role	Notes	Ref
	The Outing		Short	
1983	Goodbye Paradise	Co-writer		
1985	Emoh Ruo	Director		
1985	The Coca-Cola Kid	Co-writer		
1987	Warm Nights on a Slow Moving Train	Co-writer		
1988	Afraid to Dance	Director		
2008	A Divided Heart	Director / producer		

=== Television ===
Year	Title	Role	Notes	Ref
1975	Scattergood: Friend of All			
1980–1982	The Young Doctors	Director	4 episodes	
	The Restless Years	Director		
1982–1983	Sons and Daughters	Director	55 episodes	
1984	Bodyline	Writer / Director	Miniseries, 7 episodes / 2 episodes	
1985	Palace of Dreams	Writer / director / script editor	Miniseries, 1 episode / 1 episode / 10 episodes	
1985	Archer	Director	TV movie	
1986	Army Wives	Director	TV movie	
1988	The Last Resort	Director		
1988	Australians	Script editor	2 episodes	
1988	Rafferty's Rules	Script editor	10 episodes	
1990; 1994	A Country Practice	Producer / director	86 episodes / 4 episodes	
1991	The Bill	Director	2 episodes	
1992	Butterfly Island	Producer	1 episode	
1994	The Damnation of Harvey McHugh	Director / script editor	Episode: "From Here to Eternity"	
1995	Rainbow's End	Director / producer	TV movie	
1994; 1996	Snowy River: The McGregor Saga	Director / writer	3 episodes / 1 episode	
1997	The Wayne Manifesto	Co-director		
1997–1998	Children’s Hospital	Producer / director	5 episodes / 1 episode	
1998	State Coroner	Director	2 episodes	
2000	Easter Tales	Director	Episode: "The Centurion"	
2000–2001	Something in the Air	Director	10 episodes	
2001–2002	Blue Heelers	Director	4 episodes	
2002–2005	MDA	Producer / director	34 episodes / 2 episodes	
2012	Tricky Business	Producer / director	Miniseries, 13 episodes / 1 episode	

=== Theatre ===
Year	Title	Role	Notes	Ref
1971	The Recruiting Officer	Stage Manager	Southern Highlands Festival Theatre, Mittagong	
1974	Adventures in Fol	Director	Independent Theatre, Sydney	
1975	A Bunch of Ratbags	Director	The Australian Theatre, Sydney	
1987	The Real Thing	Director	Canberra	
1992–1993	Sky	Director	Australian tour with Ensemble Theatre	
1993	The Double Bass	Director	Glen St Theatre, Sydney	
1993	The Old Boy	Director	Ensemble Theatre, Sydney	
2004	Loyal Women	Director	Red Stitch Actors Theatre, Melbourne	
2014	Belleville	Director	Red Stitch Actors Theatre, Melbourne	
2015	Love Love Love	Director	Red Stitch Actors Theatre, Melbourne	
2016	All My Love	Director	Australian tour with HIT Productions	
2016	Always... Patsy Cline	Director	NSW tour & Theatre Royal, Hobart with HIT Productions	
2018	Lovesong	Director	Red Stitch Actors Theatre, Melbourne	
	High Time	Director		
2022	Reunion Day (reading)	Director	AFTRS, Sydney	
2022	Summer of the Seventeenth Doll	Director	Australian tour	
2025	Hawke	Director	Chapel Off Chapel, Melbourne	
	A Woman Knows		Tisch New Theatre, NY	
	A Soldier Dreams		Theatre East, NY	

== Acting credits ==
=== Film ===
Year	Title	Role	Notes	Ref
1993	The Nostradamus Kid	'General Booth Enters Heaven' Strolling Player		

=== Television ===
Year	Title	Role	Notes	Ref
1971	Matlock Police	Reg Vinten	1 episode	
1971	Dynasty	Kidnapper	1 episode	
1972	Number 96	Kit Vansard	13 episodes	
1973	Frank and Francesca			
1974	Homicide	Mike Jarvis	1 episode	
1974	The Misanthrope		TV movie	
1975	Scattergood: Friend of All			

=== Theatre ===
Year	Title	Role	Notes	Ref
1967	The Choephori (The Libation Bearers)	Pylades	UNSW, Sydney with NIDA	
1969	In the Gloaming	Grand-Son Tweed	Jane St Theatre, Sydney with NIDA	
1969	Oh My Darling	Actor	Jane St Theatre, Sydney with NIDA	
1969	Almost Like Being	Chad	Jane St Theatre, Sydney with NIDA	
1970	The Night of the Iguana	Pancho / Jake Latta	NIDA Theatre, Sydney	
1970	Cat on a Hot Tin Roof	Actor	UNSW Old Tote Parade Theatre, Sydney with NIDA	
1970	A Midsummer Night's Dream	Actor	UNSW Old Tote Parade Theatre, Sydney with NIDA	
1970	Blood Wedding	Actor	UNSW Old Tote Parade Theatre, Sydney with NIDA	
1971	Twenty Six Efforts at Pornography	Actor	AMP Theatrette, Sydney with Q Theatre	
1971	Emil and the Detectives	Actor	Southern Highlands Festival Theatre, Mittagong	
1971	Doctor Faustus	Actor	Southern Highlands Festival Theatre, Mittagong	
1972	A Dead Liberty	Actor	AMP Theatrette, Sydney with Q Theatre	
1972	Housey	Actor	Nimrod, Sydney	
1972	Blop Goes The Weazel	Actor	UNSW Old Tote Parade Theatre, Sydney	
1973	Jumpers	Actor	Russell St Theatre, Melbourne with MTC	
1973	The Misanthrope	Actor	UNSW, Sydney	
1974	Unaccompanied Cello	Actor	Independent Theatre, Sydney	
