= Yabba =

Australian sports heckler

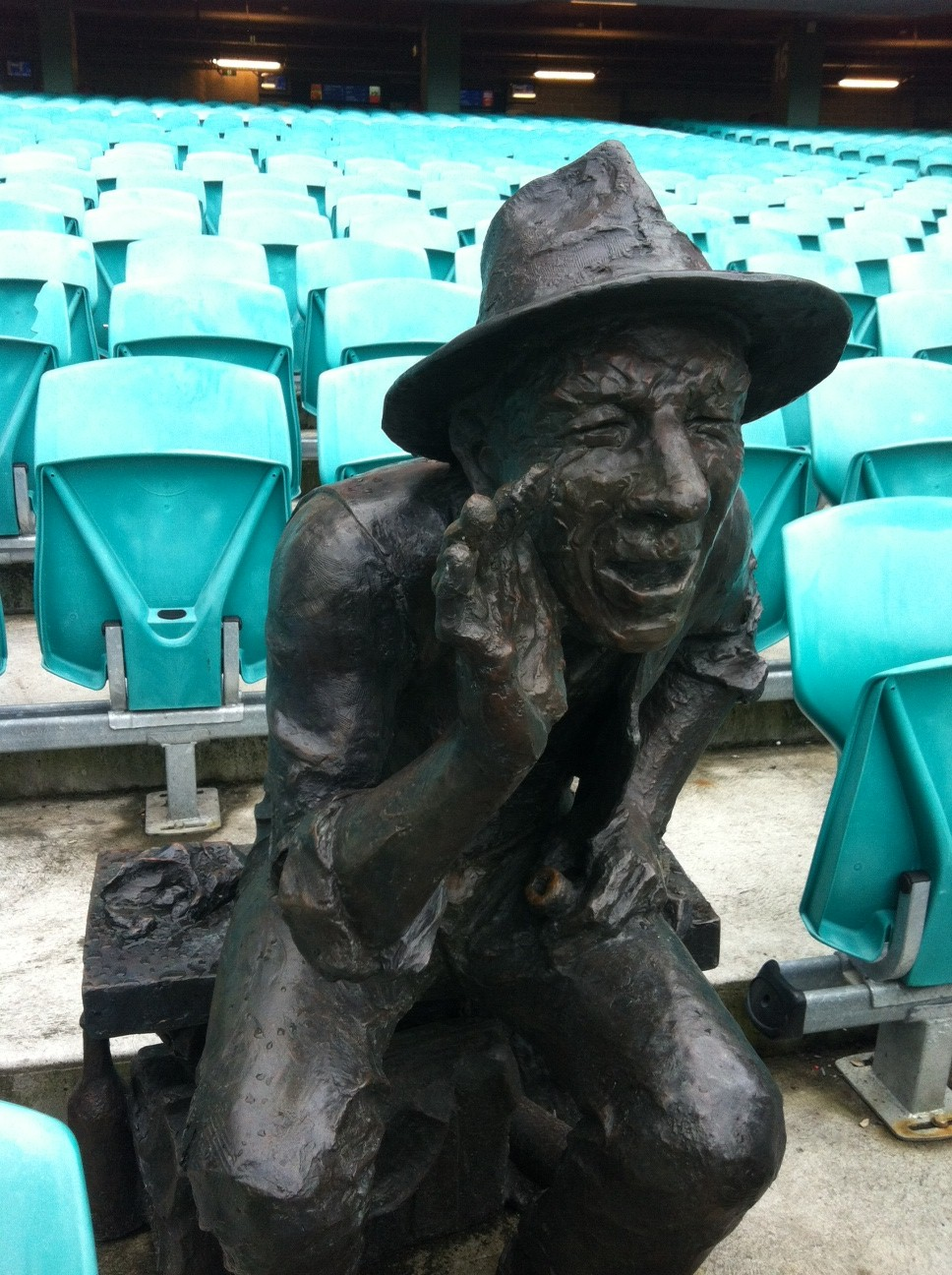
- Statue of Yabba at the Sydney Cricket Ground
- Born: March 19, 1878; Redfern, New South Wales, Australia
- Died: January 8, 1942 (aged 63); Lidcombe, Australia

Stephen Harold Gascoigne, better known as Yabba, (19 March 1878 – 8 January 1942) was an Australian sports fan, remembered as a heckler at Sydney Cricket Ground (SCG) cricket and rugby league games in the early part of the 20th century. Yabba was known for his knowledgeable witticisms shouted from "The Hill", a grassy general admissions area of the SCG.

In Yabba's era, cricket matches were watched like tennis matches, and spectators at the SCG were much quieter than today. This is the reason Yabba's comments were so clearly heard by players and other spectators.

"The Hill" area was replaced with seating in the early 1990s. The new area was then formally named Yabba's Hill in honour of his colourful comments, several of which have passed into cricketing folklore. In 2007 the Doug Walters Stand and Yabba's Hill were demolished to make way for the new Victor Trumper Stand. On 7 December 2008 a bronze statue of Yabba, sculpted by Cathy Weiszmann, was unveiled at the Sydney Cricket Ground in The Hill area of the new stand. It depicts Yabba in a characteristic pose, one hand acting as a megaphone, in the act of delivering one of his famous interjections.

Yabba was portrayed by Paul Chubb in the 1984 mini-series Bodyline.

== Insults ==
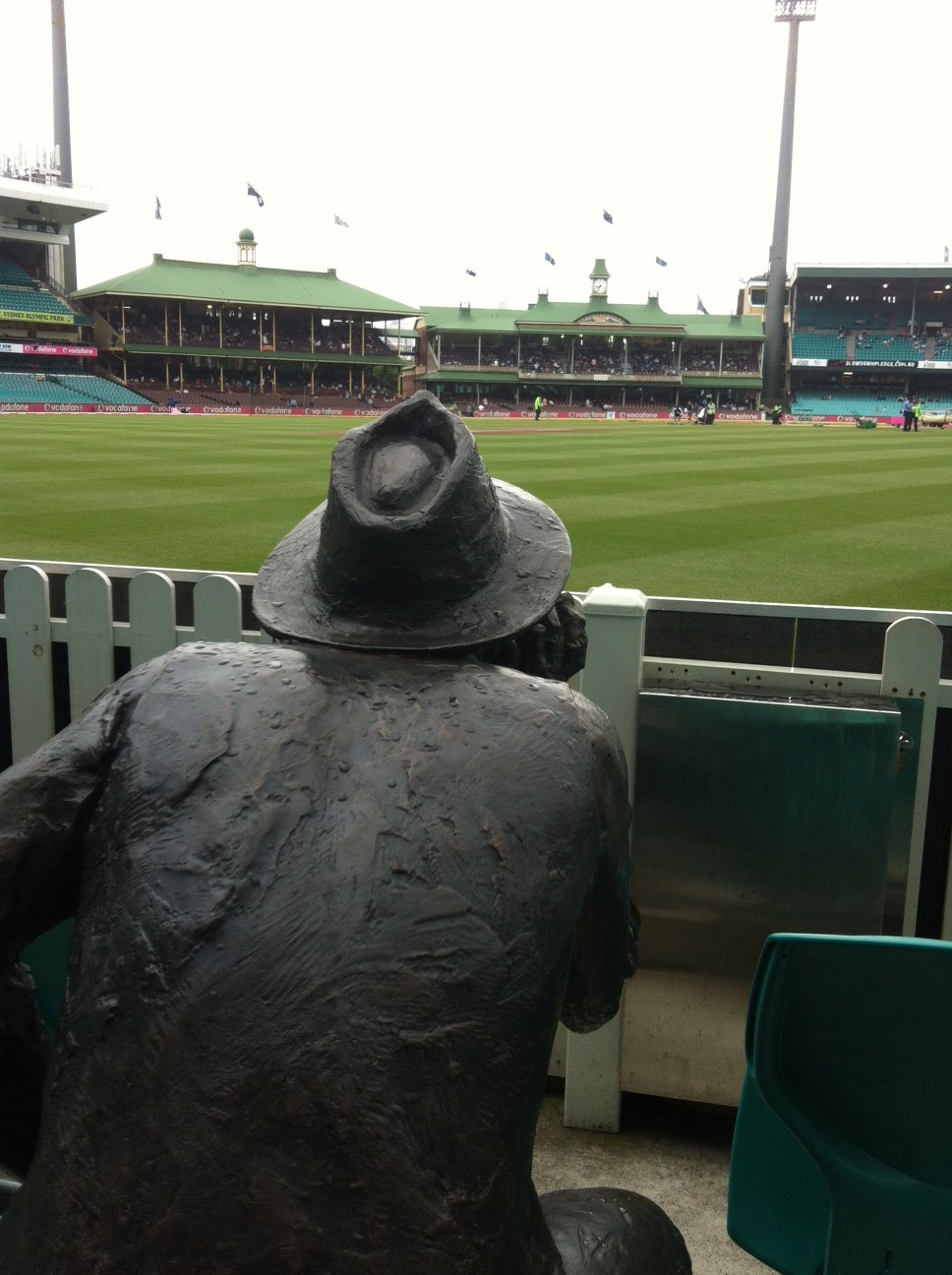
Yabba's view across the pitch of the Sydney Cricket Ground

Some of Yabba's best remembered insults include:

- "I wish you were a statue and I were a pigeon."
- Telling a fly-swatting English cricket captain, Douglas Jardine, to "Leave those flies alone, they are your only friends here."
- "Bowl the bastard a grand piano and see if he can play that instead!"
- "Oh for a strong arm and a walking stick!" (at bad bowling; leg spinner Arthur Mailey, a regular victim of this one, quotes it several times in his book 10 for 66 and All That)
- "Those are the only balls you've touched all day!" (To an English batsman adjusting his box in between overs).
- "Put a penny in him, George, he's stopped registering" (To umpire George Borwick who read gas meters and emptied the cash boxes for a living, when Iftikhar Ali Khan Pataudi was scoring slowly)
- "Your length's lousy but you bowl a good width!" (To an opposition bowler)
