= A Matter of Convenience =

- Written by: Ben Lewin
- Directed by: Ben Lewin
- Starring: Jean-Pierre Cassel; Deborra-Lee Furness; John Clarke
- Country of origin: Australia
- Original language: English

Production
- Producer: Noel Price
- Production company: ABC-Revcon

Original release
- Network: ABC
- Release: 1987

A Matter of Convenience is a 1987 Australian television film about a couple who resort to an arranged marriage as a means of trying to make an income. Ben Lewin won an AACTA Award for Best Direction in Television.

== Plot ==
Velma (Deborra-Lee Furness) works in a butchers and wants a baby, but has no money. Her work shy partner Joe (John Clarke) is resistant to any kind of job. After meeting Alphonse Torontoa (Jean-Pierre Cassel), a Frenchman who arranges weddings for immigrants looking to stay in Australia, Velma becomes a witness to these marriages of convenience. After Joe's rejection of a job in the local chicken factory, she forces him to marry a Lebanese immigrant bride for money.

However Joe is forced to live with her because the officials become suspicious of Alphonse's arranged marriages. This separates Joe from Velma, causing strain to their relationship. Joe falls in love with the Lebanese woman, and things spiral out of control.

== Cast ==
- Deborra-Lee Furness as Valma
- John Clarke as Joe McGuiness
- Jean-Pierre Cassel as Alphonse Toronto
- Mark Little as Roger Purvis
- Nico Lathouris as Tom Galacci
- Kirk Alexander as Registrar 1
- Peter Hosking as Registrar 2
- George Kapiniaris as Immigration Officer
- Reg Gorman as Repo Man
- Peter Moon as Customer

== Production ==
It was one of a series of TV movies that were made as a part of a co production deal between Revcom and ABC. Three were to be made in Australia, three in Europe with Australians; the common theme was to be "sentiment". (The other Australian movies were The Lizard King and Perhaps Love.)
