= Bodyline (miniseries) =

1984 film

- Bodyline (DVD cover)
- Genre: Drama, cricket miniseries
- Directed by: Carl Schultz; George Ogilvie; Denny Lawrence; Lex Marinos
- Starring: Gary Sweet; Hugo Weaving; Jim Holt; Rhys McConnochie; Frank Thring
- Theme music composer: Chris Neal
- Country of origin: Australia
- Original language: English
- No. of episodes: 7

Production
- Running time: 50 minutes
- Production company: Kennedy Miller

Original release
- Network: Network Ten
- Release: 16 July – 19 July 1984

Bodyline is an Australian 1984 television miniseries which dramatised the events of the 1932–1933 English Ashes cricket tour of Australia. The title refers to the bodyline cricketing tactic (also known as fast leg theory) devised by the English cricket team during their 1932–33 Ashes tour of Australia.

== Plot ==
The events leading up to the England Cricket Team's 1932–1933 Ashes tour of Australia and the tactics, of bowling directly at the batsman, used by the English cricket team to counteract the extraordinary batting prowess of Australian cricketer Don Bradman during the Ashes series.

== Cast ==
Main cast members

- Hugo Weaving as Douglas Jardine
- Gary Sweet as Don Bradman
- Jim Holt as Harold Larwood
- Rhys McConnochie as Pelham "Plum" Warner
- John Gregg as Percy Fender
- Heather Mitchell as Edith Clarke

Supporting cast members

- John Walton as Bill Woodfull
- John Doyle as George "Gubby" Allen
- Frank Thring as Lord Harris
- Ashok Banthia as the Nawab of Pataudi
- Jane Harders as Douglas Jardine's Mother
- Julie Nihill as Jessie Bradman
- Max Cullen as Chooka
- Vincent Ball as Joseph Lyons, the Prime Minister of Australia
- Colin Croft as Sir Stanley Jackson
- Richard Carter (credited as "Ric Carter") as Bill Voce
- Bill Young as Bill Bowes
- Alan David Lee as Eddie Paynter
- Terry Bader as Bob Wyatt
- Michael Winchester as Stan McCabe
- Michael O'Neill as Vic Richardson
- Leslie Dayman as Bert Oldfield
- John Sheerin as Bill Ponsford
- Lauri Moran as Bert Ironmonger
- George Whaley as Lord Hawke
- Celia De Burgh as Harold Larwood's Wife
- Reg Gillam as Sir Clive Wigram
- Edward Howell as Lord Hailsham
- Paul Chubb as "Yabba"
- Arthur Dignam as Malcolm Jardine
- John Clayton as Don Bradman's Father
- Peter Whitford as Robertson
- Peter Dahlsen as Les Ames
- Mark Hope as Herbert Sutcliffe
- Michael Jay as Leyland
- Bernard Ledger as George Duckworth
- Doug Middleton as Wally Hammond
- Ron Stephenson as Hedley Verity
- Stewart Faichney as Alan Kippax
- Robert Giltinan as Leo O'Brien
- Ross Hall as Bill O'Reilly
- Scott Lowe as Tim Wall
- Ned Manning as Jack Fingleton
- Peter Philpott as Clarrie Grimmett
- Brian Anderson as Umpire Hele
- Brian McDermott as Frank Packer
- Vivienne Garrett as Postmistress
- Peter Gwynne as Oxlade
- Norman May as Radio Commentator
- Noel Hodda as Vic Bradman

== Production ==
The producers were George Miller, Byron Kennedy and Terry Hayes. The directors were Denny Lawrence, Lex Marinos, George Ogilvie and Carl Schultz. The scriptwriters for the mini-series were Robert Caswell, Lex Marinos, Denny Lawrence and Terry Hayes. The music for the mini-series was written by Chris Neal and Phillip Scott. Photography was by Dean Semler and Andrew Lesnie.

== Historical inaccuracies ==
- The controversial England captain Douglas Jardine is represented early in his career as encouraging a bowler to run out the non-striker backing up without giving a prior warning. Jardine's action is excused in the dramatisation by Lord Harris, who is represented as saying he had done the same in his playing career. While this represents Jardine's (and his supporters') perceived willingness to resort to sharp practice, there is in fact no evidence that Jardine or Harris initiated such an instance as captains, and no record of such an incident in first-class cricket.
- The third test at Adelaide is correctly represented as a nadir of relations between the two teams and the two countries, specifically over an incident when Bert Oldfield was hit over the head while batting against Harold Larwood. However, Oldfield apparently top-edged the delivery in question into his face, and Larwood was not actually bowling leg theory or Bodyline at the time. On regaining consciousness, Oldfield, a tough character, is reputed to have said: "My own fault." Further, Oldfield missed one Test, as opposed to the remainder of the season.
- In the fourth test at Brisbane, Eddie Paynter is correctly represented as rising from his sick bed to reignite England's challenge and help with clinching the victory that regained the Ashes, a display of pluck well received by the home crowd, and is correctly depicted as clinching the win with a six in the second innings. However, he is represented as playing an extensive innings in the second innings featuring numerous scoring shots, when in fact he finished 14 not out, and his innings featuring only three scoring shots. (In contrast, he made 83 in the first innings at a crucial stage.)
- Jardine and his tactics are correctly represented as falling out of favour by 1934. However, it is not represented that in a test match against West Indies in 1933 Jardine was on the receiving end of leg theory bowling himself and stood up well to the examination, making a career best 127.
- Jardine is presented as placing The Ashes urn in the trophy cabinet at Lord’s, indicating that the team were presented with the urn for winning the series. In fact, the urn has never been used as a trophy - it is a permanent exhibit in the MCC Cricket Museum at Lord’s.
- Jardine is presented as having his Test career ended after a tour of India during the following year when equivalent tactics gave rise to vociferous protests. In fact, the accounts in Wisden of test matches during that tour make no mention of such protests, and the most successful England bowler on the tour was a slow bowler, Hedley Verity, although at time leg theory was used by bowlers on both sides.
- Harold Larwood is largely correctly represented as being made a scapegoat by the English cricket establishment for the hostility engendered during the series: however, Larwood later settled in Australia, and became a popular figure there, living there from 1950 until his death in 1995.

== Broadcast ==
The mini-series was a huge ratings success in Australia, earning a share of 40%.

The UK premiere of the 5 million dollar Bodyline mini-series was originally broadcast on BBC2 Television in 4:3 picture ratio on consecutive evenings at 9.00pm from Monday 3 June – Friday 7 June 1985 and was shown in the significantly longer, original, extended and uncut version. BBC2 divided the series into 5 parts of slightly varying lengths.

The individual original BBC2 episode run-times of the Bodyline mini-series were:

- 3/6/1985: Part 1 – 85 minutes
- 4/6/1985: Part 2 – 89 minutes
- 5/6/1985: Part 3 – 88 minutes
- 6/6/1985: Part 4 – 89 minutes
- 7/6/1985: Part 5 – 85 minutes

Total extended run-time: 436 minutes – 7 hours 16 minutes.

When originally shown on Channel 10 Australia in July 1984 over 4 consecutive nights - including extensive ad-breaks - the run-time was approx. 10 hours. Excluding ad breaks: the actual run-time is 7 hours 16 minutes. IMDb and Amazon give the total run-time of the official extensively cut, re-edited and picture-cropped - from the original 4:3 picture ratio to a 16:9 picture ratio - widescreen presentation DVD version as 330 minutes – 5 hours 30 minutes – 7 episodes of approx. 47 minutes each - a total of 329 minutes.

Therefore, the original version transmitted in its entirety by BBC2 Television in June 1985 is approximately 1 hour 46 minutes longer than the official Australian DVD version of Bodyline. This version was repeated on BBC1 on Friday and Saturday late nights in November 1986, and again on BBC2 on Tuesday lunchtimes over July and August 1991 before transmission rights reverted to Australian TV Network 10 and Kennedy-Miller for DVD production.
