= Alyson Best =

Australian actress

- Born: 29 September 1960 (age 64); Dungog, New South Wales, Australia
- Occupation: Actress

Alyson Best (born 29 September 1960) is an Australian actress known for her appearance in Prisoner (1983) and Man of Flowers (1983). In 1979 she appeared in a famous photo with Derryn Hinch in Playboy.

== Select Credits ==
- Young Ramsay (1980) — episode "Waltzing Matilda"
- Harlequin (1980)
- Pacific Banana (1980)
- Bellamy (1980) (TV series) ‘The Best Damned Killer In The Country’
- Holiday Island (1981) (TV series)
- At Last... Bullamakanka: The Motion Picture (1982)
- Brothers (1982)
- Man of Flowers (1983)
- Prisoner (1983) (TV series)
- Relatives (1985)
- Kindred (1985) (short film)
