= Bastards from the Bush, A Journey with Bob Ellis and Les Murray =

- Directed by: Geoff Burton
- Written by: Bob Ellis
- Starring: Bob Ellis; Les Murray
- Distributed by: ABC
- Release date: 1998
- Running time: 55 mins
- Country: Australia
- Language: English

Bastards from the Bush is a 1998 Australian documentary focusing on the friendship between Australian figures Les Murray and Bob Ellis. It covers a trip the two men take to visit key places growing up together.
