= Michael Boddy =

British-Australian writer and actor (1934–2014)

- Born: 8 March 1934; Baldersby, North Yorkshire England, United Kingdom
- Died: 13 April 2014 (aged 80)
- Education: University of Cambridge
- Occupations: Dramatist, playwright
- Spouses: Margaret Scott, Janet Dawson

Michael Boddy (8 March 1934 – 13 April 2014) was an English-Australian actor and writer. His best known works include co-writing the play The Legend of King O'Malley with Bob Ellis.

== Personal ==
Boddy was born in the village of Baldersby, Yorkshire. His father George Boddy was the local vicar. He studied at Marlborough College and the University of Cambridge; two years of medicine were replaced by studies in natural sciences, classics and literature.

He met his first wife, the poet and writer Margaret Scott, in England, and they migrated to Tasmania in 1959. There he taught at a Hobart high school, while Margaret developed her career as a poet and writer. His second wife, whom he married in 1968 after moving to Sydney in 1965, was the artist Janet Dawson. She won the 1973 Archibald Prize with a portrait of Boddy. Boddy and Dawson moved to Binalong, from where he wrote a regular food column for The Canberra Times.

He died in April 2014, aged 80; he was survived by Janet Dawson Boddy, two children (a third son predeceased him), six grandchildren, two great-grandchildren, and a sister.

== Select credits ==
- John Forrester Awaits the Light (1966) - TV Play
- All Fall Down (1967) - TV play for the ABC
- Intersection (1967) - TV play
- Breakdown (1967) - TV play
- Tilley Landed On Our Shore (1969)
- The Legend of King O'Malley (1970; with Bob Ellis)
- Dead Men Running (1971)
- Hamlet on Ice (1971)
- Biggles (1970)
- Cash
- The Last Supper Show (1972)
- Redheap (1972, TV series)
- Cradle of Hercules (1974)
- Lust for Power (1977)
- Crushed by Desire (1978)
- The Smallest Frog in the World
