= A Very Good Year =

Australian play

- Original language: English
- Written by: Bob Ellis
- Subject: Gough Whitlam
- Genre: comedy with music

Premiere
- Date: December 9, 1980
- Place: Stables Theatre, Sydney
- Directed by: Mick Rodger

A Very Good Year is a 1980 Australian play by Bob Ellis. It was set in the last two weeks of the 1970s and Ellis called it his farewell to "the Whitlam decade".

The play was heavily autobiographical. A reviewer from the Sydney Sun Herald called it "a flop".

== Premise ==
At Palm Beach, a writer (based on Bob Ellis) whose wife and child are away entertains a girl from the public service and is visited by a poet friend (based on Les Murray). A female journalist who aborted her baby to the writer also visits.

According to one account the play "explores some of the preoccupations at the start of the 1980s, including Nostradamus, embassy kidnappings, and the women's movement."

Ellis said "it is set in Palm Beach in those peculiar two weeks last Christmas when bushfires were surrounding Sydney, the sky was dark and apocalyptic, Tito's death seemed to make a Russian invasion of Yugoslavia likely; meanwhile they were really invading Afghanistan, there was the hostage crisis and there were cheerful headlines saying 'Countdown to World War III'. It's quite apocalyptic, and very funny and there are lots of songs."

He also called it "in part a memorial to Whitlam, and in part a threnody to dreams foregone, and in part a look at the technological holocaust that was overwhelming the world."

== Production history ==
The play was produced through the King O'Malley Theatre Company. Ellis later said he was "proud" of the play which he felt "was badly done at the time but which at least still exists on paper."

== Reception ==
H.G. Kippax of the Sydney Morning Herald called it "a very bad play... an evening of almost unrelieve tedium.... It is hardly a play, more a monologue, a sermon in drag... a play without ideas. Its staple is assetion and abuse, in a word whinging. It goes on for nearly three hours, with two intervals."

Harry Robinson from the Sun Herald said Ellis "wrote a mishmash to get off his chest a thousand private jests about herpes, ducks, Wodehouse and Jeeves, Country, Labor and Liberal Parties, children, abortion, mortality, morality, Mal Fraser, Brecht, Gough Whitlam, Catholic faith, Murwillumbah, economics and Francis James... the show... was too long."

The negative critical reception of the production led to Ellis not writing plays for a number of years.

== Original cast ==
- Terry Bader as Ken
- John Clayton as Ted
- Anne Grigg as Julie
- Lorna Lesley as Monica
- Mervyn Drake as pianist
