= Bob Ellis =

Australian writer (1942–2016)

- Born: Robert James Ellis; 10 May 1942; Murwillumbah, New South Wales, Australia
- Died: 3 April 2016 (aged 73); Palm Beach, New South Wales, Australia
- Education: University of Sydney
- Occupations: journalist; screenwriter; playwright; novelist; political commentator
- Political party: Independent; Labor
- Spouse: Anne Brooksbank
- Writing career
- Notable awards: AFI Best Screenplay; 1978 Newsfront; 1982 Goodbye Paradise; 1984 My First Wife

Robert James Ellis (10 May 1942 – 3 April 2016) was an Australian journalist, screenwriter, playwright, filmmaker, and political commentator. He lived in Sydney with author and screenwriter Anne Brooksbank; they had three children.

== Early years ==
Ellis was raised a Seventh-day Adventist. He says the "seminal moment" of his life happened when he was ten and his 22-year-old sister was killed while crossing the road.

He attended Lismore High and then the University of Sydney on a Sir Robert Menzies scholarship, at the same time as other notable Australians including Clive James, Germaine Greer, Les Murray, John Bell, Robert Hughes and Mungo McCallum. After graduating he had a variety of jobs before being employed by the Australian Broadcasting Corporation.

== Writing career ==
Ellis was a regular contributor to the Nation Review in the 1970s and subsequently contributed to Fairfax Media newspapers and The National Times.

Ellis became a popular playwright, usually working in collaboration. In 1970 he and Michael Boddy (1934–2014) co-wrote The Legend of King O'Malley, a musical play based on the life of King O'Malley. From 1975 to 1986 he and Brooksbank also owned the Stables Theatre in Kings Cross, Sydney, during which time it became home to the Griffin Theatre Company. They sold it in 1986 for $200,000.

Ellis wrote several film scripts, often in collaboration with others, notably Newsfront (1978), ...Maybe This Time (1980, with Anne Brooksbank), Fatty Finn (1980) Man of Flowers (1983, with Paul Cox), Goodbye Paradise (1983), Where the Green Ants Dream (Wo die grünen Ameisen träumen) (1984, with Werner Herzog), My First Wife (1984, with Paul Cox), Cactus (1986, with Paul Cox) and The Nostradamus Kid (1992).

In 1980 Ellis signed a contract with the New South Wales Film Corporation to write ten feature film scripts over two years for $7,000 for each script, with a payment of $12,000 for the second draft if they wanted to make the movie. Ellis says he presented them with 33 ideas, they chose five and he chose five.

Ellis also directed several films, including The Nostradamus Kid (1992), Warm Nights on a Slow Moving Train (1988), Unfinished Business (1985) and Run Rabbit, Run (2007).

Ellis's writing for television included the miniseries The True Believers (with co-author Matt Carroll) and Infamous Victory: Ben Chifley's Battle for Coal (2008), with co-author Geoff Burton, made for Film Australia.

== Awards ==
Year	Work	Award	Category	Result
1978	Newsfront	Australian Film Institute Awards	Best Screenplay (with Anne Brooksbank and Phillip Noyce)	Won
1982	Goodbye Paradise	Australian Film Institute Awards	Best Screenplay (with Denny Lawrence)	Won
1984	My First Wife	Australian Film Institute Awards	Best Screenplay (with Paul Cox)	Won

== Politics ==
Ellis, a supporter of the Australian Labor Party, wrote speeches for a number of Labor leaders (such as Bob Carr, Paul Keating and Kim Beazley) and wrote extensively on Labor history.

Regarding Ellis's speech writing, Beazley said on the 7.30 Report that if he had used any of Ellis's speeches he would have been out of politics.

Ellis unsuccessfully contested the Federal seat of Mackellar as an independent candidate against the Liberal Party's Bronwyn Bishop in a by-election in 1994 as the ALP did not field a candidate in that by-election.

Ellis's 2011 book Suddenly, Last Winter – An Election Diary created headlines for its criticism of the Labor Prime Minister, Julia Gillard, and praise for the Liberal Opposition Leader, Tony Abbott. He described Gillard as "not well informed" and "sudden, firm and wrong" in everything she does. He also said "She has no power, no influence, no friends, no learning. There's not much there", while describing Abbott as having "good manners", being "formidable" and possessing a "first-class mind".

Ellis wrote speeches for South Australian Premier Mike Rann for a number of years.

== Death ==
On 18 July 2015, Ellis reported on his blog that he would be attending hospital for what he called "ominous" tests on his liver. The next day he announced "The news is very bad", and that the tests had revealed he had advanced liver cancer with a prognosis that he had months, if not weeks, to live.

Ellis died on 3 April 2016, at his home in Sydney's Northern Beaches.

== Controversy ==
In June 2018, Kate and Rozanna Lilley, daughters of celebrated playwright Dorothy Hewett, alleged that they had engaged in consensual sex at the ages of 15 and 14 with Ellis. Ellis was castigated by feminists including Delaney and Maley.

== Writings ==
Ellis wrote two books, Goodbye Jerusalem and Goodbye Babylon, on his experiences of the Labor Party. The first edition of Goodbye Jerusalem was pulped following a successful defamation case brought by two Liberal cabinet ministers, Tony Abbott and Peter Costello, and their wives. At issue was the single sentence where Ellis quoted politician Rodney Cavalier as having said, "Abbott and Costello...they're both in the Right wing of the Labour [sic] Party till the one woman fucked both of them and married one of them and inducted them into the Young Liberals". The publisher, Random House, accepted that the disputed content was a falsehood and the book was removed from sale. ACT Supreme Court Justice Higgins awarded the two politicians and their wives a total of $277,000 damages. A new edition of the book was published three months later which omitted the defamatory passage.

In 1998 Penguin Books Australia published Ellis's First Abolish the Customer – 202 Arguments Against Economic Rationalism, then Ellis's The Capitalism Delusion – How Global Economics Wrecked Everything and What To Do About It in 2009, One Hundred Days of Summer in 2010, and The Ellis Laws in 2014.

== Bibliography ==
=== Theatre ===
Year	Title	Role	Notes
1970–2001	The Legend of King O'Malley	Co-writer (with Michael Boddy) / lyricist	
1971	Big Brother Dragon	Co-writer (with Michael Boddy)	
1971–1972	Duke of Edinburgh Assassinated or The Vindication of Henry Parkes	Co-writer (with Dick Hall)	
1973	The Francis James Dossier	Playwright / lyricist	Musical about Francis James
1975	Whitlam Days	Writer	
1975–1976	Down Under	Co-writer (with Anne Brooksbank)	Also producer on 1975 Stables Theatre, Sydney production
1980	A Very Good Year	Writer	
1990s	Man, the musical	Book and lyrics (with Denny Lawrence)	
2001	The City of the Plains	Writer	
2004	A Local Man: A Play about Ben Chifley	Co-writer (with Robin McLachlan)	
2012	Shakespeare in Italy	Co-writer (with Denny Lawrence)	
	Intimate Strangers	Co-writer (with Denny Lawrence)	Unproduced

=== Screenplays ===
Year	Title	Role	Notes
1978	Newsfront	Writer (with Anne Brooksbank)	Feature film
1980	Fatty Finn	Writer	Feature film
1980	Maybe This Time	Writer (with Anne Brooksbank)	Feature film
1983	Goodbye Paradise	Writer (with Denny Lawrence)	Feature film
1983	Man of Flowers	Writer (with Paul Cox)	Feature film
1983	The Winds of Jarrah	Writer	Feature film
1984	My First Wife	Writer (with Paul Cox)	Feature film
1985	Unfinished Business	Writer / director	Feature film
1985	Top Kid	Writer (with John Hepworth)	TV series
1985	The Paper Boy	Writer (with John Hepworth)	TV
1986	Cactus	Writer (with Paul Cox)	Feature film
1986	The Gillies Republic	Writer	TV series
1987	Bullseye	Writer	Feature film
1987	Perhaps Love	Writer	TV movie
1988	The True Believers	Writer	Miniseries
1988	Warm Nights on a Slow Moving Train	Writer / director	Feature film
1992	Gillies and Company	Writer	TV series
1993	Dreaming of Lords	Writer (with Ernie Dingo / director	Documentary film
1993	The Nostradamus Kid	Writer / director	Feature film
1994	Ebbtide	Writer	Direct-to-video film
1998	Wildside	Writer	TV series, episode 24
1998	Bastards from the Bush: A Journey with Bob Ellis and Les Murray	Writer	Documentary film
2008	Infamous Victory: Ben Chifley's Battle for Coal	Writer	Documentary

=== Unmade screenplays ===
Year	Title	Role	Notes
1980	The Road to Gundagai	Writer	vehicle for Bert Newton and Gerard Kennedy as soldiers on latrine duty during the bombing of Darwin
	Adaptation of The Sentimental Bloke	Writer	For director Maurice Murphy starring Phillip Quast
c.1980	Unnamed comedy script	Writer	About radio actors in the 1940s
c.1980	Unnamed miniseries	Co-writer (with James Ricketson)	About Bea Miles
c.1980	Unnamed road film	Writer	About two girls going north to audition for a cabaret version of Brigadoon in Surfers Paradise
c.1980	These Remembrances	Writer	Set around the time of the Whitlam Dismissal
	The Girl from Kiev	Writer	About two 40-year-old divorced lawyers travelling near Chernobyl falling for a Russian girl
	Adaptation of Homage to Catalonia	Writer	For director Hugh Hudson, starring Colin Firth and Kevin Spacey
2011	Shakespeare in Italy	Writer	
	Paper Tigers	Writer	Miniseries about the Murdoch family

=== Novels ===
Year	Title	Role	Notes
1976	Mad Dog Morgan	Co-author (with Anne Brooksbank)	Based on the Philippe Mora film Mad Dog Morgan
1980	Fatty Finn	Author	Based on his film script
1985	Top Kid	Co-author (with John Hepworth)	Novelisation of his film script
1985	The Paper Boy	Co-author (with John Hepworth)	Novelisation of his film script
1993	The Hewson Tapes : A Secret History, Perhaps, of Our Times	Author	Fiction presented as the diary of John Hewson
1996	The Season	Co-author with Roy Masters	

=== Non-fiction ===
Year	Title	Role	Notes
	The Things We Did Last Summer: An Election Journal	Author	Account of the 1983 Australian federal election
	Two weeks in another country: a journal of the 1983 British election	Author	Account of the 1983 United Kingdom general election
1987	Letters to the Future	Author	Collection of writings from 1969–1987
1992	The Inessential Ellis	Author	Collection of writings
1997	Goodbye Jerusalem: night thoughts of a Labor outsider	Author	Writings centred on the history of the Australian Labor Party up to the 1996 Australian federal election
1998	First abolish the customer: 202 arguments against economic rationalism	Author	
1999	So it goes: essays, broadcasts, speeches 1987–1999	Author	
2002	Goodbye Babylon: further journeys in time and politics	Author	
2004	Night thoughts in time of war	Author	
2009	And so it went: night thoughts in a year of change (2009)	Author	Events around the 2007 Australian federal election
2009	The capitalism delusion: how global economics wrecked everything and what to do about it	Author	
2010	One hundred days of summer: how we got to where we are	Author	
2010	Suddenly, last winter: an election diary	Author	Diary of the 2010 Australian federal election
2014	The Ellis Laws	Author	

=== Music ===
Year	Title	Role	Notes
1974	Ned Kelly: The Rock Opera	Additional lyrics	Concept album by Patrick Flynn & Reg Livermore

== Acting credits ==
=== Film ===
Year	Title	Role	Type
1983	Man of Flowers	Psychiatrist	Feature film
1985	I Own the Racecourse	Renehan	Feature film

=== Theatre ===
Year	Title	Role	Type
1961	Wet Blankets		St Barnabas Church Hall, Sydney
1995–1996	The Human Behan		Mission Theatre, Newcastle, Bondi Pavilion, Sydney
2000	Waiting for Godot		Bridge Theatre, Sydney
