= The Nostradamus Kid =

- Directed by: Bob Ellis
- Written by: Bob Ellis
- Produced by: Terry Jennings
- Starring: Noah Taylor; Miranda Otto; Alice Garner; Loene Carmen; Lucy Bell; Arthur Dignam; Colin Friels; Claudia Karvan
- Cinematography: Geoff Burton
- Edited by: Henry Dangar
- Music by: Chris Neal
- Distributed by: Beyond (Australia)
- Release date: October 1992
- Running time: 120 minutes
- Country: Australia
- Language: English
- Budget: A$4 million (est.)
- Box office: A$242,800 (Australia)

The Nostradamus Kid is a 1992 Australian feature film written and directed by Bob Ellis.

The film is about the religious and sexual coming of age of a 1950s and 1960s Seventh-day Adventist boy. Ken Elkin (Noah Taylor) is a "randy young man" who is told that the world is about to end. In a race against time, there's only one goal he wants to accomplish—bedding the love of his life, who just happens to be the local pastor's daughter.

It was nominated for two AFI Awards: Best Screenplay, Original & Best Achievement in Costume Design.

== Cast ==
- Noah Taylor as Ken Elkin
- Miranda Otto as Jennie O'Brien
- Alice Garner as Esther Anderson
- Loene Carmen as Meryl
- Lucy Bell as Sarai Anderson
- Arthur Dignam as Pastor Anderson
- Colin Friels as American Preacher
- Claudia Karvan as Beat Girl
- Imogen Annesley as Beat Girl
- Norman Kaye aa Wedding Pastor
- John Noble as General Booth
- Jack Campbell as McAlister
- Philip Brown as Fuzzy Wuzzy
- Bob Maza
- Drew Forsythe as 'General Booth Enters Heaven' Strolling Player
- Kate Fitzpatrick as 'General Booth Enters Heaven' Strolling Player
- Vanessa Downing as 'General Booth Enters Heaven' Strolling Player
- Liddy Clark as 'General Booth Enters Heaven' Strolling Player
- Phillip Scott as 'General Booth Enters Heaven' Strolling Player
- Jonathan Hardy as 'General Booth Enters Heaven' Strolling Player
- Peter Gwynne as Shepherd's Rod

== Production ==
The project had been around for a number of years since David Puttnam suggested Bob Ellis turn his upbringing into a film and hired him to write it in 1979. Ellis:

It was quite an amazing experience, written against his impatience in 11 days in a shed that I rented two houses up, written out of memory and written with a great deal of anguish because I realised what a fool I'd been all my life and I was continuing to be the same kind of fool in the same kind of ways.

It was originally announced that it would be made in the early 1980s with Paul Cox as director, Patric Juillet and Jane Ballantyne as producer, and Robert Menzies and Sarah Walker in the lead roles. Later on John Duigan, Carl Schultz and Chris McGill were attached as directors. Phillip Adams, who was to produce with Puttnam, said "we couldn't raise the dough. It was obliterated during the 10BA rush because it wasn't expensive enough." Ellis then became a director and wanted to make it himself. He eventually succeeded in raising the money through the FFC.

Another actor was originally cast in the lead role but the FFC had reservations and suggested Ellis look further. He ended up casting Noah Taylor. "He was much less the sort of soft wimp that I'd assumed, and it was one of the happiest experiences I've ever had, working with him and those wonderful young actors," says Ellis.

The original cut was 148 minutes but Ellis got it down to 122 minutes. He then reduced it to under two hours, but thought losing those last two minutes hurt the film.

== Reception ==
According to Ozmovies:

The Nostradamus Kid opened to decidedly mixed reviews, with some appreciating the film’s idiosyncratic, eccentric tone - befitting a priapic Seventh-day Adventist fearing the apocalypse - and others finding it a tedious bore with more than dubiously suspect sexual politics.

== Box office ==
The Nostradamus Kid grossed $242,800 at the box office in Australia. Ellis:

It ended up opening in October when all the kids who might have otherwise gone to see it were studying for exams and so on. So it didn't quite break out. It was dogged at every turn by The Piano (1993), which I both detest and resent because it is a conscienceless piece of American betrayal of a story that wasn't very good in the first place.

== Home media ==
The Nostradamus Kid was released on Region 4 PAL DVD by Beyond Home Entertainment in 2010. The DVD includes no extra features.

DVD name	Discs	Region 4 (Australia)	DVD special features
The Nostradamus Kid	1	Yes	None

== See also ==
- Cinema of Australia
