= The Legend of King O'Malley =

Play by Bob Ellis and Michael Boddy

- Original language: English
- Written by: Bob Ellis; Michael Boddy
- Characters: King O'Malley
- Genre: Musical

Premiere
- Date: August 1970
- Place: Jane Street Theatre

The Legend of King O'Malley is a 1970 Australian musical play by Bob Ellis and Michael Boddy about politician King O'Malley.

The original production was held at Jane Street Theatre in Randwick, Sydney, and starred Robyn Nevin and Kate Fitzpatrick. It was directed by John Bell and was heavily revised throughout rehearsals.

It was a big success, commercially and critically, and toured Australia. It has since been much revived. According to Ellis, the play was responsible for helping revive Australian theatre.
