= CBC Bank Building =

CBC Bank Building may refer to:

- CBC Bank Building, Bega
- CBC Bank Building, Berrima
- CBC Bank Building, Campbelltown
- CBC Bank Building, Kiama

== See also ==
- Commercial Banking Company of Sydney
- Commercial Bank of Australia Building (disambiguation)
