= Harbinson =

Harbinson is a surname. Notable people with the surname include:

- Kenneth Harbinson (1906–2000), Irish-born English cricketer
- Lenny Harbinson, Irish Gaelic footballer and manager
- Merv Harbinson (born 1959), Australian rules footballer
- W. A. Harbinson (born 1941), Northern Ireland author
