= John Baxter (author) =

Australian writer, born 1939

- Born: 14 December 1939 (age 86); Randwick, New South Wales, Australia
- Occupation: Novelist
- Writing career
- Genre: Non-fiction

John Baxter (born 14 December 1939 in Randwick, New South Wales) is an Australian writer, journalist, and film-maker.

Baxter has lived in Britain and the United States as well as in his native Sydney. He has lived in Paris since 1989, where he is married to film-maker Marie-Dominique Montel. They have one daughter.

He began writing science fiction in the early 1960s for New Worlds, Science Fantasy and other British magazines. His first novel, though serialised in New Worlds as The God Killers, was published as a book in the US by Ace as The Off-Worlders. He was Visiting Professor at Hollins College in Virginia in 1975-1976. He has written a number of short stories and novels in that genre and a book about science fiction in the movies, as well as editing collections of Australian science fiction.

Baxter has written other works dealing with the movies, including biographies of film personalities, including Federico Fellini, Luis Buñuel, Steven Spielberg, Stanley Kubrick, Woody Allen, George Lucas and Robert De Niro. He has written a number of documentaries, including a survey of the life and work of the painter Fernando Botero. He also co-produced, wrote and presented three television series for the Australian Broadcasting Commission, Filmstruck, First Take and The Cutting Room, and was co-editor of the ABC book programme Books And Writing.

In 1973 Baxter published the first critical account of the work of British film maker Ken Russell, An Appalling Talent. The book was based on an extended interview with the director and covers his work from Amelia and the Angel (1958) to The Boy Friend (1971), while observing the shooting of the film Savage Messiah (1973) and the state of the British film industry.

In the 1960s, he was a member of the WEA Film Study Group with such notable people as Ian Klava, Frank Moorhouse, Michael Thornhill, John Flaus and Ken Quinnell. From July 1965 to December 1967 the WEA Film Study Group published the cinema journal FILM DIGEST. This journal was edited by John Baxter.

For a number of years in the sixties, he was active in the Sydney Film Festival, and during the 1980s served in a consulting capacity on a number of film-funding bodies, as well as writing film criticism for The Australian and other periodicals. Some of his books have been translated into various languages, including Japanese and Chinese.

Since moving to Paris, he has written four books of autobiography, A Pound of Paper: Confessions of a Book Addict, We'll Always Have Paris: Sex and Love in the City of Light, Immoveable feast : a Paris Christmas, and The Most Beautiful Walk in the World : a Pedestrian in Paris.

Since 2007, he has been co-director of the annual Paris Writers Workshop.

== Publications ==
=== Novels ===
- The Black Yacht (1982)
- Scorched (about spontaneous human combustion) as "James Blackstone", pseudonym of Baxter and John Brosnan
- Bidding (1981)
- The Bidders (1980)
- The Hermes Fall (1978) about a possible collision of the 69230 Hermes asteroid and the earth
- The Off-Worlders (1966) about a planet where superstition rules

=== Edited collections ===
- The Second Pacific Book of Australian Science Fiction (1971)
- The Pacific Book of Australian Science Fiction (1968)

=== Nonfiction ===
- Of Love and Paris: Historic, Romantic and Obsessive Liaisons (2023)
- A Year in Paris (2019)
- Montmartre: Paris's Village of Art and Sin (2017)
- The Perfect Meal: In Search of the Lost Tastes of France (2013)
- Eating Eternity: Food, Art, and Literature in France (2017)
- Saint-Germain-des-Prés: Paris's Rebel Quarter (2016)
- French Riviera and Its Artists: Art, Literature, Love, and Life on Cote d'Azur (2015)
- Five Nights in Paris: After Dark in the City of Light (2015)
- The Golden Moments of Paris: A Guide to the Paris of the 1920s (2014)
- Paris at the End of the World: The City of Light During the Great War, 1914-1918 (2014)
- The Inner Man: The Life of J. G. Ballard (2011)
- Chronicles of Old Paris: Exploring the Historic City of Light (2011)
- The Most Beautiful Walk in the World: a Pedestrian in Paris (2011)
- Cooking for Claudine (2011)
- Immoveable feast: A Paris Christmas (2008)
- We'll Always Have Paris: Sex and Love in the City of Light (2006)
- A Pound of Paper: Confessions of a Book Addict (2002)
- The Fire Came by: The Riddle of the Great Siberian Explosion (1976)

==== Film books ====
- George Lucas: A Biography (2016)
- Von Sternberg (2010)
- De Niro: A Biography (2002)
- Mythmaker: The Life and Work of George Lucas (1999)
- Woody Allen: A Biography (1998)
- Buñuel (1998)
- Stanley Kubrick: A Biography (1997)
- Filmstruck: Australia at the Movies. (1988)
- The Hollywood Exiles (1976)
- King Vidor (1976)
- Stunt: The Story of the Great Movie Stuntmen (1974)
- Sixty Years of Hollywood (1973)
- An Appalling Talent: Ken Russell (1973)
- Hollywood in the Sixties (1972)
- The Cinema of Josef von Sternberg (1971)
- The Australian Cinema (1970)
- Science Fiction in the Cinema (1970)
- Hollywood in the Thirties (1968)

== Filmography ==
- The Time Guardian (1987)
