= The City's Edge =

- Directed by: Ken Quinnell
- Written by: Ken Quinnell; Bob Merritt
- Based on: novel The Running Man by W. A. Harbinson
- Produced by: Pom Oliver; Errol Sullivan
- Starring: Tommy Lewis; Hugo Weaving; Katrina Foster; Mark Lee
- Music by: Chris Neal
- Production company: CB Films Production
- Release date: 1983
- Running time: 86 minutes
- Country: Australia
- Language: English

The City's Edge is a 1983 Australian film co-written by Aboriginal Australian writer Bob Merritt.

== Plot ==
Andy comes to Sydney and falls in love with the sister of a heroin addict.

== Cast ==
- Tommy Lewis
- Hugo Weaving as Andy White
- Katrina Foster
- Mark Lee as Jim Wentworth
- Tom E. Lewis as Jack Collins
- Joanne Samuel as Prostitute 1

== Production ==
The film was originally entitled Running Man and was never released theatrically in Australia although it was in the UK.

Merritt later claimed he preferred to "write off" the experience but says it gave him the track record to make Short Changed (1985).
