= TAFE NSW =

Australian vocational education and training provider

- Type: Technical and further education
- Established: 1 March 1833
- Affiliations: TAFE NSW Hunter and Central Coast; TAFE NSW Illawarra; TAFE NSW New England; TAFE NSW North Coast; TAFE NSW Northern Sydney; TAFE NSW Riverina; TAFE NSW South Western Sydney; TAFE NSW Sydney Metro; TAFE NSW Western NSW; TAFE NSW Western Sydney
- Students: 400,000+
- Location: New South Wales, Australia
- Website: www.tafensw.edu.au

TAFE NSW is an Australian vocational education and training provider. Annually, the network trains over 500,000 students in campus, workplace, online, or distance education methods of education. It was established as an independent statutory body under the TAFE Commission Act 1990. The Minister for Regional Development, Skills and Small Business is responsible for TAFE NSW.

TAFE NSW awards qualifications as specified in the Australian Qualifications Framework (AQF), and accredited to the Vocational Education and training (VET). Diploma and Advanced Diploma qualifications awarded may be attributed as partial credit towards bachelor's degree-level studies in some universities.

== History ==
TAFE NSW has existed for over 180 years aiming to upskill the workforce of New South Wales. Demand for vocational education suffered during the early years of the Depression until a decision to expand training services was made to help decrease high unemployment rates by the mid 1930s. Growth also occurred in the industry after World War I and World War II in response to the need to support Australia's war effort. It also played a part in transitioning the population back into civilian work post war.

The establishment of the Technical and Further Education Commission (TAFEC) alongside Commonwealth funding was a key historic moment – Technical Education then became known as TAFE and was established as its own educational body. Local education needs were then met by the regionalisation of community colleges to allow its expansion across the state.

=== 2012–2015: financial and attendance issues ===
Between 2012 and 2016 attendance at TAFE NSW campuses dropped by 83,000 students. In the same period, fees had increased substantially. In a bid to curb this reduction in attendance, 2016 fees were frozen at their 2015 level.

In September 2015, a leaked document revealed the State government intended to close 27 sites in order to reduce costs and raise funds.

On Thursday 16 June 2016, the NSW Government announced that the EBS4 student management system for TAFE would be scrapped. NSW Skills Minister, John Barilaro directed TAFE NSW to develop a new system in time for the 2018 peak enrolment period. The EBS4 rollout for TAFE NSW resulted in extensive major problems with enrolments, inability to track student financial data and generate testamurs, and a project budget over run of approximately $100m.

== Geographical areas ==
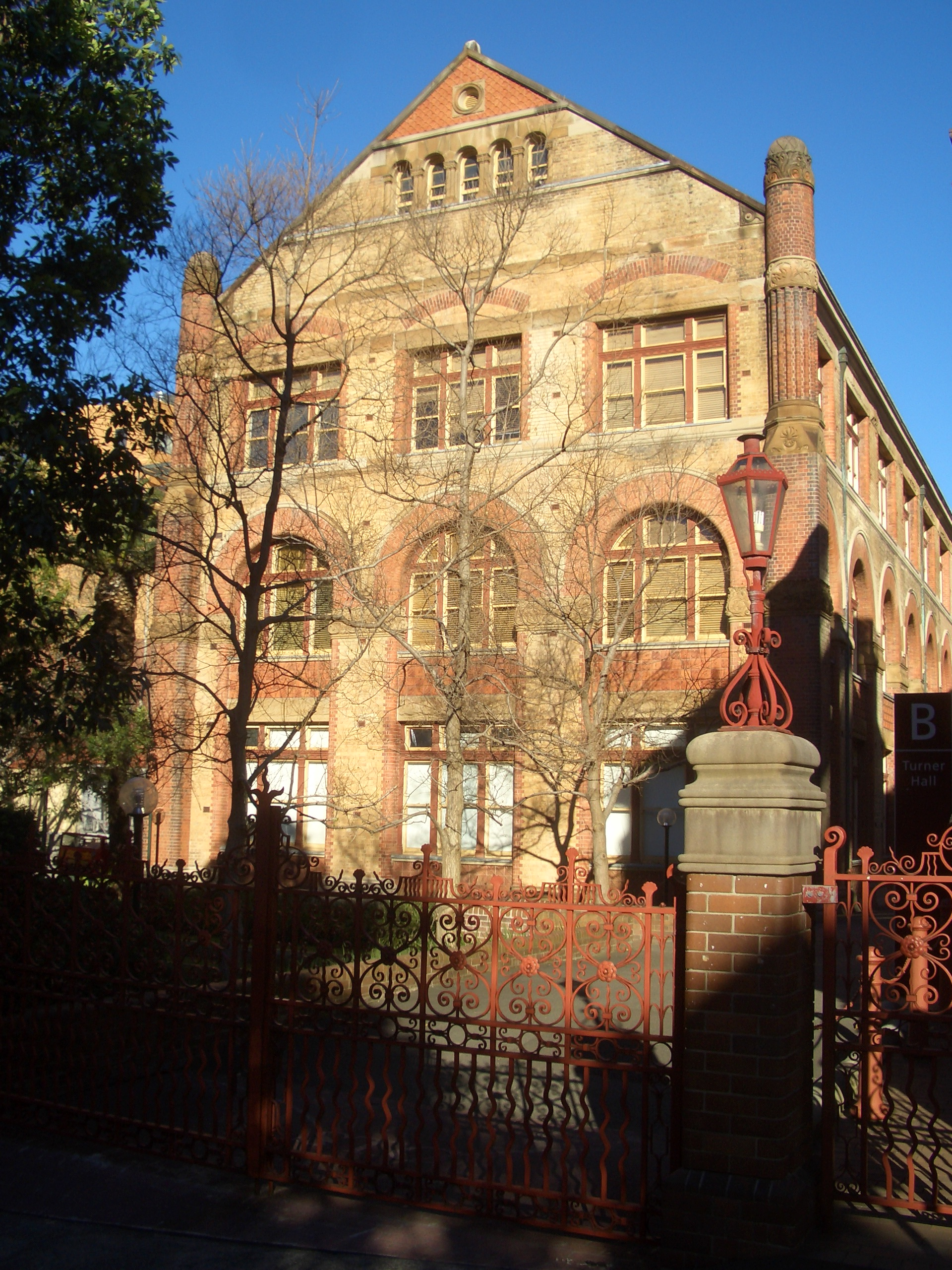
Sydney Ultimo campus

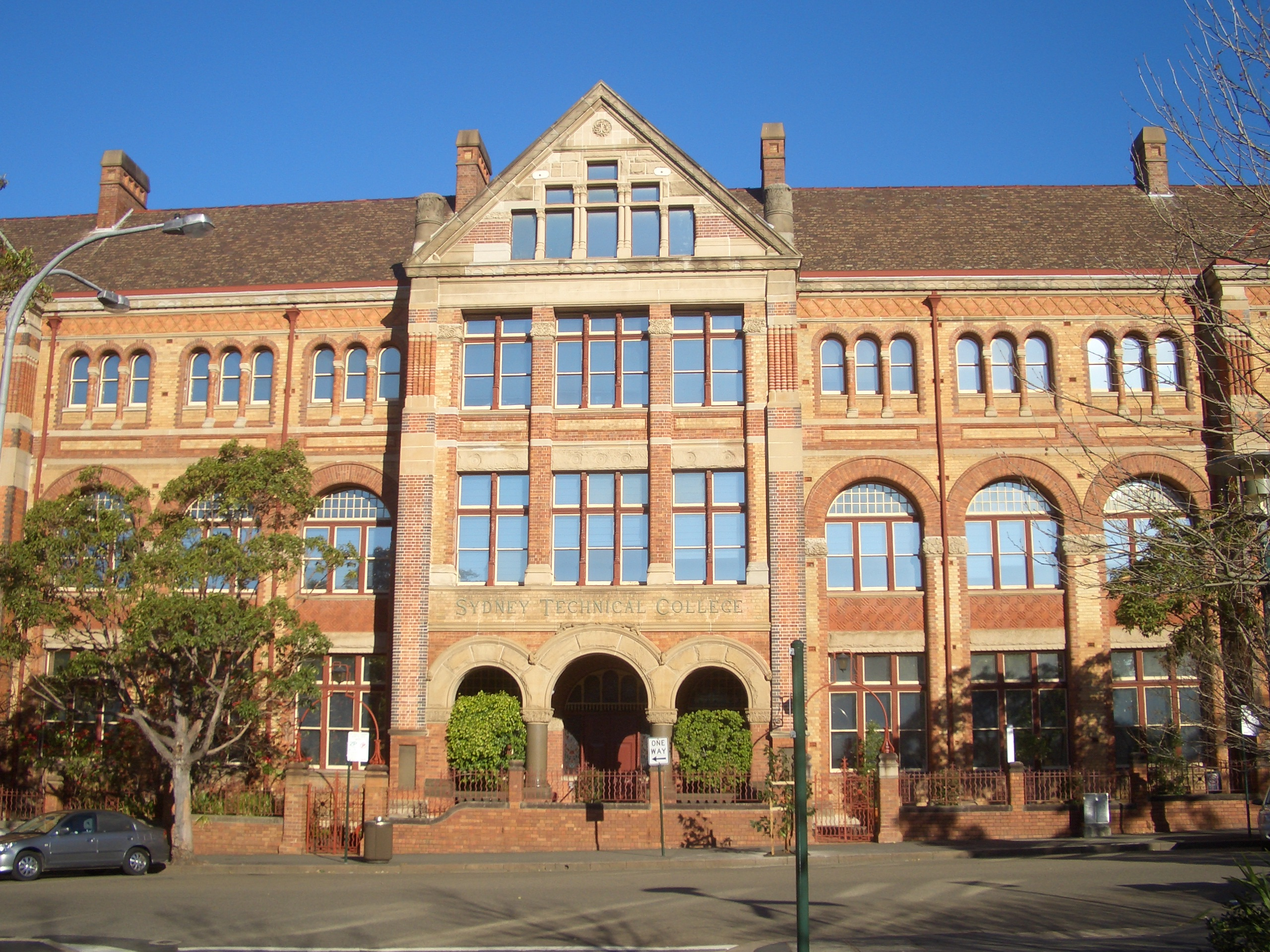
Sydney Ultimo campus

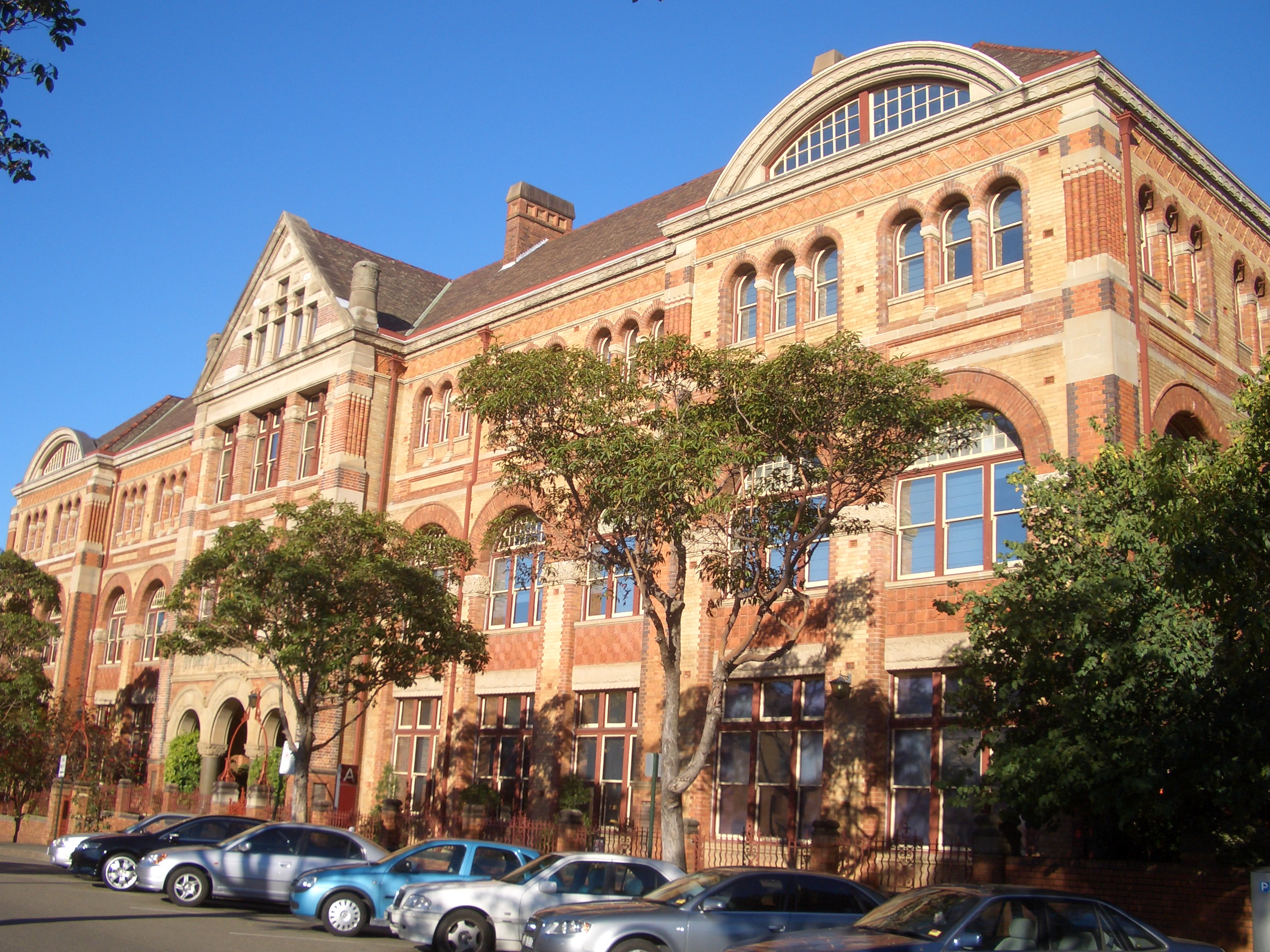
Sydney Ultimo campus

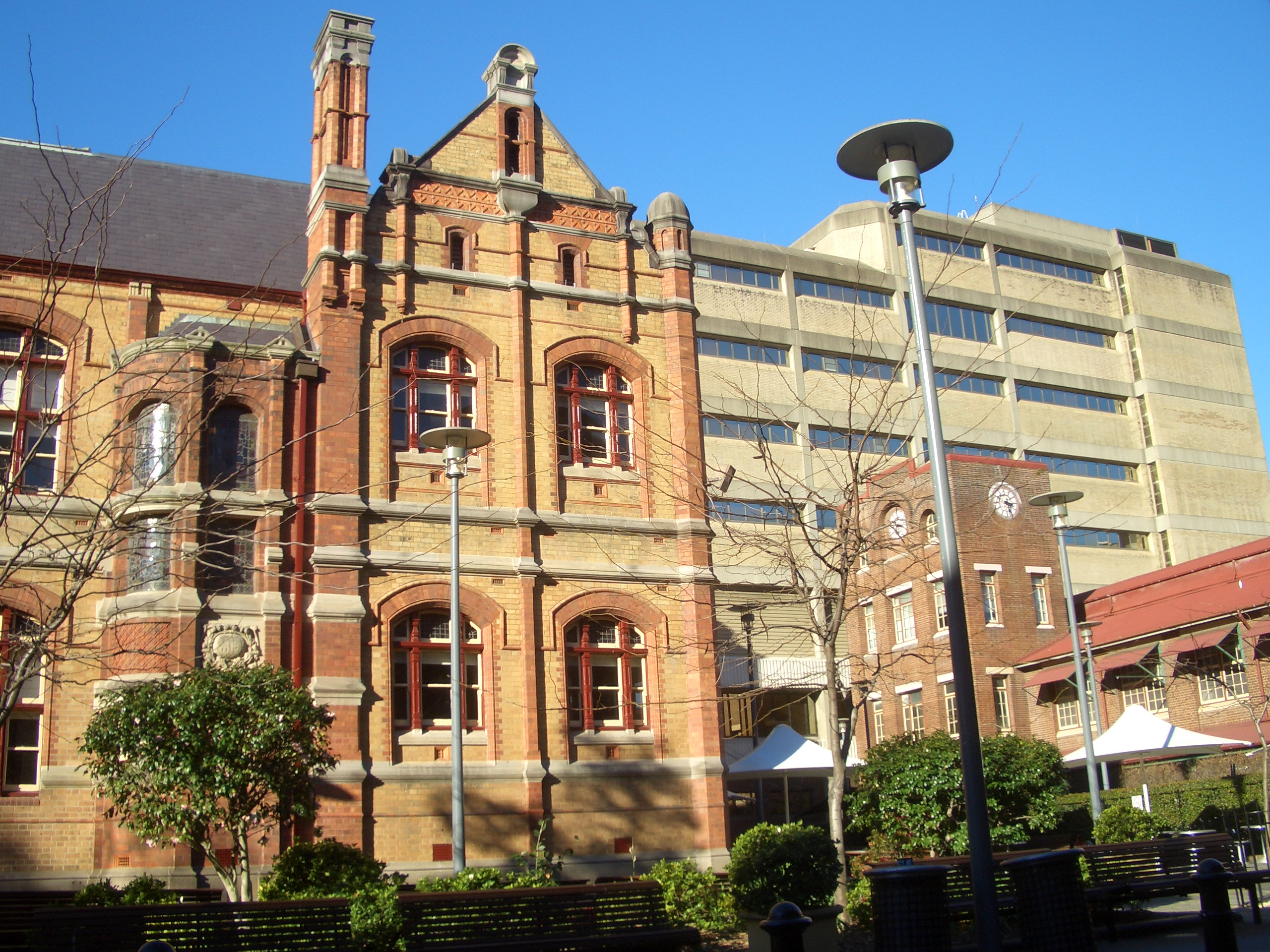
Sydney Ultimo campus

TAFE NSW comprises 130 campuses grouped by geographic area into ten Institutes:

- TAFE NSW Hunter and Central Coast
- TAFE NSW Illawarra (including Karoona Gallery)
- TAFE NSW New England
- TAFE NSW North Coast
- TAFE NSW Northern Sydney
- TAFE NSW Riverina
- TAFE NSW South Western Sydney
- TAFE NSW Sydney Metro
- TAFE NSW Western Sydney
- TAFE NSW Western NSW

All TAFE NSW Institutes were united as one "TAFE NSW" registered training organisation from 1 January 2019. TAFE Digital is TAFE NSW's online offering.

== Campuses ==
Each region has a main campus, e.g. Newcastle Campus is the main campus of the Hunter and Central Coast. In addition to campuses, TAFE NSW provides specialised study spaces and facilities such as Hair Beauty Academy or the Hunter Valley Hotel Academy.

TAFE NSW's online platforms have previously been named OTEN, TAFEnow and TAFE Online. Now known as TAFE Digital, it is Australia's largest online education provider. It offers 250 industry courses across different industries.

TAFE NSW offers skills training for companies. Some of the training areas include leadership and management, business and administration, customer service, HR training, ICT, marketing and communications, and compliance.

=== Eora ===
TAFE NSW Eora, formerly the Eora Centre for the Visual and Performing Arts and then Eora College, is a campus of NSW Sydney Metro at Darlington. located on Abercrombie Street. It has been a centre for contemporary visual and performing arts and Aboriginal studies since it was established in July 1984 on Regent Street, Chippendale by Aboriginal playwright and screenwriter Bob Merritt. Merritt's purpose was to provide training in the arts for Aboriginal students, as an alternative to NIDA and the Australian Film and Television School. He was supported in this by NSW Education Minister Rodney Cavalier and TAFE NSW, so the centre was able to offer an accredited three-year course. Another of Merritt's goals was to provide an antidote to the despair he observed among Aboriginal young people living in Redfern, "by engendering a renaissance of Aboriginal culture". As well as Merritt himself, established Aboriginal actors, writers and directors such as Bob Maza and Brian Syron, as well as non-Indigenous theatre professionals like George Ogilvie were appointed to the teaching staff. Prominent singer Jimmy Little worked at the centre in the 1980s.

Merritt was consultant producer on a documentary film about the centre, Eora Corroboree (1985), the first in a series of documentaries called Black Futures, with David Gulpilil contributing to the soundtrack. The film earned an AWGIE nomination. The cast of Merritt's feature film Short Changed, made in 1985 and released in 1986, included EORA students.

By 1986, Eora was a highly successful college, with more than 200 applicants vying for 70 places each year. It offered two streams: in the visual arts, there were classes in painting, photography, ceramics, and pottery, while dance and acting were taught in the performing arts stream .

In 1989, funding was cut by the New South Wales Government, along with a directive to teach only guitar, and not didgeridoos and clapsticks.

In 1993, lecturers from Eora travelled to 25 locations to offer a two-day course about Aboriginal culture to NSW Police, intended to improve relations between the police and Aboriginal people.

Past students include artist Harry Wedge, dancer Lillian Crombie, actor Trisha Morton-Thomas, singer/songwriter Emma Donovan, photographer Mervyn Bishop, and artist r e a.

=== Meadowbank TAFE ===
Meadowbank TAFE is one of the largest TAFE locations in Sydney. It is home to one of only two Cisco training centres in the Australasia Pacific region, offering degrees in network security and finance. Its courses include subjects such as hairdressing, beauty, and massage. As of 2023 it is being developed as part of the Meadowbank Education and Employment Precinct.

== Courses ==
Course offering vary each year, and across each institution. Some courses are available in different study formats, such as full-time, part-time, or online and distance learning.

AQF compliant qualifications awarded, include:

- Higher School Certificate
- Certificate I
- Certificate II
- Certificate III
- Certificate IV
- Diploma
- Advanced Diploma
- Associate Degree
- Bachelor's degree
- Graduate Certificate
- Graduate Diploma

TAFE also offers some non-AQF compliant qualifications, including:

- Statement of Attainment
- TAFE Plus Statement
- TAFE Statement
- Compliance Certificates

=== TAFE Vocational Education and Training ===
The aim of the TAFE NSW delivered Vocational Education and Training (TVET) qualification is to allow high school students to be more prepared for work, while still being at high school. TVET courses are considered ‘dual accredited’, which means they count as units of study towards both a Higher School Certificate (HSC), and a TVET qualification. All TVET subjects contribute towards a student's HSC units, and have the same unit value as other HSC elective subjects. Some subjects may also contribute to a student's Australian Tertiary Admission Rank (ATAR) for a university admission.

=== University pathways ===
There are some university pathways available to those seeking higher qualifications of professional education. TAFE courses are typically offered as training in specific job skills, as opposed to formal academic education (as is the focus of universities), as such many TAFE courses carry no credit transfers and universities will often prefer ATAR to TAFE qualifications.

== International students ==
TAFE NSW offers work-related training courses, intensive English programs, and 300 approved and accredited courses for international students.

An International Student Coordinator is assigned to each international student. The coordinator's duty includes meeting with them when they arrive at their designated campus, assisting with their orientation program, answering questions about their units, and helping them access support services.

== Facilities, support and services ==
The institution provides students access to their libraries and other facilities, which include individual, group study and social spaces, access to computers, and photocopy and printing. Online libraries are also available to students 24/7.

There are over 30,000 Aboriginal and Torres Strait Islander students enrolled at TAFE NSW. The institution offers financial help to eligible Aboriginal students who live or work throughout New South Wales, or live in identified border postcodes. This includes scholarships, and financial help with travel, accommodation and meals. If eligible, Aboriginal students may be able to receive government financial help through ABSTUDY from Centrelink. To support Aboriginal students, Aboriginal support officers are available to help with enrolment, course selection, study support and employment opportunities.

TAFE NSW enrols a number of students with a disability, offering a range of support services. This includes counselling, helping students choose the right courses for them, identifying support and assessment modifications, and access to services such as disability assistants, adaptive technologies, and sign-language interpreters.

Students who are parents or caregivers have the opportunity to put their children in childcare facilities, which are provided at some TAFE NSW locations. If places are available, children can be enrolled as early as six weeks old up until they are five years of age.

TAFE NSW offers personal and vocational counselling that is free and confidential. Students are able to discuss any study or personal matters with a counsellor. When seeking advice on course and career choices, students are able to get assistance on job opportunities, CV writing, applications, and interview skills.

TAFE NSW provides multicultural services to students with Culturally and Linguistically Diverse (CALD) backgrounds. This includes learning support for students from non-English speaking backgrounds enrolled in mainstream vocational courses, and advice on Temporary Visa Holders (TVH) for enrolling students.

TAFE NSW is home to active student associations in the Central Coast, Illawarra, New England, North coast, Northern Sydney, Sydney and Western Sydney. These associations provide facilities and services for members, including social and cultural activities and events. They are furthermore non-political, and not-for-profit.

Funded by the Australian Government Department of Education and Training, TAFE NSW offers the Adult Migrant English Program (AMEP), providing students up to 510 hours of free English lessons and childcare to newly arrived eligible migrants, and refugees.

The institution offers the Skills for Education and Employment (SEE) program, an Australian government initiative. The program aims to improve reading, writing and maths.

== Centres of Excellence ==
TAFE NSW is home to many Centres of Excellence. As of 2017 these facilities included:

- Aeroskills Centre
- Allied Timber Trades Centre
- Australian Patisserie Academy
- Centre for Digital Media and Design
- Centre for Inland Engineering
- Children's Services Centre
- Cisco Academy Training Centre
- Design Centre Enmore
- Design Centre Hunter
- Engineering Services
- Equine Studies Centre
- Fashion Design Studio (FDS)
- Floor Covering Centre
- Forest Industry Training Centre
- Glass and Glazing Centre
- Grafton Music Centre
- Hair and Beauty Academy
- Health Services Building
- High Performance Sports Hub
- Hunter Valley Hotel Academy
- Illawarra Mechanical Engineering Centre
- Information and Communication Technology Centres
- Macarthur Building Industry Skills Centre
- Mining Skills Centre
- Nepean Health Precinct
- Newcastle Animation, Games & Film School
- Newcastle Art School
- Newcastle English Language Centre
- Newcastle Hair & Beauty Academy
- Newcastle Maritime Training Centre
- Northern Beaches Community Health and Fitness Centre
- Nursing Unit, Gunnedah
- Polymer Processing Centre
- Regional Institute of Performing Arts
- Stonemasonry Centre
- Sydney Health Precinct
- Sydney Language Centre
- Sydney Maritime Simulator
- Sydney Media Centre
- Sydney Wine and Coffee Academy
- The Sydney Academy of Hair, Beauty and Make-up
- TwentyTwenty Training Restaurant
- Yallah Centre of Sustainability

== See also ==
- Mechanics' institutes of Australia
- Technical and Further Education
