= Between Wars =

- DVD cover
- Directed by: Michael Thornhill
- Written by: Frank Moorhouse
- Produced by: Michael Thornhill
- Starring: Corin Redgrave
- Cinematography: Russell Boyd
- Edited by: Max Lemon
- Music by: Adrian Ford
- Production companies: Edgecliff Films; McElroy and McElroy; T and M Films
- Distributed by: Vincent Library; Umbrella Entertainment
- Release date: 15 November 1974
- Running time: 101 minutes
- Country: Australia
- Language: English
- Budget: A$320,000

Between Wars is an Australian 1974 drama/war film released on 15 November 1974. It was directed by Michael Thornhill and written by Frank Moorhouse.

== Plot ==
The film examines four periods in the life of (the fictitious) doctor Edward Trenbow:

- In 1918 Trenbow is treating shell-shocked soldiers from the front.
- In the 1920s he works as a psychiatrist at the Sydney insane asylum and becomes involved in experiments in Freudian psychiatry, which bring him to the attention of a Royal Commission.
- In the 1930s he works as a doctor in a small country town and becomes involved in a fight against the New Guard.
- In 1939 he is working in Sydney as a psychiatrist and tries to defend a German psychiatrist who is being interned as a member of the Australia First Movement. He has become a pacifist and is dismayed when his son enlists for what became World War II.

== Cast ==
- Corin Redgrave as Dr Edward Trenbow
- Judy Morris as Deborah Trenbow
- Gunter Meisner as Dr Karl Schneider
- Arthur Dignam as Dr Peter Avante
- Patricia Leehy as Marguerite
- Jone Winchester as Deborah's mother
- Brian James as Deborah's father
- Reg Gillam as Trenbow's father
- Betty Lucas as Trenbow's mother
- Peter Cummins
- Neil Fitzpatrick as Lance Backhouse
- Reg Gorman as Orderly
- John O'May as William Faulkner
- Judy Lynne as Woman Officer
- Colette Mann as student in revue

== Production ==
Director Michael Thornhill was good friends with writer Frank Moorhouse and they had worked together on several short films. Moorehouse wrote the script in 1970, originally for television and it was revived a few years later. Half the budget came from the Australian Film Development Corporation and the other half from a property developer.

Filming took place over six weeks in February and March 1974 with interiors at the former studios of Cinesound Productions at Bondi and locations in Gulgong and Melbourne. It was the first feature from cinematographer Russell Boyd.

== Release ==
Thornhill decided to distribute the film himself at first. Initial reviews were good but the box office performance was not strong and distribution was taken over by the Vincent Library. The movie did not return its cost; a bigger "flop" than The Cars that Ate Paris.

== Reception ==
The Canberra Times critic considered this an important Australian film, as distinct from the "pot-boilers" of the time — the "Australian New Wave" — Petersen, Stork, Stone and even Wake in Fright.

== Home media ==
Between Wars was released on DVD by Umbrella Entertainment in January 2011. The DVD is compatible with all region codes. By 2023 it was no longer in their catalogue.

== Awards ==
In 1976, the Australian Cinematographers Society awarded the film's cinematographer Russell Boyd with Cinematographer of the Year award for the film.

== See also ==
- Cinema of Australia
