= Karoona Gallery =

Gallery in West Wollongong, Australia

Karoona Gallery is located in the West Wollongong campus of Illawarra Institute of TAFE.

The Gallery space is utilized by art students, teachers, and community groups to show various artistic works throughout the teaching year, contributing to the Wollongong art scene. It is also a valuable teaching space for students to develop skills related to displaying their art works.
