= R e a (artist) =

Australian artist (born 1962)

The artist known as r e a (born 1962) is an Aboriginal Australian artist, also known as r e a Saunders, sometimes written Rea Saunders. As of 2019 r e a is a lecturer within the Aboriginal & Torres Strait Islander Unit at the University of Queensland.

The foundation of their work began in photography, digital media, sound and installation art. Today r e a works in a research-led interdisciplinary, experimental digital arts practice.

== Early life ==
r e a was born in Coonabarabran, New South Wales, in 1962. They are of the Gamilaraay and Wailwan people from the Central West region of NSW, and Biripi people, from the Mid North Coast. r e a's family moved to Sydney in 1968.

== Education ==
r e a initially studied a TAFE course in Electrical Trades at Petersham, New South Wales in 1989, and then started to move towards art a year later enrolled to studying Creative Arts at the Eora Centre in Darlington, New South Wales.

r e a has received a Bachelor of Fine Arts (Visual Arts) from the University of New South Wales in 1993, a Masters of Visual Arts at the Australian National University, a Masters of Science, Digital Imaging and Design, New York University & a PhD in Visual Anthropology, from the UNSW Art & Design, University of New South Wales, in 2019.

== Career ==
=== Exhibition ===
r e a started to exhibit work in 1990 at the Eora Centre, then in 1992, in their second year undergraduate at CoFA, University of New South Wales. r e a's first digital work: Look Who's Calling The Kettle Black was made in 1992, followed by new works in 1993 at the Performance Space and Boomalli Aboriginal Artists Cooperative in Sydney.

In 1994 their work was exhibited in Localities of Desire: Contemporary Art in an International World, Don’t Leave Me This Way: Art in the Age of AIDS, Blackness: Blak City Culture! and True Colours: Aboriginal and Torres Strait Islander Artists Raise the Flag.

In 1995 r e a's first solo exhibition was titled Ripped Into Pieces: Blak Body, at Performance Space.

in 1997, at the Boomalli Aboriginal Artists' Co-op they had a solo exhibition as a part of the 1997 Festival of the Dreaming: a celebration of the art and culture of Indigenous peoples from around the world called EYE/I'MMABLAKPIECE. The installation art exhibited aimed to challenge the male gaze through the use of mirrors.

in 1998 r e a exhibited work in bLAK bABE(z) & kWEER kAT(z) with Brook Andrew.

=== Work ===
Their Collection Look Who's Calling The Kettle Black is a collection of photographic print in three colours.
