= WEA Film Study Group =

The WEA Sydney Film Society is a nonprofit film society based in Sydney, Australia. It is a club of WEA Sydney, which is part of the Workers' Educational Association .

== History ==
It was established as WEA Film Study Group in 1961. The society had its first meeting on 23 February 1961. Ken Quinnell was present at the first meeting. The first president was Ian Klava, Pat Roos was the first secretary. Sid Gore was on the first committee.

As well as being a founder of the WEA Film Study Group, Ian Klava had memberships of a number of film societies including Sydney University Film Group, Sydney Film Society, the All Nations Club Film Group, the Sydney Cinema Society, and the Catholic Film Society. He also worked for the Department of Information film Unit and was Director of Sydney Film Festival from 1962 to 1965.

In the first twelve months of its operation the WEA Film Study Group had presented such films as "Kameradschaft", "The Sentimental Bloke", "Animal Farm", "The Last Laugh", "The Titan" and "Berlin Olympic Games".

The society held some film weekends, both residential at Newport and non-residential film weekends. These included an Eisenstein Weekend held in October, 1963 with one of the speakers being filmmaker Gil Brealey. Another residential film weekend was "Men with guns: an examination of gangster and western films", held at Newport, on 26–28 February 1965 with speakers, Ian McPherson and John Flaus. On the Anzac Day Weekend in 1966, the society held a film weekend at Newport with the theme: "Myth and Reality".

On 3 and 4 December 1966, the society held a non-residential film weekend on D. W. Griffith, with such features as Way Down East (1920), Orphans of The Storm (1922), and Isn't Life Wonderful (1924) being shown. John Morris, film director at the Australian Commonwealth Film Unit gave a lecture at the film weekend.

Occasionally the WEA Film Study Group and the Sydney University Film Group have combined to present film screenings. These have included The Siege of Pinchgut (1959), in July 1965, presented at Margaret St., Sydney. After they moved to Clarence St. Sydney, they also presented a weekend "Signs and Meaning in the Cinema" season, based on the famous cinema book by Peter Wollen, in September and October 1969. In April 1970 they presented at weekend of Silent Comedy. The last time the two societies combined in screenings was 1973.

From July 1965 to December 1967 the WEA Film Study Group published the cinema journal FILM DIGEST. This journal was edited by John Baxter

Notable screenwriters, filmmakers and film critics such as Frank Moorhouse, Michael Thornhill, Ken Quinnell, John Baxter and John Flaus have been members of the WEA Film Study Group.

Since April 1978 the WEA Film Study Group has published the Monthly Bulletin to provide film notes and film news to its members. In 1999 it changed its name to WEA Sydney Film Society.

Notable Committee members include Ian Klava, John Flaus, Denis Trimas, Doug Roberts, Tom Politis, and Leth Maitland.

== Activities ==
It screens a double-feature program each Sunday at noon and on occasional Saturdays. There are about 48 programs a year. There is a short recess after Christmas and during the Sydney Film Festival. The group usually do not screen on public holidays or during public holiday weekends. The Society's screening room is located on the ground floor of the WEA Centre at 72 Bathurst Street, Sydney.

Films including animation and avant-garde programs came from Australia, the USA, Great Britain, Ireland, Canada, France, Germany, Italy, the former USSR, Egypt and India. Silent films projected at appropriate speed, with well-chosen accompaniment continue to be popular. Art-house films as well as wide-screen blockbusters such as 55 Days at Peking have been featured.

Most of the films screened by the society are selected from the more than 6,000 titles held by the National Film and Video Lending Service, owned and managed by National Film and Sound Archive – the National Film and Sound Archive.

Many significant films can only be seen in Australia by members of the general public if they belong to a film society. A number of the titles available on 16mm film for the film society screenings are not currently available on pay or free-to-air television, videocassette or Region 4 DVD. WEA Sydney Film Society is a member of the Federation of NSW and Associated Film Societies and the Australian Council of Film Societies.

== Publications ==
The society has produced journals other publications. These include film notes for the Newport Film Weekend "Men with guns : an examination of gangster and western films" (1965) by Ian McPherson and John Flaus and the monographs "French film noir" (1978) by Tom Politis and "Stanley Hawes, documentary film-maker" (1980) by Valda Lyle, Tom Politis, and Ross Stell.

== Fiftieth anniversary ==
The society had its first meeting on 23 February 1961. They celebrated the fiftieth anniversary of its founding by screening two films on 27 February 2011. These films were Z Channel: A Magnificent Obsession (2004) and Overlord (1975).

== Bibliography ==
- Anne Coombs (1996). Sex and anarchy : the life and death of the Sydney Push. Ringwood, Vic. : Viking. ISBN 0-670-87069-2.
- Darryl Dymock (2001). A Special and Distinctive Role in Adult Education. Sydney: Allen & Unwin. ISBN 1-86508-567-7.
- J. Barrett Hodsdon (2001). Straight roads and crossed lines : the quest for film culture in Australia from the 1960s?. Shenton Park, W.A. : Bernt Porridge Group. ISBN 0-95792-100-4.
- David Stratton (1980). The last new wave : the Australian film revival. Sydney: Angus & Robertson. ISBN 0-207-14146-0.
- Farmer, Monique. "Cinema society". Sydney Morning Herald Metro 19 November 1993 p. 2
- Monthly bulletin ISSN 0158-3069
