= Hoodwink (1981 film) =

- Promotional poster
- Directed by: Claude Whatham
- Screenplay by: Ken Quinnell
- Produced by: Pamela M Oliver; Errol Sullivan
- Starring: John Hargreaves; Judy Davis; Dennis Miller
- Cinematography: Dean Semler
- Edited by: Nicholas Beauman
- Music by: Cameron Allan
- Release date: 5 November 1981
- Running time: 89 minutes
- Country: Australia
- Language: English
- Budget: AU $950,000

Hoodwink is a 1981 Australian thriller film directed by Claude Whatham and written by Ken Quinnell. It stars John Hargreaves and Judy Davis with Geoffrey Rush in his feature film debut. The film is based on the true story of a well-publicised Australian con artist. It was nominated for eight Australian Film Institute Awards, with Davis winning the Award for Best Actress in a Supporting Role.

== Plot ==
Martin Stang, a bank robber (Hargreaves) finds himself behind bars and decides to pursue another con job; his escape. He does this by attempting to convince prison authorities that he is blind and no longer poses a threat to society. Along his journey he befriends a sexually repressed clergyman's wife, Sarah (Davis). The pair become intimate during Martin's day release but his con is complicated when he reveals to Sarah that he is not in fact blind.

== Cast ==
- John Hargreaves as Martin Stang
- Judy Davis as Sarah
- Dennis Miller as Ralph
- Wendy Hughes as Lucy
- Max Cullen as Buster
- Paul Chubb as Reid
- Wendy Strehlow as Martin's sister
- Ben Gabriel as Martin's father
- Michael Caton as Shapley
- Colin Friels as Robert
- Geoffrey Rush as Detective 1
- Lex Marinos as Detective 2
- John Pear as Eye Specialist
- Dasha Blahova as Eye Specialist's Wife
- Heather Mitchell as Nurse 2
- Les Foxcroft as Baldy

== Production ==
The film is based on the true story of Carl Synnerdahl, a convict who posed as a blind man to get a lighter sentence and had been forced to keep up the deception. He told his story to literary agent Rosemary Cresswell, who was doing some work for the Department of Corrective Services, who in turn told the story to producer Errol Sullivan. Several directors were approached to make the movie but turned it down, including Bruce Beresford, Michael Thornhill, Phillip Noyce and Esben Storm. Eventually British director Claude Whatham was imported, which was highly controversial because the movie was made with funds from the Australian tax payer.

== Release ==
The film was not a large success at the box office. However Carl Synnerdahl was released from prison on Errol Sullivan's bond after serving 21 years in prison and he remarried and had three children.

=== Awards and nominations ===
Australian Film Institute Awards

- Australian Film Institute Award for Best Actress in a Supporting Role – Judy Davis (won)
- Australian Film Institute Award for Best Actor in a Leading Role – John Hargreaves
- Australian Film Institute Award for Best Actor in a Supporting Role – Max Cullen
- Australian Film Institute Award for Best Direction – Claude Whatham
- Australian Film Institute Award for Best Screenplay, Original or Adapted – Ken Quinnell
- Australian Film Institute Award for Best Achievement in Editing – Nicholas Beauman
- Australian Film Institute Award for Best Costume Design – Ross Major
- Australian Film Institute Award for Best Achievement in Sound – Gary Wilkins/Andrew Steuart/Peter Fenton
