= Robert J. Merritt =

Indigenous Australian writer

Bob Merritt
- Born: Robert James Merritt; 1945; Erambie Mission, near Cowra, New South Wales, Australia
- Died: May 2011 (aged 66); Sydney, Australia
- Children: 1

Robert James Merritt (1945 – May 2011), known as Bob Merritt or Bobby Merritt and credited as Robert J. Merritt, was an Aboriginal Australian writer and activist. He is especially known for his play The Cake Man and for founding the Eora Centre for the Visual and Performing Arts.

== Early life, family and education ==
Merritt was born in 1945 into a large Wiradjuri family on Erambie Mission, near Cowra, New South Wales.

He had a son named Robert.

== Career ==
Merritt wrote the play The Cake Man in 1974, when he was serving time for a minor offence in Bathurst Gaol, during the time of the riots in the prison. Julian Meyrick, Professor of Creative Arts at Flinders University, described it as being "about the mission experience for Indigenous Australians, and the indignity, injustice and often outright exploitation that came from being 'protected' by white Australians with little knowledge and less interest in the traditional culture their arrival had near-fatally disrupted", and the style as "a beautifully nuanced realism". The play was first performed at the Black Theatre Arts and Culture Centre in Redfern, Sydney on 12 January 1975, directed by Bob Maza. In 1977, a production directed by George Ogilvie was performed at the Bondi Pavilion Theatre in 1977, making it the first play by an Indigenous Australian person to be presented by professional actors at a mainstream Australian venue. When later performed at the World Theatre Festival in Denver, Colorado, in 1982, it was met with standing ovations. Brian Syron, who took the lead role in the first production, reprised the role for the 1977 staging, while Justine Saunders played the leading female character, Ruby. Saunders again played Ruby in 1982, while Syron was the director. Syron and Merritt formed the Aboriginal Theatre Company with the sole function of producing this play (although there were later attempts by Syron to create a company for Aboriginal performers).

In 1983, Merritt co-wrote a film noir with director Ken Quinnell, entitled The City's Edge, which never had a theatrical release in Australia. However, it was released theatrically in the UK.

In July 1984, Merritt established the Eora Centre for the Visual and Performing Arts in Redfern, with help from Birrippi-Worimi artist Gordon Syron (cousin of Brian Syron), to provide training in the arts for Aboriginal students as an alternative to NIDA and the Australian Film and Television School. He was a consultant producer on a documentary film about the centre, Eora Corroboree (1985), the first in a series of documentaries called Black Futures, with David Gulpilil and his Maningrida dancers contributing to the soundtrack. The film earned an AWGIE nomination and was selected as the official Australian entry in major film festivals in Scottsdale, Arizona, the Paris Film Festival, and the Cinéma du Réel. The Eora Centre continues to operate today as Eora TAFE from a building that the centre relocated to in 1993, in Darlington, bordering Chippendale and Redfern.

The film Short Changed, made in 1985, was based on a script written by him, and the cast included Eora students. The film was directed by George Ogilvie (who was a staff member at Eora and later co-directed Mad Max Beyond Thunderdome). NFSA curators described it as a depiction of "the daily struggle for dignity of a contemporary black man caught between two worlds" and called it "a successful collaboration between an Indigenous writer and a non-Indigenous director". The film had a late cinema release, in November 1986, and was nominated in five categories in the AFI Awards.

He moved away from Redfern, but remained a grassroots activist, using his writing to promote his ideas on how dispossession has affected Aboriginal people, especially city-dwellers. In life and work, he embodied a positive image of Aboriginal people.

== Other roles ==
In 1977, Merritt was working for the Aboriginal Legal Service in Sydney.

In November 1986, he was appointed chairman of the Aboriginal Arts Board, the first Aboriginal person to serve on the Australia Council, and held the role until 1989.

He was chair of the Festival of Pacific Arts in 1988.

== Recognition ==
Director George Ogilvie called Merritt "an extraordinary talent".

In 1986, he won the FAW Patricia Weickhardt Award for an Aboriginal Writer.

Corroboree Eora earned an AWGIE nomination, while Short Changed earned five AFI nominations, one of which was for Merritt's screenplay.

== Later years and death ==
Merritt, who was known to family and friends as Bobby, lived in Erskineville, Sydney, before his death in May 2011 at the age of 66. His funeral service was held at St Mary's Catholic Church in Erskineville on 20 May.

== Filmography ==
- The City's Edge (1983)
- Short Changed (1986)
