= WEA Sydney =

- Former names: Workers' Educational Association (1913–1994)
- Type: Adult education
- Established: 1913
- President: William Steenson
- Director: Tiffany Roos
- Administrative staff: 9 (172 tutors)
- Students: 8,000
- Location: Sydney, New South Wales, Australia; 33°52′26″S 151°12′16″E
- Campus: Urban
- Website: weasydney.com.au

WEA Sydney is an Australian educational institution which began in 1913 as the Workers' Educational Association (WEA), inspired by the British organisation of the same name. It is a democratic and voluntary adult education movement. Its current educational program ranges from humanities, languages and arts, to computer, business and vocational training. It is a member of Community Colleges Australia.

== History ==
Cigarette card featuring coat of arms of Workers' Education Association of Australasia, Sydney 1929

The Workers' Educational Association arrived in Australia in 1913. It had been founded in England in 1903 by Albert Mansbridge as 'An Association to Promote the Higher Education of Working Men'. His experience in the British co-operative movement was that workers wanted political and industrial power, but lacked the knowledge to use it, which could be provided by the universities. Growing demand for adult education in Australia led Peter Board, Director of Education in New South Wales, to establish Evening Continuation Schools in 1911 to provide continuity of education between primary school and employment. As a member of the University of Sydney Senate, Board was concerned about what he saw as a lack of effective outreach by universities, and 1912 he drafted the New South Wales Parliament bill which established evening tutorial classes at the University.

In the same year, Mansbridge wrote to David Stewart, a Scottish-born carpenter who had arrived in Sydney in 1910 and was a delegate to the Labor Council of New South Wales. In 1912 Stewart persuaded the Council to investigate sponsoring a scheme for working-class education. He met Board, who remained a strong supporter of the WEA and tutorial classes, but he found the University unenthusiastic. Mansbridge's visit to Sydney in late 1913, however, provided the catalyst for the establishment of the New South Wales branch of the WEA. Stewart was elected unopposed as general secretary, a post he would hold until his death in 1954.

By the end of World War I the WEA had 80 affiliated organisations, including 38 unions. At the end of its first decade, it had 120 affiliated courses and was the most prominent provider of adult education in Australia. At the time of Stewart's death the organisation served more than 8,000 students, offered 103 courses and 31 study circles across New South Wales, hundreds of lectures, and a summer school complex at Newport.

Despite this initial union support, the WEA in the 1920s was not without its detractors. While the objective of its British counterpart was to educate workers so they could achieve political and industrial power, the WEA under Stewart took what he called an 'open mind', essentially a centrist approach, which did not align with the wishes of some workers and unions. In 1929 an article in the Amalgamated Printing Trades Union Review, while praising Stewart for his 'earnestness and sincerity' objected to his 'open mind' approach arguing that an open mind is 'more often than not an empty mind, and is frequently a disguise for mental cowardice in face of ugly questions'. The article further commented that 'If the W.E.A. be a "workers" educational association, then we have the right to expect partiality for working class ideology.' The Union's members voted not to fund the WEA.

Today, the name Workers Educational Association has become an anachronism, the majority of enrolments being beyond working age (see below) and arguably middle class rather than working class.

The WEA introduced creative writing courses and the WEA Film Study Group in 1961. From 1960 to 1964 it partnered with the Sydney television channel TCN-9 to provide Doorway to Knowledge, which aired four times a week. The Computer Training Centre was initiated in 1989. Reorganization in 1994 saw the WEA in New South Wales split into WEA Sydney, WEA Hunter (Newcastle) and WEA Illawarra (Wollongong). The WEA was forming new relationships, including developing courses with the State Library of New South Wales. Federal Government-sponsored renovations of WEA House were completed in 2010, and in 2013 WEA Sydney celebrated its centenary.

== Campus ==
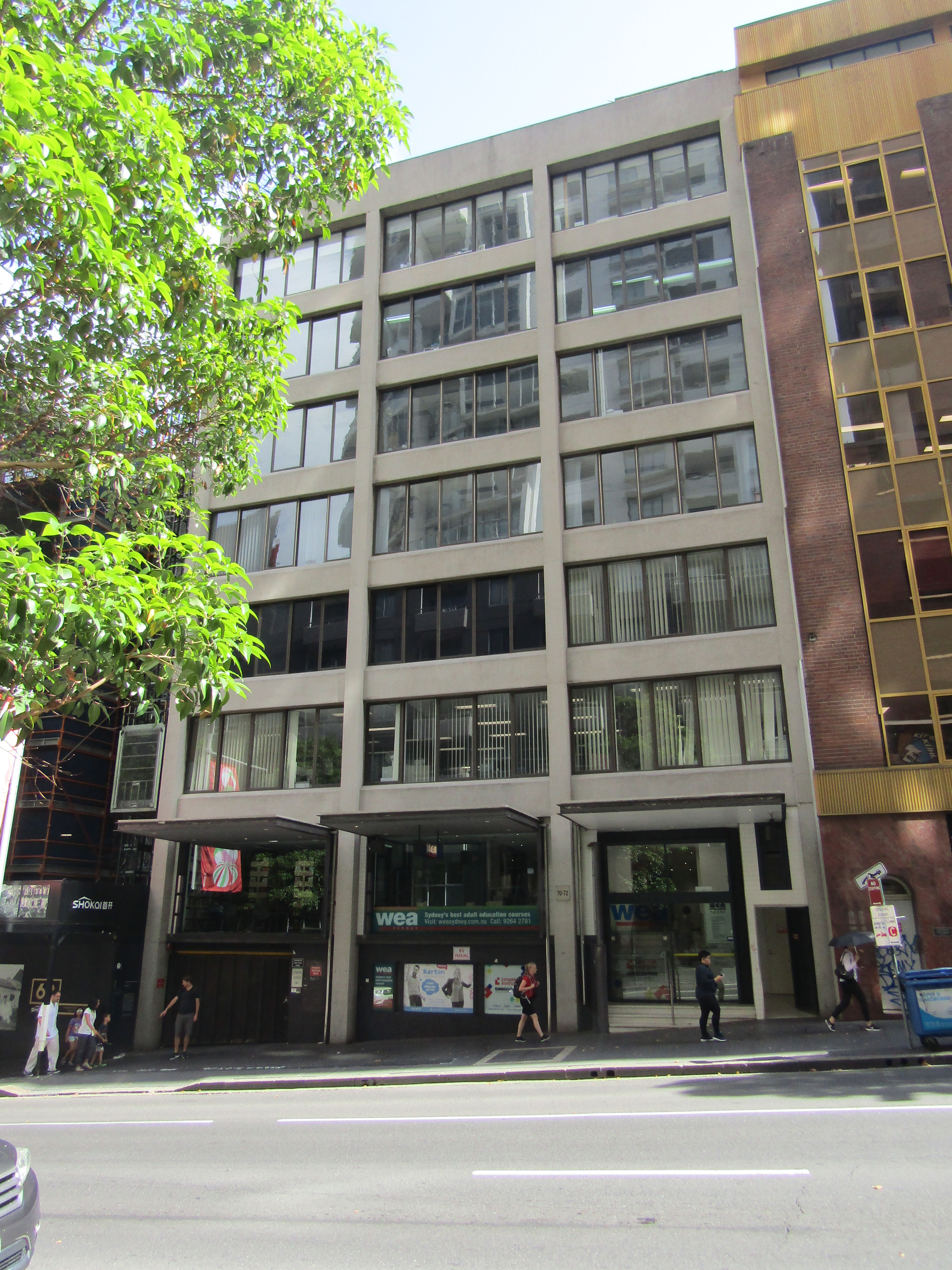
WEA House, Sydney

Most classes are held at WEA House, 72 Bathurst Street, Sydney. It has been WEA Sydney's home since 1971 and remains the Association's major asset and one of its major sources of income. Its location close to Town Hall station and all city bus routes is an important factor in attracting students by day, evening and at weekends. WEA House's facilities for disabled students were enhanced in 2010 with the installation of a small lift for mobility-disadvantaged students at the front entrance. Lonsdale Institute and Barton International College are currently tenants in the building.

=== Classrooms ===
WEA Sydney's teaching spaces include:

- 2 Lecture Rooms
- 1 Art Rooms
- 1 Multi-purpose Music Room
- 10 Classrooms/seminar rooms.

== Governance ==
WEA Sydney is a non-profit company governed democratically by an elected board of honorary office bearers and an executive director (non-voting). The board meets monthly and provides reports to a monthly council meeting which consists of elected volunteer Representatives of Students and Tutors, Representatives of Individual Members of the Association and of Affiliated Organisations, and Life Members. Fee income for 2017 was $1,972,641, with 48% of total fees and 37% of total income coming from language teaching, followed by the contribution of the WEA's core program of Humanities. Total income for 2017 was $2,586,362, with a trading/operating surplus of $166,265. In 2004 the New South Wales Department of Education and Training cut funding for the WEA and other adult and community education providers; it now receives no government funding, with its chief income sources being course fees, property income, and donations.

== Courses and student profile ==
WEA Sydney describes its tutors as 'the life blood of the organisation, both for the quality of the courses that they teach, and as the WEA staff that most students connect with...Most tutors are also heavily involved in their non-WEA careers, either teaching at other institutions, or working within their chosen field.' Its defining Mission Statement stresses the importance of the offering of courses in the Humanities and Social Sciences. Courses are presented in a variety of formats – either short, as in its 'Politics at Lunchtime' talks or one-off weekend seminars, or of standard length (normally between six and ten weekly sessions). There are four terms a year.

WEA Sydney offers courses in the following areas:

=== Humanities and social sciences ===
This is the largest area of provision in terms of enrolment numbers. It covers areas including history, philosophy, science, social sciences, art appreciation, politics, music and literature.

=== Foreign languages ===
Courses are offered in Chinese, Japanese, Ancient Greek, Hebrew, Latin, French, Italian, Portuguese, German, Spanish, Swedish, Arabic, Russian, Indonesian and Welsh.

=== General studies ===
The program includes courses on travel, writing skills, lifestyle and hobbies, healthy living, photography, and the creative and visual arts.

=== IT, gadgets and business ===
Courses are offered in general IT skills (mainly the Microsoft Office package) and Apple and Samsung devices, with specific courses available as special seniors' courses. Business courses include web-based marketing, business communication and leadership techniques.

=== Classes in conjunction with other organisations ===
WEA Sydney offers a number of courses in association with external organisations, including the Australian National Maritime Museum, the Royal Australian Historical Society, Sydney Observatory, Nicholson Museum, and the United Nations Human Rights Committee.

=== Other educational activities ===
WEA Sydney puts together programs to tie in with various special weeks, community events and anniversaries including NAIDOC, Sydney Writers' Festival, Seniors Week, and History Week.

=== Discussion Groups ===
The Discussion Group Program, inherited from the University of Sydney in the early 1990s, is a distance education program providing specially developed study material to small groups spread widely around New South Wales. Students join together in groups to read, analyse, discuss and debate educational material that is mailed to them under the guidance of a corresponding tutor.

WEA Sydney enrolment summary: 2017
	Courses	Enrolments
Humanities	389	7,166
General Studies	238	2,135
Languages	429	4,325
Tours	2	24
Computer skills	115	585
Business, Online & General Training	33	133
Discussion Group Program	72	492
Total	1,278	14,860

WEA Sydney enrolments by Age and Gender: 2017
	Females	Males	Total	Percentage
Under 20 Years	21	9	30	0.2
20–29 Years	178	75	253	1.7
30–39 Years	250	106	356	2.4
40–49 Years	334	142	476	3.2
50–59 Years	1,137	483	1,620	10.9
60–69 Years	3,703	1,572	5,275	35.5
70–79 Years	2,806	1,191	3,997	26.9
Greater than 79	699	297	996	6.7
Not known	1,304	553	1,857	12.5
Total	10,432	4,428	14,860	100

== See also ==
- Adult education
- Community college
- Continuing education
- Lifelong learning
- Vocational education
