= Ken Quinnell =

Australian screenwriter and film director

- Born: 1939 (age 85–86); Sydney, Australia

Ken Quinnell (born 1939) is an Australian screenwriter and film director.

== Journalism ==
Quinell has a background in publishing and freelancejournalism, including working for Screen International and Rolling Stone. In the 1960s he was a member of the WEA Film Study Group, where he met writers Michael Thornhill and Frank Moorhouse.

From 1966 to 1968 Quinnell and Michael Thornhill published SCJ: The Sydney Cinema Journal.

== Film and television ==
Thornhill and Quinnell have worked in the Australian film industry.

Quinnell wrote the screenplays for Cathy's Child (1979) (with Dick Wordley) adapted from Wordley's novel Hoodwink (1981); and The City's Edge (1983), originally titled The Running Man. The City's Edge, which was made for television, was co-written by Robert J. Merritt and W.A. Harbison, adapted from W.A. Harbison's novel. Short Changed (1985) was also co-written by Merritt.

== Awards ==
In 1981 Quinnell was nominated for the Australian Film Institute Award for Best Screenplay, Original or Adapted, for Hoodwink.

== Bibliography ==
- David Stratton (1980). The last new wave : the Australian film revival. Sydney: Angus & Robertson. ISBN 0-207-14146-0.
- Brian McFarlane; Geoff Mayer; Ina Bertrand, eds. (1999). Written at Melbourne, Australia. The Oxford companion to Australian film. New York: Oxford University Press. ISBN 0-19-553797-1.
