= Commercial Banking Company of Sydney =

The Commercial Banking Company of Sydney Limited
- Industry: Banking
- Founded: 1834
- Defunct: 1982
- Fate: Merger with National Bank of Australia
- Successor: National Australia Bank
- Headquarters: Sydney, Australia

The Commercial Banking Company of Sydney Limited, also known as the CBC, or CBC Bank, was a bank based in Sydney, Australia. It was established in 1834, and in 1982 merged with the National Bank of Australasia to form National Australia Bank.

== History ==
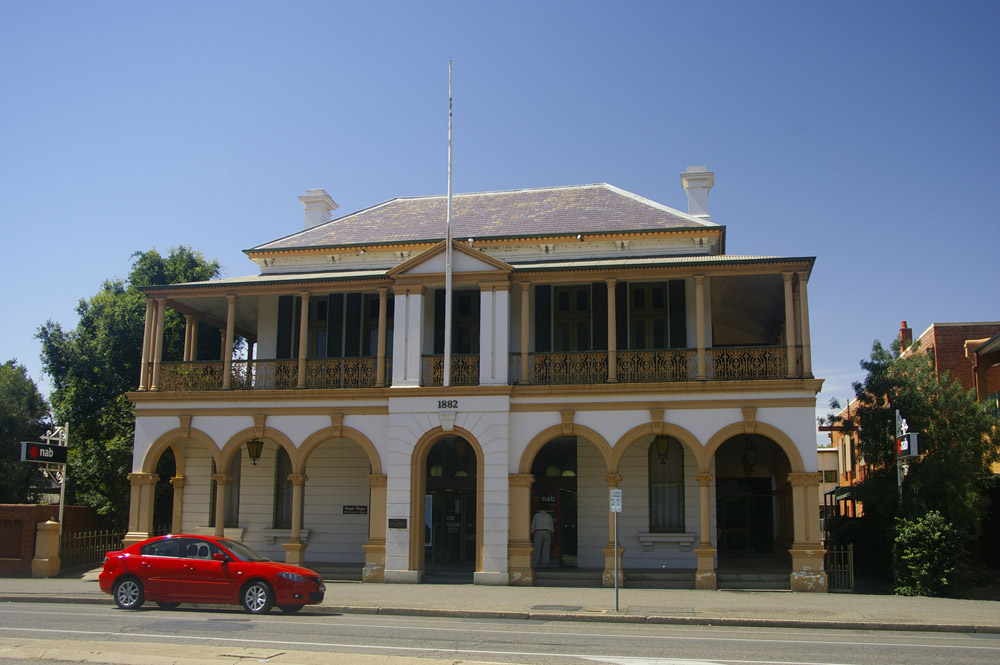
Former CBC Bank in Wagga Wagga, New South Wales

On 8 September 1834 the Sydney Herald carried a notice titled "The Commercial Banking Company of Sydney" proposing the establishment of a new bank. It began operations on 1 November 1834 and in 1848 was incorporated by an act of the New South Wales Parliament. Sir Edward Knox was the first bank manager and later a director. Thomas Barker, a manufacturer, engineer, politician, landowner and philanthropist, was a notable director and chairman. William Rutledge (born 1806 – died 1876 Port Fairy, Victoria, Australia), merchant, banker and early settler, also became a director of the bank in 1839.

The CBC grew to service the expanding pastoral and farming industries of the then Colony of New South Wales.

It absorbed the Bank of Victoria in 1927.

In July 1982, CBC Bank helped to fund a tour of Bob Merritt's play The Cake Man to Denver, Colorado.

In 1982 the bank merged with the National Bank of Australasia to form National Australia Bank.

== Legacy ==
The bank constructed many substantial and ornate buildings as branches throughout Australia. A number of extant buildings are heritage-listed, including:

- Armidale branch office
- Bega branch office
- Berrima branch office
- Campbelltown branch office
- Dubbo branch – first office, Corner of Bultje and Macquarie Streets
- Dubbo branch – second office, 110–114 Macquarie Street
- Kiama branch office
- Moree Plains Gallery now known as Bank Art Museum Moree (BAMM)
