= W. A. Harbinson =

British author (born 1941)

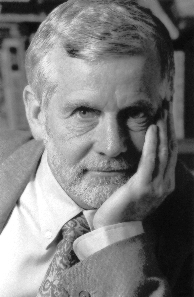
- Born: 1941 (age 84–85); Northern Ireland
- Occupation: Author
- Writing career
- Pen name: Shaun Clarke
- Genres: Science fiction; war novel; nonfiction; biography
- Website: waharbinson.eu.com

William Allen Harbinson (born 1941 in Northern Ireland), who writes under the name W. A. Harbinson, is a British author. He is best known for his Projekt Saucer five-volume series of science fiction novels. He also writes war novels, many with a special forces theme, under the pseudonym Shaun Clarke.

== Biography ==
W. A. Harbinson was born in Belfast, Northern Ireland, in 1941. He went to live in England at age 17, then emigrated to Australia at 19, serving for six years in the Royal Australian Air Force (RAAF). Returning to England, he lived in London for twenty years, spent a few years in Paris, but now lives in West Cork, Ireland.

Harbinson began his literary career with a series of potboiler paperbacks published in Sydney, Australia, between 1967 and 1969. His first serious novel, published when he had left Australia and settled in London, was a World War II story, Instruments of Death (1973; entitled None But the Damned in the US). Being a paperback original, the novel received few reviews, though on the cover of the US edition, bestselling novelist Robin Moore hailed it as "The greatest war novel since Norman Mailer's The Naked and the Dead". This was followed by an avant-garde novel, Knock (1975), described in the foreword by Colin Wilson as a work that "belongs to an Irish tradition that runs from Charles Lever and Samuel Lover, down through Joyce, Beckett and Donleavy".

Harbinson then proceeded to write in a more commercial vein. He is the author of over fifty novels, including his bestselling high-tech/science fiction thriller epics Genesis (1980) and Revelation (1982). The original Genesis was used as the basis for his five-volume "Projekt Saucer" series, which includes, in sequence, Inception, Phoenix (nominated for the Arthur C. Clarke Award in 1995), Genesis, Millennium, and Resurrection, all published in Great Britain by New English Library. Though the series remained in print for most of the 1990s, only volumes 1 (Inception) and 3 (Genesis) were published in the United States. A Spanish-language edition of Genesis was published by Circulo de Lectores in 2004.

Harbinson's decade of UFO research for the "Projekt Saucer" series was used as the basis for his non-fiction book Projeckt UFO: The Case for Man-Made Flying Saucers, published in hardback and paperback by Boxtree, London, in 1996. The book claims to provide conclusive proof that flying saucers are made in Antarctica using Nazi technology and a slave colony of ex-concentration camp inmates.

Harbinson then launched the Bloomsbury Books series of "22 Books" SAS novels, writing twelve books for the series under the pen name of Shaun Clarke; he then went on to a separate, successful career as an SAS thriller writer, producing novels for Hodder Headline and Simon & Schuster.

Harbinson is also the author of various biographical works, including a US number 1, million-selling biography of Elvis Presley, plus biographies of Charles Bronson, George C Scott, Klaus and Nastassja Kinski, and Evita Peron. The latter reached the number 6 position in The Times Top Ten Movie and TV Tie-ins listing of October 1996. It was also published by St. Martin's Press, New York.

In 2005, Harbinson self-published his autobiography, The Writing Game: Recollections of an Occasional Bestselling Author, as a POD book, later as a Kindle e-book, released through Amazon's CreateSpace. This was followed by his travel memoir All at Sea on the Ghost Ship (2005), also released as both a POD book and Kindle e-book. Since then, he has republished most of his best-known works as both POD books and Kindle e-books.

Harbinson's early Australian novel The Running Man was turned into a feature film entitled The City's Edge. His work for radio includes the science fiction play Astronaut, broadcast by the BBC in 1975, and a short story, Father and Son, broadcast by BBC Ulster in 1999.

== Works ==
=== Novels ===
Writing as W. A. Harbinson

Projeckt Saucer series

- Projekt Saucer I: Inception (1991)
- Projekt Saucer II: Phoenix (1995)
- Projekt Saucer III: Genesis (1980)
- Projekt Saucer IV: Millennium (1995)
- Projekt Saucer V: Resurrection (1999)

Other novels

- The Running Man (1969)
- Instruments of Death (1973), (US title: None But the Damned)
- Knock (1975)
- Meat (1975)
- No Limit for Charlie (1977)
- The Oil Heist (1978)
- Strykers Kingdom (1979)
- Deadlines (1981)
- Revelation (1982)
- Otherworld (1984)
- The Light of Eden (1987)
- The Lodestone (1989)
- Dream Maker (1991)
- Departures (1996)
- The Crystal Skulls (1997)
- Eden (1998)
- Into the World of Might Be (2008)
- One Thing to Know (2012)

Writing as Shaun Clarke

- Behind Iraqi Lines: Soldier A SAS (1993)
- Heroes of the South Atlantic: Soldier B SAS (1993)
- Secret War in Arabia: Soldier C SAS (1993)
- Sniper Fire in Belfast: Soldier E SAS (1993)
- Guerrillas in the Jungle: Soldier F SAS (1993)
- The Desert Raiders: Soldier G SAS (1993)
- Counter-Insurgency in Aden: Soldier J SAS (1993)
- The Embassy Siege: Soldier L SAS (1994)
- Night Fighters in France: Soldier P SAS (1994)
- Death on Gibraltar: Soldier R SAS (1994)
- Into Vietnam: Soldier V SAS (1995)
- Terrorism on the North Sea: Marine A SBS (1995)
- The Headhunters of Borneo: Soldier H SAS (1994)
- The Exit Club (1996)
- SBS 3 Blitz Edition (1997)
- Dragon Light (1997)
- Underworld (1997)
- SAS 3-Blitz Edition (1997)
- Red Hand (1998)
- The Opium Road (1998)
- Operation Millennium (1999)
- Green Light (2000)
- Reverse Negative (2000)
- Night Rider (2001)

=== Nonfiction ===
Writing as W. A. Harbinson

- Elvis Presley: An Illustrated Biography (1975)
- The Illustrated Elvis (1976)
- Bronson!: A Biographical Portrait (1976)
- Evita!: A Legend for the Seventies (1977)
- George C.Scott: The Man, the Actor and the Legend (1977)
- The Life and Death of Elvis Presley (1977)
- Growing up with the Memphis Flash (with Kay Wheeler) (1994)
- Projekt UFO: The Case for Man-Made Flying Saucers (1995)
- Evita: Saint or Sinner? (1996)
- The Writing Game: Recollections of an Occasional Bestselling Author (2005)
- All at Sea on the Ghost Ship (2005)
- Beauty and the Beast: The Story of Nastassja and Klaus Kinski (2011)
- Iconic Voices (2011)
