= Kenneth Harbinson =

Irish-born English cricketer

William Kenneth Harbinson (11 July 1906 – 7 November 2000) was an Irish-born English cricketer (born in Larne) who played 14 first-class matches for Cambridge University in the late 1920s.

Harbinson was the first man to score a hundred in each innings of a match for Cambridge. Against Glamorgan at Fenner's in 1929, from number two in the order he struck 130 in the first innings and 109 not out in the second. His unbroken stand of 331 for the second wicket with Tom Killick (200*) remains as of March 2009 Cambridge's highest partnership against Glamorgan for any wicket.
