= Michael Thornhill =

Australian film director (1941–2022)

- Born: 29 March 1941; Sydney, New South Wales, Australia
- Died: 22 January 2022 (aged 80); Annandale, New South Wales, Australia
- Occupations: Film producer; screenwriter; director; film critic

Michael Thornhill (29 March 1941 – 22 January 2022) was a film producer, screenwriter, and director.

== Career ==
Thornhill had a background in freelance journalism and publishing including working as a film critic.

He was a member of the WEA Film Study Group in the 1960s, where he met writers Ken Quinnell and Frank Moorhouse. He wrote film articles on film for the WEA Film Study Group film journal Film Digest from 1965. He and Quinnell published the film journal SCJ: The Sydney Cinema Journal from 1966 to 1968. He was the film critic for the Sydney Morning Herald and The Australian (1969 to 1973). He wrote a screenplay for a film version of The One Day of the Year for producer Anthony Buckley that was never made.

Thornhill had an extensive career in the Australian film industry. He is best known for his films The F.J. Holden (1977) and Between Wars (1974). He worked as a projectionist and film editor before turning to directing short films and documentaries in the late 1960s. Some of his first films were short documentaries made for the Commonwealth Film Unit (now Screen Australia) including The Esperance story (1968) and Cheryl and Kevin (1974).

He has directed many films with screenplays written by Frank Moorhouse including The American Poet's Visit (1969), The Girl from the Family of Man (1970) and The Machine Gun (1971), Between Wars (1974), The Everlasting Secret Family (1988) and the docudrama Who Killed Baby Azaria? (1983). His screenplays include The Esperance story (1968), Cheryl and Kevin (1974), and his feature film The Journalist (1979) . He has been the producer for many of his films including Between Wars (1974), The F.J. Holden (1977), The Ever-Lasting Secret Family (1988) and Who Killed Baby Azaria? (1983). In the late 1970s and early 1980s he was a director of the New South Wales Film Corporation, giving valuable support to films such as Hoodwink (1981). In the mid-1980s he produced several high-rating television programs such as The Great Gold Swindle (1984, executive producer) and Robbery (1985, director and producer).

== Personal ==
Thornhill was born in Sydney on 29 March 1941. He died in St Basil's Aged Care, Annandale on 22 January 2022.

== Awards ==
His film Between Wars (1974) was awarded 1976 Cinematographer of the Year by the Australian Cinematographers Society for the cinematographer Russell Boyd IMDB

== Select filmography ==
Documentary film

- Stainless Glass Screens (1969)
- The Esperance Story (1969)
- Mister Fixit My Dad (1972)
- Kevin and Cheryl (1972)

Short film

- The American Poet's Visit (1969)
- Girl from the Family of Man (1970)
- The Machine Gun (1971)

Feature film

- Between Wars (1974)
- The FJ Holden (1977)
- The Journalist (1979)
- The Everlasting Secret Family (1988)

TV movie

- Harvest of Hate (1978)
- The Disappearance of Azaria Chamberlain (1984)

Producer

- Summer of Secrets (1976)

== Bibliography ==
- David Stratton (1980). The last new wave : the Australian film revival. Sydney: Angus & Robertson. ISBN 0-207-14146-0.
- Brian McFarlane; Geoff Mayer (1999). Ina Bertrand (ed.). The Oxford companion to Australian film. Melbourne, Australia; New York: Oxford University Press. ISBN 0-19-553797-1.
