= CBC Bank Building, Kiama =

CBC Bank
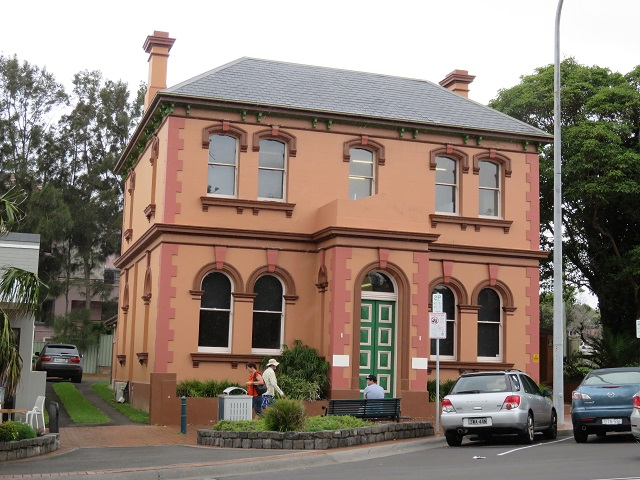

- Location within New South Wales Location within Australia
- 34.6724°S 150.8566°E
- Location: 16–20 Manning Street, Kiama, Municipality of Kiama, New South Wales, Australia

History
- Built: 1880

Site notes
- Architect: Mansfield Bros

New South Wales Heritage Register
- Official name: CBC Bank (former); Kiama Veterinary service; Commercial Banking Company of Sydney Ltd
- Type: state heritage (built)
- Designated: 2 April 1999
- Reference no.: 143
- Type: Bank
- Category: Commercial
- Builders: White and Coghill

CBC Bank is a heritage-listed former bank building at 16–20 Manning Street, Kiama, in the Illawarra region of New South Wales, Australia. It was designed by Mansfield Bros and built by White and Coghill in 1880. It was added to the New South Wales State Heritage Register on 2 April 1999.

== History ==
The building was built in 1880 for the Commercial Banking Company of Sydney, with Mansfield Bros. as the architect and Sydney contractors White and Coghill as builders. It was described at its establishment by The Kiama Independent and Illawarra and Shoalhaven Advertiser as "likely to be one of the principal ornaments of Kiama".

The CBC Bank shifted to new premises in Terralong Street c. 1969.

In 1979 Mr & Mrs Roslyn McKinnon, owners of the CBC Bank, nominated it for a Permanent Conservation Order. At that time the front of the building was occupied by a solicitors practice, the rear was occupied by a veterinary surgeon and the upstairs was let as a flat. The owners of the property were seeking protection under the Heritage Act for the building with a view to attracting rating and taxation benefits.

At its meeting of 14 January 1981 the Heritage Council recommended that a Permanent Conservation Order be placed over the former CBC Bank, Kiama.

A Permanent Conservation Order was placed over the property on 17 July 1981.

It was transferred to the State Heritage Register on 2 April 1999.

It now houses IT firm DropPoint.

== Description ==
The building falls within the Mansfield Genre of substantial and impressive two-storey Italianate-style banks consisting of ground floor banking chambers with first floor manager's residence. Materials are rendered brick and slate, and the building retains much of its original detail and joinery, little compromised by the various uses to which the former bank has been put.

The building retains much of its original detail and joinery.

== Heritage listing ==
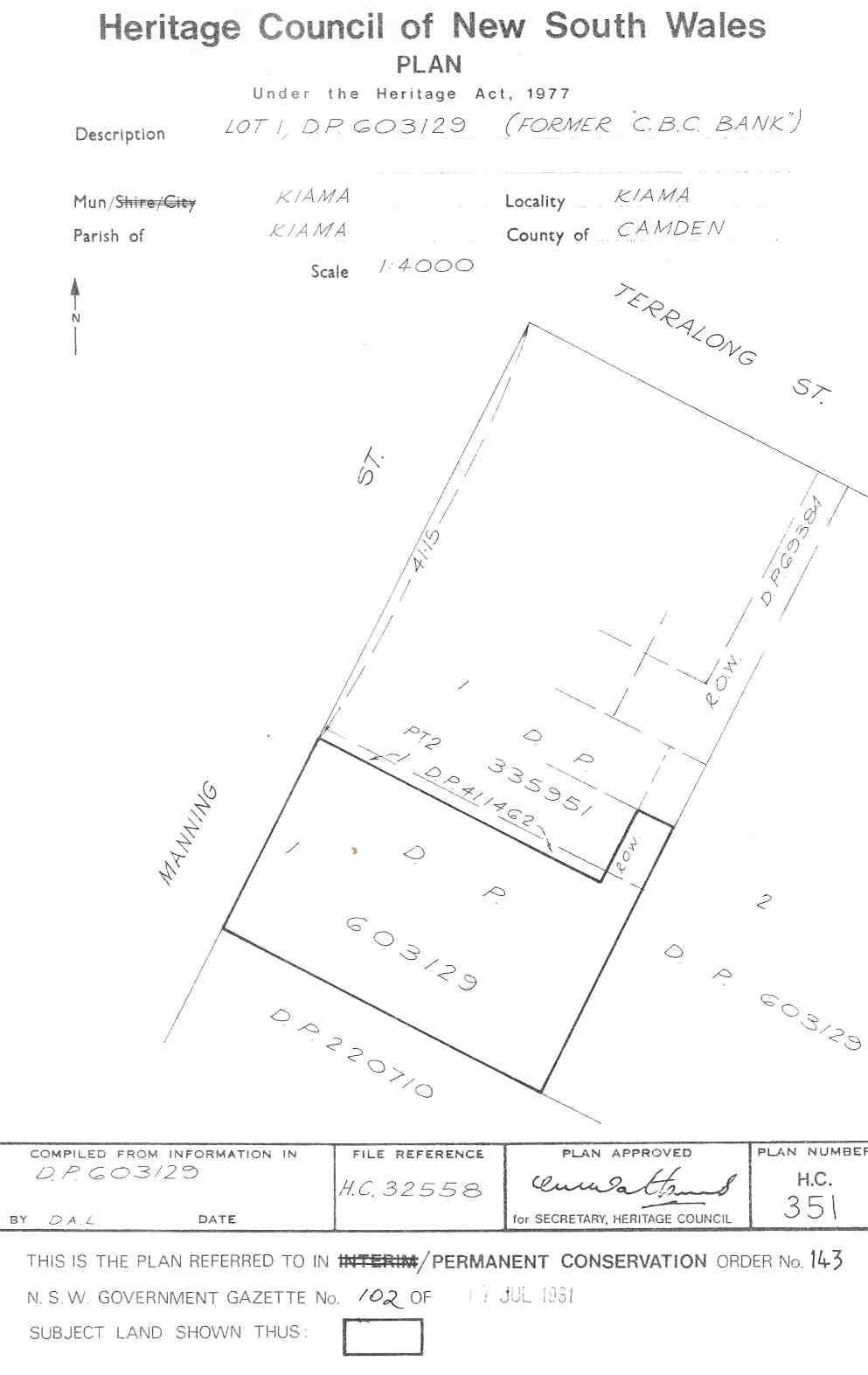
Heritage boundaries

The former CBC Bank was constructed in 1880 to designs of Mansfield Bros for Commercial Banking Company of Sydney Ltd. It comes within the Mansfield genre of substantial and impressive two-storey Italianate style banks. The building retains much of its original detail and joinery. Situated adjacent to the Bank of New South Wales building, also by Mansfield Bros and near Kiama Post Office and other early commercial and civic premises, the former CBC bank is an important component of Kiama's townscape and a reminder of the town's elegant past.

CBC Bank was listed on the New South Wales State Heritage Register on 2 April 1999 having satisfied the following criteria.

The place is important in demonstrating the course, or pattern, of cultural or natural history in New South Wales.

The former CBC Bank was constructed c. 1880 to designs of Mansfield Bros for Commercial Banking Company of Sydney Ltd.

The place is important in demonstrating aesthetic characteristics and/or a high degree of creative or technical achievement in New South Wales.

It comes within the Mansfield genre of substantial two-storey Italianate style banks. Situated adjacent to the Bank of New South Wales building, also by Mansfield Bros and near Kiama Post Office and other early commercial and civic premises, the former CBC bank is an important component of Kiama's townscape and a reminder of the town's elegant past.
