= CBC Bank Building, Bega =

CBC Bank building
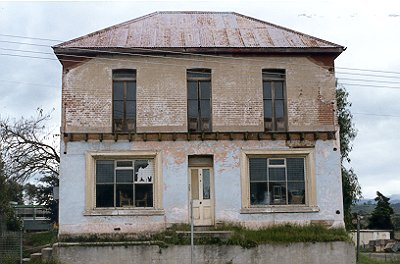

- Location within New South Wales Location within Australia
- 36.6701°S 149.8412°E
- Location: 21 Auckland Street, Bega, Bega Valley Shire, New South Wales, Australia

History
- Built: 1865

Site notes
- Owner: Bega Valley Shire Council

New South Wales Heritage Register
- Official name: CBC Bank (former); CBC Bank
- Type: state heritage (built)
- Designated: 2 April 1999
- Reference no.: 588
- Type: Bank
- Category: Commercial

CBC Bank Building is a heritage-listed former bank building and now residence at 21 Auckland Street, Bega, in the South Coast (New South Wales) region of New South Wales, Australia. It was built from 1865. The property is owned by the Bega Valley Shire Council. It was added to the New South Wales State Heritage Register on 2 April 1999.

== History ==
The building was built by Nicholas Bouquet in 1865 for the Commercial Banking Company of Sydney. It is understand to have been the first bank in Bega, the first two-storey building, and the third building of substance erected in the town. It occupies a commanding position at the top of a bluff on what was once the main road entering the town from the north. The commercial centre of Bega has moved away from this area, and in recent years the building has been used as a residence.

In 1980 the Department of Education requested advice from the Heritage Council concerning the former CBC Bank which is situated within the grounds of Bega Public School.

An Interim Conservation Order was placed over the building 27 September 1985. This order was renewed on 25 September 1987. It was agreed that the order would serve to emphasise the importance of this heritage item to the community of Bega and will ensure its future retention.

In 1987 the care, control and management of the building was transferred to Bega Valley Council.

Through the Heritage Assistance program funding was granted in 1989/1990 for the restoration of the building and reinstatement of the front verandah. A new toilet, basin and trap door were installed in 1990. Further improvements included the painting of the exterior.

== Description ==
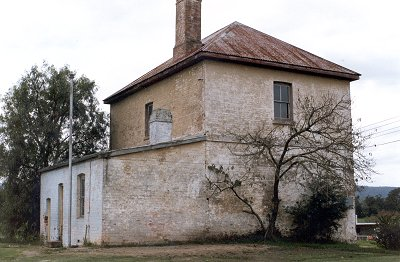
Side and rear view

A two-storey building of simple mid Victorian Colonial design of 3 bays originally having a 2-storey verandah and balcony (now removed). The central entrance door is of 4 panels with fanlight flanked by a large shop window either side containing 6 equal panes of glass surrounding by a deep timber architrave. Symmetrically arranged above a 3 identical pairs of French windows having decorative transoms above.

Construction is of English bond brickwork on coursed rubble bluestone foundation with the upper part of the front façade having tuck pointed Flemish bond brickwork. Windows are generally 4 paned double hung type while the corrugated iron roof is of a simple hipped form with a small skillion at the rear.

The building occupies a commanding position at the top of the bluff on what was once the main road entering the town from the north.

The former CBC Bank is a substantially intact mid colonial commercial building. The physical condition of the building was reported as good as at 3 August 2000.

== Heritage listing ==
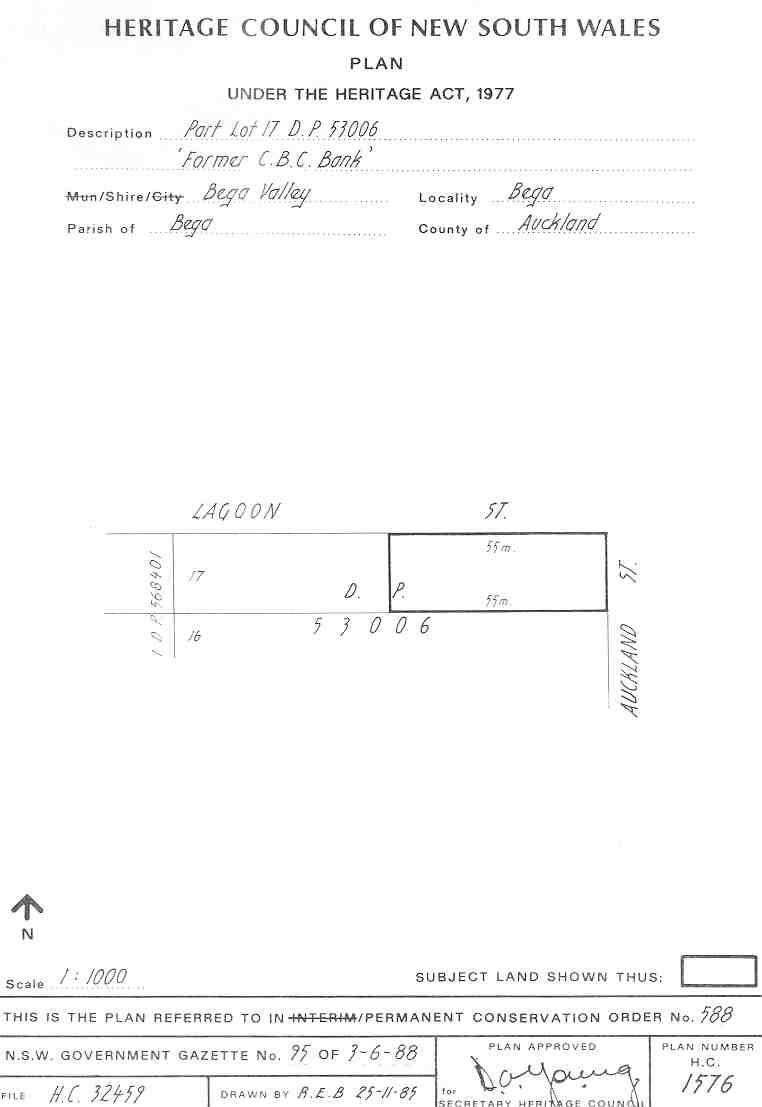
Heritage boundaries

Built in 1865 for the Commercial Banking Company of Sydney it is understood to have been the first bank in Bega, the first two-storey building, and the third building of substance erected in the town. It occupies a commanding position on a bluff on what was once the main road entering the town from the north. It is a simple mid Victorian Colonial style commercial building. It serves to mark the extremity of the original town centre, close to the river. The town centre shifted as the shipping trade along the river moved away to the coast and Tathra. The building is an important reminder of Bega's early commercial development and its subsequent changes.

CBC Bank building was listed on the New South Wales State Heritage Register on 2 April 1999 having satisfied the following criteria.

The place is important in demonstrating the course, or pattern, of cultural or natural history in New South Wales.

Built in 1865 for the Commercial Banking Company of Sydney it is understood to have been the first bank in Bega, the first two-storey building, and the third building of substance erected in the town. It serves to mark the extremity of the original town centre, close to the river. The town centre shifted as the shipping trade along the river moved away to the coast and Tathra. The building is an important reminder of Bega's early commercial development and its subsequent changes.

The place is important in demonstrating aesthetic characteristics and/or a high degree of creative or technical achievement in New South Wales.

It occupies a commanding position on a bluff on what was once the main road entering the town from the north. It is a simple mid Victorian Colonial style commercial building.
