= CBC Bank Building, Campbelltown =

Commercial Banking Company of Sydney, Campbelltown Branch (former)
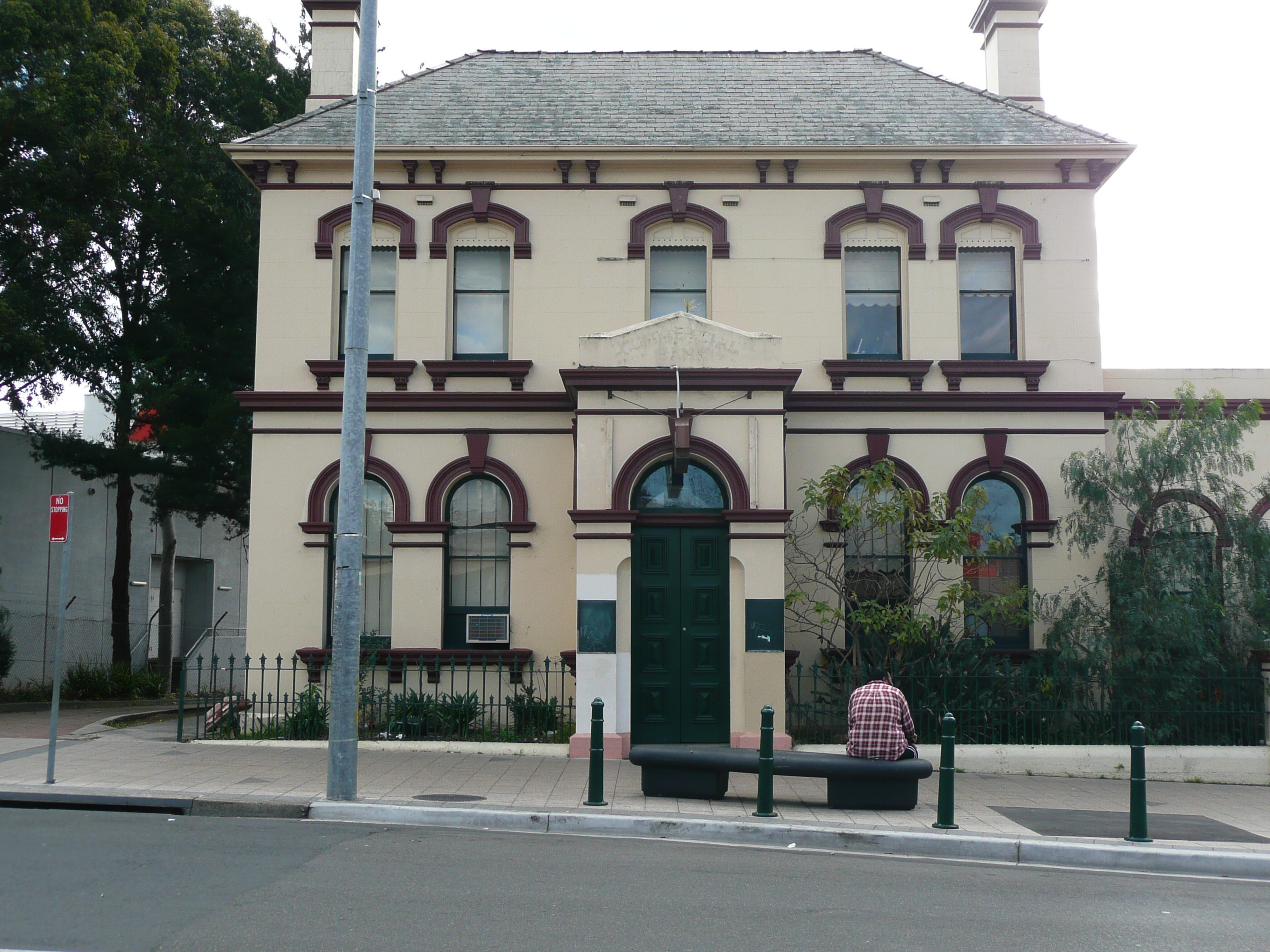
- The former CBC bank building, pictured in 2008

- Location within New South Wales Location within Australia
- 34°04′07″S 150°48′43″E
- Location: 263 Queen Street, Campbelltown, City of Campbelltown, New South Wales, Australia

History
- Built: 1874–1881

Site notes
- Architect: Mansfield Brothers

New South Wales Heritage Register
- Official name: CBC Bank; Old CBC Bank; Commercial Banking Company of Sydney, Campbelltown Branch (former)
- Type: state heritage (built)
- Designated: 2 April 1999
- Reference no.: 499
- Type: Bank
- Category: Commercial

Commercial Banking Company of Sydney (CBC), Campbelltown Branch is a heritage-listed former restaurant, offices and bank building and now medical centre located at 263 Queen Street, Campbelltown, New South Wales, an outer suburb of Sydney, Australia. It was designed by Mansfield Brothers and built from 1874 to 1881. It is also known as Old CBC Bank; CBC Bank. The property is privately owned. It was added to the New South Wales State Heritage Register on 2 April 1999.

== History ==
Permanent European settlement in the Campbelltown area had begun in 1809 as an alternative to the flood-prone Hawkesbury district. Work on a road from Sydney to Liverpool was started in 1811. It was opened in August 1814 and was soon extended further south to Appin. This road, variously known as Campbelltown Road, Appin Road or the Sydney Road, passed through Campbelltown. The section through the town was called the High Street until the last decade of the 19th century when it was renamed Queen Street.

The land on which the Queen Street cottages stand was part of a grant of 57 hectares (140 acres) to Joseph Phelps in 1816. He had been working the land for some years before receiving formal title to it. Phelps was one of the farmers of Airds and Appin who subscribed funds for a Sydney courthouse in July 1813. His grant was seized, possibly as soon as it was formally issued, by the provost marshal, William Gore, in lieu of payment by Phelps of debts totalling £170. The land was auctioned in January 1817 to William Bradbury for £100 plus twelve cattle and the grain produced from the crop growing on the land.

Immediately north of Phelps' grant, Assistant Surveyor James Meehan had informally reserved 71 hectares (175 acres) for a village (AMCG, 1994 say "in 1815".) In 1816 most of the land in the area was granted, leaving a portion of 71 hectares (175 acres) unalienated, and surrounded by several grants.

The reserved land was formally declared a town by Governor Macquarie in December 1820 and named Campbelltown in honour of his wife (Elizabeth)'s family.

William Bradbury (1774–1836) a native of Birmingham, was transported to NSW aboard the Guildford in 1812. His wife Elizabeth remained in England but his daughter, Mary (1797–1852) followed her father to Australia in 1815. Bradbury had no other children in NSW, though he established a relationship with a woman named Alice and in April 1836 married a Campbelltown widow, Catherine Patrick, née Acres (c. 1801–1883). Bradbury died two months later.

Governor Macquarie visited Campbelltown in January 1822. He and his party ate a "hearty" breakfast at 'Bradbury's', indicating that Bradbury had built an inn. This was probably the inn later known as the Royal Oak, on the western side of the High Street. Macquarie noted in his journal that 'Bradbury is building a very good two storey brick house on his own farm and on a very pretty eminence immediately adjoining Campbell-Town as an inn for the accommodation of the public, and having asked me to give his farm a name, I have called it Bradbury Park. In 1826 Bradbury Park House was considered by William Dumaresq, inspector of roads and bridges, as the best building in Campbelltown when he reported on buildings suitable for military use.

As the main street of Campbelltown, High Street or Sydney Road and later Queen Street, was at the edge of town, one side of the street was not within the town boundary while the other was. Canny traders soon realised that either side of the main road was as good as the other and leased or bought land from the grantees bordering the town proper. By the 1840s more than a few shops and hotels occupied the western side of the High Street. The coming of the railway in 1858 also aided in securing the commercial focus of the town on Queen Street.

The Queen Street terraces were identified by Helen Baker (Proudfoot) in the early 1960s as a unique group of two-storey late Georgian vernacular buildings which were considered to form the only surviving late-1840s streetscape within the County of Cumberland. The buildings were acquired by the Cumberland County Council and its successors, the State Planning Authority and Department of Planning, to ensure their preservation.

=== CBC Bank ===
Joseph Phelps was granted 57 hectares (140 acres) adjoining the future site of Campbelltown in 1816. His was one of a group of the first grants made that year. The subject property (the future 263 Queen Street) represents a small portion of the original grant. Phelps did not develop the portion of the grant that is the subject of this study. In fact no plan shows any development before 1881.

Phelps increased his holdings to 69 hectares (170 acres) in 1817, and that year conveyed the larger property to Thomas Clarkson. It passed through several hands up to 1870, however it appears was not developed in any way. It was presumably used for agricultural purposes.

Samuel Parker, blacksmith, bought the subject property as part of a larger parcel in 1870 from Charles Morris. Parker owned the adjoining property (south side) and appears to have worked and resided on the property. What use, if any, he made of the subject site is unclear (Parker's house can be seen to the left of the bank in an 1881–83 photograph).

=== The Commercial Banking Company ===
The Commercial Banking Company (CBC) of Sydney opened its first Campbelltown office in leased premises, McGuannes House at 286 Queen Street (across the road from no. 263) in 1874, with George L. Jones as manager. McGuannes House is separately listed on the State Heritage Register. It is owned by the Department of Environment & Planning and is at present leased as a doctor's surgery. AMCG (1994, 14) states that CBC bought the property (263 Queen Street) from Samuel Parker (not Morris) in 1876 and had the present building built in 1881. AMCG states that the bank's first permanent manager from 1874 was A. J. Gore, who served until he retired in 1904.

The bank moved into its own premises at 263 Queen Street in 1881. This building (built between 1874 and 1881) was designed by the Mansfield Brothers who were important Victorian architects employed by the CBC Bank on a number of projects designing many bank chambers, examples surviving in many country towns. It is a fine and restrained Italianate style rendered and painted building symmetrically designed about a small portico.

The bank sold a portion of the land it bought from Parker in 1880. The land was purchased in the name of the Queen for a new post office. That building was completed the same year as the CBC chambers.

In 1959 the bank sold off another portion of its 1876 purchase to the Commonwealth of Australia, presumably for the creation of a telephone exchange.

The banking chamber has been altered, but it is understood that the building still contains a stone domed vault, and the original staircase and other joinery. There is a large yard behind the bank which contains a stable/ coach house, now used as a garage.

The CBC sold the bank cahmbers and property at 263 Queen Street in 1986, moving to new premises (as the National Australia Bank). In recent times the former bank building at 263 Queen Street has been leased by a Pancake restaurant and is today (1994) used as the offices for a local newspaper.

== Description ==
Site

There is a large yard behind the bank which contains an 1874 stable/coach house, now used as a garage.

Bank

A fine and restrained Victorian Italianate style rendered and painted building symmetrically designed about a small portico. The banking chamber has been altered, but it is understood that the building still contains a stone domed vault, and the original staircase and other joinery.

C-shaped building around a courtyard.

It includes a stone-domed bank vault.

=== Condition ===
As at 8 July 2008, the banking chamber has been altered, but it is understood that the building still contains a stone domed vault, and the original staircase and other joinery. There is a large yard behind the bank which contains a stable/coach house, now used as a garage.

=== Modifications and dates ===
- 1950s – extension on the north side to the rear, alteration with parapet walls to the existing string course level and fenestration in keeping with the old building's style.
- 1960s – newer commercial building built to the rear of the site – there is no physical connection between the buildings.
- 1985 – The banking chamber has been altered (original bank fittings removed), but it is understood that the building still contains a stone domed vault, and the original staircase and other joinery. There is a large yard behind the bank which contains a stable/coach house, now used as a garage.
- 1985 – approval for internal modifications being removal of some existing walls, reuse of existing cedar joinery with additions to match, restoration of a magnificent plaster ceiling, over the former banking chamber.
- 1992 – major redevelopment in the former rear yard. 1874 Stables/coach house was demolished after being archivally recorded.

== Heritage listing ==
As at 26 October 2011, The Commercial Banking Company of Sydney set up its first Campbelltown office in McGuannes House in 1874 and moved into its own premises at 263 Queen Street, in 1881. The Italianate style building was designed by Victoria's Mansfield Brothers, the architects responsible for a number of the bank's projects.

The bank complements the old Post Office next door in period, scale and style and together these make an important contribution to this area of Queen Street.

CBC Bank was listed on the New South Wales State Heritage Register on 2 April 1999.

== See also ==
- Australian non-residential architectural styles
