= Merv Harbinson =

Australian rules footballer

Personal information
- Full name: Mervyn John Harbinson
- Born: 11 June 1959 (age 67)
- Original team: Coburg
- Height: 180 cm (5 ft 11 in)
- Weight: 83 kg (183 lb)

Playing career^{1}
Years	Club	Games (Goals)
1984–1985	Essendon	2 (0)
- ^{1} Playing statistics correct to the end of 1985.

Mervyn John "Merv" Harbinson (born 11 June 1959) is a former Australian rules footballer who played with Essendon in the Victorian Football League (VFL).

Harbinson started out in the Victorian Football Association, where he played for Coburg.

A rover/half forward, he was a good performer in the Essendon reserves, winning both a best and fairest and premiership in 1983. Already 25, Harbinson made his VFL debut in 1984, which came in Essendon's win over Carlton at Princes Park in round 19. His only other senior appearance was against Collingwood the following year, in round 15. He was the reserves best and fairest winner again in 1985. Both of the years he played senior football were premiership years for Essendon.

In 1986 he returned to Coburg for one season, then made his way to West Adelaide in 1987.
