= CBC Bank Building, Berrima =

CBC Bank Building
- Location within New South Wales Location within Australia
- 34.4891°S 150.3341°E
- Location: 12 Jellore Street, Berrima, Wingecarribee Shire, New South Wales, Australia

New South Wales Heritage Register
- Official name: First Bank, The (former); The Barn Gallery (former name of 2 blocks)
- Type: state heritage (built)
- Designated: 2 April 1999
- Reference no.: 105
- Type: Bank
- Category: Finance

CBC Bank Building is a heritage-listed bank building at 12 Jellore Street, Berrima, in the Southern Highlands region of New South Wales, Australia. It is also known as The First Bank and The Barn Gallery. It was added to the New South Wales State Heritage Register on 2 April 1999.

== History ==
The land consisting of numbers 10, 12 and 14 Jellore Street was purchased by John Keighran of Campelltown in 1834 and 1835. Under the terms of the sale a house was to be erected within 2 years of the 1834 sale. The house would have been completed by 1836 as ownership of the land remained with members of Keighran's family until 1882.

It is often described as having been a bakery before its use as a bank, and was possibly the bakery of Dalley and Allen.

The Commercial Banking Company of Sydney were the first bank in Berrima, operating a local branch from 1866 to 1894. Although it operated out of multiple premises in the town, the Jellore Street building is by far the most well known, and is often referred to as "The First Bank".

It was used as an antique shop in recent times, but is now a private residence.

== Description ==
The former CBC Bank building is a single storey ashlar stone cottage in the Colonial Georgian style with a hipped roof. The main roof is continued over the front verandah which is also hip roofed. The two stone chimneys to each of the east and west elevations have simple raised neck moulds. The 2 front windows are 2 x 6 paned double hung sashes and have timber shutters.

An upgraded extension (improving on 1974-5 extension of poor quality) was undertaken to the east side (c. 2000) and a significant renovation and extension to the rear of the cottage took place in 2006.

== Significance ==
The first bank is significant through its associations with the commercial development of Berrima from the early period of settlement when it was Berrima's first bank through to its use by the antique trade. It is now a private residence. It also has aesthetic significance as a good representative example in the context of the Southern Highlands, of an early "Colonial Georgian" style of stone cottage where the original form is relatively intact and much of the exterior original fabric remains. Together with other similar buildings in Berrima, it contributes to the historic character of the town as a whole and to the Jellore Street streetscape in particular.

== Heritage listing ==
CBC Bank Building was listed on the New South Wales State Heritage Register on 2 April 1999.
