= George Ogilvie =

Australian theatre director and actor (1931–2020)

George Ogilvie AM
- Born: George Buchan Ogilvie; 5 March 1931; Goulburn, New South Wales, Australia
- Died: 5 April 2020 (aged 89); Braidwood, New South Wales, Australia
- Occupations: Theatre, film and TV director; actor; screenwriter; drama teacher
- Years active: 1945–2014

George Buchan Ogilvie AM (5 March 1931 – 5 April 2020) was a prolific Australian theatre director and actor, who also worked as a director and actor in film and television. He was known for being the founding artistic director of the State Theatre Company of South Australia, and was also an educator.

== Early life and education ==
George Buchan Ogilvie was born on 5 March 1931 in Goulburn, New South Wales. He had an identical twin brother, Jim, two other brothers, and three sisters. His parents were from northern Scotland, his father a baker and his mother a graduate of both Aberdeen and Edinburgh universities. They migrated to Australia during the Great Depression in 1930, which affected Australia as well, causing the family to move from Goulburn to Canberra when the bakery business failed.

Ogilvie did not like the emphasis on sport at the state school he attended in Canberra, but enjoyed being able to participate in drama classes. He started a course in accountancy after finishing school, but did not complete the exams, realising that it did not suit him.

== Career ==
=== Stage ===
Ogilvie began his career as an actor at the Canberra Repertory Theatre. In 1952, after saving enough money, he moved to the UK, and joined a travelling theatre company in Wales, and then a repertory group in Aberystwyth. However, after being called up for the British Army, he returned to Australia and found acting work in Melbourne, including a role in Blood Wedding at the Union Theatre in 1958.

In 1960 he returned to the UK, enjoying some success as a mime, as part of clowning duo with English actor Julian Chagrin in Chaganog at the Edinburgh Festival, and the Vaudeville and St Martin's Theatres in London in 1964. He also studied under Jacques Lecoq in Paris during this period, and taught at the Central School of Speech and Drama in London.

In 1965, he returned to Australia to take up the position of associate director with the Melbourne Theatre Company, where he stayed for six years and directed around 20 plays. In 1972 he was appointed inaugural artistic director at the State Theatre Company of South Australia (STCSA), a position he held for four years. While at STCSA, he had many successes, including productions of Jugglers Three, Major Barbara, A Flea in Her Ear, Equus, The Winslow Boy, As You Like It, Journey's End, and Coriolanus. During his tenure, STCA moved into the Dunstan Playhouse in the newly-built Adelaide Festival Centre in 1974. Ogilvie produced, directed, and commissioned several Australian plays, including David Williamson's The Department, written especially for the company and later enjoying national success. He was supported there by Rodney Fisher and Helmut Bakaitis.

This was followed by 12 years as part of the subsidised theatre network, working freelance. In 1977 he staged the opera Lucrezia Borgia, starring Joan Sutherland, who said that he was "the first director ever to teach her to act". In 1979 he ventured into ballet, staging Coppélia. From 1988 he worked with the Australian Opera, the Australian Ballet, and Sydney Theatre Company, among others.

In his memoir, he wrote that the best work he had performed was his production of Chekhov's Three Sisters at the Russell Street Theatre in Melbourne in 1968.

=== Screen ===
Ogilvie's television acting credits include the 1983 miniseries The Dismissal and the 1984 miniseries Bodyline (1984) (where he was one of the writers and also directed three of the seven episodes). He directed the TV films The Shiralee (1987); Touch the Sun: Princess Kate (1988); and The Battlers (1994); followed by two episodes of the miniseries The Feds (1994) and 11 episodes of the long-running police series Blue Heelers between 2002 and 2006.

His film credits include Mad Max Beyond Thunderdome (1985), which he directed together with George Miller, Short Changed (1985), the much-awarded The Place at the Coast (1987), and The Crossing (1990), where Russell Crowe was first seen on the screen. One of his final screen appearances was in Crowe's The Water Diviner (2014).

== Other activities ==
Ogilvie regularly taught and directed at NIDA and Actors Centre Australia.

In 1978, he travelled to India to consult a Siddha Yoga guru, and later spent time at the Siddha Meditation Ashram in Newtown, Sydney. He felt that meditation and physical exercise helped his creativity.

== Recognition and awards ==
Ogilvie was awarded a three-year Australian Creative Artists Fellowship, and was the recipient of three Melbourne Theatre Critics Awards for Best Director.

In 1983 he was appointed a Member of the Order of Australia (AM) in the 1983 Queen's Birthday Honours for his services to the theatre and the performing arts.

In 1988, Ogilvie was awarded the Byron Kennedy Award.

== Later life and death ==
In 2006, Ogilvie's autobiography: Simple Gifts – a life in the theatre, was published by Currency Press.

He spent the last three years of his life sharing a home with his sister Carol.

Ogilvie died, on 5 April 2020, aged 89. He was survived by sisters Carol and Jean. Artists who paid tribute to him included Russell Crowe, Noni Hazelhurst, Kate Mulvany, Patrick Frost, and Bruce Spence.
