= Short Changed =

- Directed by: George Ogilvie
- Written by: Bob Merritt
- Starring: David Kennedy; Jamie Agius
- Cinematography: Peter Levy
- Edited by: Richard Francis-Bruce
- Music by: Chris Neal
- Distributed by: Greater Union
- Release date: 13 November 1986
- Country: Australia
- Language: English
- Budget: A$1.2 million
- Box office: A$14,000 (Australia)

Short Changed is a 1986 Australian film directed by George Ogilvie based on a script by Aboriginal writer Bob Merritt, who described it as a "black/white Kramer vs Kramer".

== Plot ==
After spending six years in the bush, Stuart, a young Aboriginal man, is trying to get in contact with his nine-year-old son, who lives with his white mother and grandfather in a well-to-do area, goes to a Christian Brothers school, and is unaware of his father's existence.

== Cast ==
The cast included a number of Merritt's Eora Centre students, among others.

- David Kennedy as Stuart Wilkins
- Susan Leith as Alison Wilkins
- Jamie Agius as Tommy Wilkins
- Ray Meagher as Marshall
- Mark Little as Curly
- Steve Dodd as Old Drunk
- Rhys McConnochie as School Principal
- Ron Haddrick as Garrick
- 'Lucky' Wikramanayake as Gopowalla
- Lyndel Rowe as Counsellor
- Jennifer Vuletic as Real Estate Assistant
- Louise Christie as Mother at Zoo
- Michael Gow as Sinclair

== Production ==
Merritt started working on the script in 1981 and wanted to direct himself. However he was worried about getting the project financed with him as director and instead decided to work with George Ogilvie, who had directed Merritt's play The Cake Man in 1976, and was a member of staff at Merritt's Eora Centre for the Visual and Performing Arts in Sydney.

The film was partly funded by the New South Wales Film Corporation. Shooting started in April 1985 and went for seven weeks. There were some technical problems making the movie which held up its release.

== Reception ==
The film was not a box-office success, but it remains notable as one of the first films by an Aboriginal writer. National Film & Sound Archive curators later described it as a depiction of "the daily struggle for dignity of a contemporary black man caught between two worlds", and called it "a successful collaboration between an Indigenous writer and a non-Indigenous director".

Critic David Stratton wrote that it was "an excellent film which presents a very vital problem with great sympathy, understanding and fairness... one of the most interesting, low-budget, urban Australian films to have come out in recent years".

== Awards ==
The film was nominated in several categories in the 1986 AFI Awards, but did not win any of them.
