= Middleburg =

Middleburg may refer to several places:

== United States ==
- Middleburg, Florida
- Middleburg, Iowa
- Middleburg, Kentucky
- Middleburg, Carroll County, Maryland
- Middleburg, Washington County, Maryland
- Middleburg, a Dutch settlement on Long Island, now Elmhurst, Queens, New York, U.S.
- Middleburg, North Carolina
- Middleburg, Jefferson County, Ohio
- Middleburg, Logan County, Ohio
- Middleburg, Noble County, Ohio
- Middleburg, Seneca County, Ohio
- Middleburg, Pennsylvania
- Middleburg, Virginia

== Other places ==
- Middleburg Island or Pulau Middelburg, Tambrauw, an island in West Papua, Indonesia

== See also ==
- Middleburg Heights, Ohio
- Middleburg Township, Ohio
- Middleburgh (disambiguation)
- Middelburg (disambiguation)
- Middleberg (disambiguation)
- Middletown (disambiguation)
