= Anna Maria Monticelli =

Australian actress and screen writer

- Born: 1952 (age 73–74); Tangiers, Morocco
- Other names: Anna Jemison
- Occupations: Actor, screenwriter, producer
- Known for: Silver City (film)
- Spouse(s): Steve Jacobs (Actor and director)
- Children: 1

Anna Maria Monticelli is an Australian actress, screenwriter and producer.

== Early life ==
Monticelli was born in 1952 in Tangiers in Morocco. In her childhood, she lived in five European countries, where, fluent in four languages, she was a translator for her French-Italian father and Spanish mother. The family emigrated to Australia when Monticelli was in her primary school years.

== Career ==
Using the professional name 'Anna-Maryka', Monticelli started out as a model in Sydney, gracing the covers of Australian Playboy, Cleo and Vogue and appearing in television commercials. She then began hosting a weekly ethnic morning television show on the ABC, while studying evening drama classes.

Monticelli went on to become an actress, with numerous roles in television series and films, both in Australia and the US. Some of her early film roles include 1981 New Zealand thriller Smash Palace with Terence Donovan, 1982 drama film Heatwave alongside Judy Davis and 1982 suspense thriller The Dark Room. She also appeared with Wendy Hughes in 1984 film My First Wife, playing the role of Hilary.

Further recognition came when Monticelli won the 1984 AFI Award for Best Actress in a Supporting Role for her role as Anna in post-war drama film Silver City. Having originally used her married name 'Anna Jemison' professionally, she reverted back to her maiden name, Monticelli as she accepted the award.

In 1985, Monticelli appeared in American drama thriller Nomads, as Veronique, wife of Jean Charles Pommier, played by Pierce Brosnan. That same year, she also played Anne Winter, alongside Bryan Brown in The Empty Beach and appeared in family film Archer’s Adventure, opposite Nicole Kidman in one of her earliest roles.

Monticelli's television credits began with a guest role in 1981 sports drama series Sporting Chance with Noni Hazlehurst In 1984, she had an ongoing role as Eva Tarrant in Carson's Law, opposite Lorraine Bayly. In 1994, she appeared in the children's sci-fi adventure series Sky Trackers, in the regular role of Marie Colbert, alongside her husband Steve Jacobs. Further television credits include Family and Friends, Rafferty's Rules, Home and Away, The Girl from Tomorrow, the Mission Impossible television reboot and 1988 adventure miniseries, Emma: Queen of the South Seas, with Steve Bisley.

However, Monticelli's true passion lay in writing. Her first writing credit was 2001 feature film La Spagnola, which she also produced. After 28 failed approaches to producers who were too discouraged by the multilingual plot, Monicelli decided to produce the film herself, with husband Steve Jacobs assuming his first director's role. The film saw her nominated for a AFI Award for Best Original Screenplay in 2001 and a Film Critics Circle of Australia Awards for Best Original Screenplay in 2002. It was also Australia’s official entrant in the Foreign Language Category at the 2002 Academy Awards. It went on to receive several international awards and was widely distributed.

Monticelli's critically-acclaimed second film, Disgrace (2008), starring John Malkovich, was a screen adaptation of the Booker Prize-winning novel of the same name by J. M. Coetzee. The film won an array of awards, including the International Critic’s Award for Best Film at the 2008 Toronto International Film Festival, Best Feature Film Adaptation at the 2008 AWGIE Awards and Best Screenplay at the 2010 Film Critics Circle of Australia Awards. It was also shortlisted for Best Literary Adaptation of 2009 at the Frankfurt International Book Fair and the New South Wales Premier's Literary Awards. The film made the "10 Best Films of 2009" with Roger Ebert of The Chicago Sun, The New York Times and Stephen King for Entertainment Weekly.

Monticelli most recently produced the comedy film I’ve Always Wanted to Direct, which was shot just before Covid stopped the industry in its tracks. She also wrote her first play, Zugzwang.

== Personal life ==
Monticelli was first married to Channel Seven deputy news director Rick Jemison, before their separation in the early 1980s.

In 1985, together with American director John McTiernan, Monticelli had a daughter, Bella, who is also a director. McTiernan had directed Monticelli in the film Nomads.

Monticelli is married to actor and director Steve Jacobs. The couple met first met on the set of 1984 film Silver City in 1984, in which Jacobs also had a small part. They also appeared together in an episode of Mission Impossible and then fell in love on the set of Sky Trackers. Together, they formed Australian based company, 'Wild Strawberries' in the mid-1990s. The couple have lived in Palm Beach, north of Sydney, for over 40 years.

== Filmography ==
=== Film ===
Year	Title	Role	Type
1981	Smash Palace	Jacqui Shaw / Alan's wife	Feature film
1982	Heatwave	Victoria West	Feature film
1982	The Dark Room	Nicky / Ray's mistress	Feature film
1984	My First Wife	Hilary	Feature film
1984	Silver City	Anna	Feature film
1985	After Hours	Sandra Adams (first film credit as Anna-Maria Monticelli)	Film short
1985	The Empty Beach	Anne Winter	Feature film
1986	Nomads	Veronique 'Niki' Pommier	Feature film
1994	Life Forms	Mel	Film short
2004	The Brother	Catherine	Film short

=== Television ===
Year	Title	Role	Type
1981	A Sporting Chance	Guest role	Episode 3: "Whatever Happened to Stephen Doyle?"
1982	For the Term of His Natural Life	Alicia	Miniseries, 1 episode
1984	Special Squad	Teresa Parrissa	Episode 3: "Code of Silence"
1984	Carson's Law	Eva Tarrant	21 episodes
1985	Archer (aka Archer's Adventure)	Anna Swift (first TV credit as Anna-Maria Monticelli)	TV film
1985	Five Mile Creek	Guest role	1 episode
1985	Handle with Care	Kate	TV film
1987	The Edge of Power	Gail Traynor	TV film
1987	Play School	Guest Presenter	2 episodes
1988	Rafferty's Rules	Diana Newby	1 episode
1988	Emma: Queen of the South Seas	Princess Le'utu	Miniseries, 2 episodes
1988	Mission: Impossible	Lydia	Episode 4: "The Condemned"
1989	G.P.		1 episode
1989	Living with the Law		1 episode
1990	Family and Friends	Luciana Rossi	
1990; 1993	English at Work	Herself	4 episodes
1991	A Country Practice	Guest role	2 episodes
1991	Chances	Bella	1 episode
1992	The Girl from Tomorrow II	Freya	1 episode
1993	Eggshells		1 episode
1994	Under the Skin		2 episodes
1994	Sky Trackers	Marie Colbert	26 episodes
1995	Singapore Sling: Road to Mandalay	Tamara	TV film
2002	Home and Away	Helen Poulos	3 episodes
2002	White Collar Blue	Mrs. Cable	TV pilot / film

=== As writer / producer ===
Year	Title	Role	Type	Ref.
2001	La Spagnola	Writer / producer	Feature film	
2008	Disgrace	Writer / producer	Feature film	
c.2020	I’ve Always Wanted to Direct (aka Siempre He Querido Dirigir)	Producer	Feature film	

== Awards ==
Year	Work	Award	Category	Result	Ref.
1984	Silver City	AFI Awards	Best Actress in a Supporting Role	Won	
2001	La Spagnola	AFI Awards	Best Original Screenplay	Nominated	
2002	La Spagnola	Film Critics Circle of Australia Awards	Best Original Screenplay	Nominated	
2008	Disgrace	AWGIE Awards	Best Feature Film Adaptation	Won	
2008	Disgrace	Toronto International Film Festival	International Critic’s Award for Best Film	Won	
2009	Disgrace	Frankfurt International Book Fair	Best Literary Adaptation	Shortlisted	
2009	Disgrace	NSW Premier’s Literary Awards	Best Literary Adaptation	Shortlisted	
2010	Disgrace	Film Critics Circle of Australia Awards	Best Screenplay	Won	
2010	Disgrace	Film Critics Circle of Australia Awards	Best Film (producer)	Nominated	
	Anna Maria Monticelli	Cavaliere Medal	Order of Merit from the Italian Republic for services to the arts	Honoured	
