= Middleberg =

Middleberg may refer to:

- Middleberg, Oklahoma

== See also ==
- Middelberg
- Middleburg (disambiguation)
- Middelburg (disambiguation)
