= Ansara =

Ansara is a surname. Notable people with the surname include:

- Alice Ansara, Australian actress and dramaturg, daughter of Martha
- Martha Ansara (born 1942), Australian film director, screenwriter, and cinematographer
- Michael Ansara (1922–2013), Syrian-born American actor and voice actor
