= John McTiernan's unrealized projects =

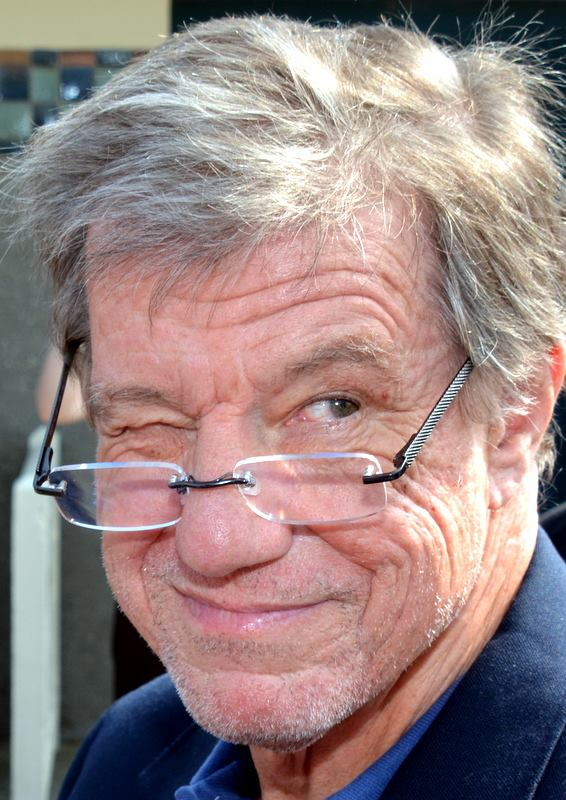
McTiernan in 2014

During his long career, American film director John McTiernan has worked on a number of projects which never progressed beyond the pre-production stage under his direction. Some of these projects fell in development hell, were officially canceled, were in development limbo or would see life under a different production team.

== 1980s ==
=== The Quest of St. James Elk ===
In 1981, McTiernan wrote the original screenplay for a planned film called The Quest of St. James Elk, which was to have been produced by Elliott Kastner through Winkast Film Productions, based at Pinewood Studios. However, the film was pulled from production just before the start. McTiernan's concept art and storyboards from the unproduced film were later salvaged and auctioned.

=== Sgt. Rock ===
Shortly after they did Predator together, McTiernan, Arnold Schwarzenegger, and writer Shane Black were all set to team on a big-budget film adaptation of the DC Comics character Sgt. Rock. According to McTiernan in the book The Last Action Heroes by Nick de Semlyen, the project was heavily developed in 1988 and 1989 only to be demolished by actor John Cleese, who would have starred opposite Schwarzenegger. As McTiernan explained, everyone was so attached to the idea of Cleese co-starring with Schwarzenegger that when Cleese declined, the project fell apart. "As far as he was concerned, we were just a couple thug American action-movie makers," McTiernan said. "If he'd seen Die Hard, I think he probably would have signed up. But he judged us on our reputation." McTiernan would go on to make The Hunt for Red October instead. In a 1988 interview, it was suggested that McTiernan could possibly direct another film elsewhere before embarking on Sgt. Rock.

=== Cortes ===
In 1988, McTiernan was approached to direct Cortes, a historical epic about Hernán Cortés from a Nicholas Kazan screenplay and with Edward R. Pressman producing, but Kazan and Pressman could not get the film funded.

=== Alien 3 ===
Also in 1988, it was confirmed by McTiernan that he was involved during the early stages of development on a third Alien film, and held several discussions with the involved parties about directing it. "Walter Hill and I talked about it, and then... They had this script... It's the kind of thing that, for one reason or another, doesn't work out," said McTiernan. His proposal involved the Xenomorphs arriving on Earth and spreading some kind of virus, explaining his rationale: "In every Alien film, we get closer to Earth, but we never actually reach it. I asked them why they were doing that. For me, the only real threat was that the extraterrestrials would arrive on Earth." Though McTiernan was under the impression that Ridley Scott had gotten the position, Alien 3 was ultimately realized by David Fincher and did not see release until 1992.

=== The Adventures of Robin Hood ===
As early as 1989, McTiernan had been attached to direct 20th Century Fox's The Adventures of Robin Hood, titled after the 1938 film, which was planned to be made after he finished Road Show. At the same time, two other competing Robin Hood projects were in development at Morgan Creek Entertainment and Tri-Star Pictures. All three intended to portray how Robin Hood became an outlaw hiding out in the Sherwood Forest in Nottinghamshire. The central character of McTiernan's version was named Sir Robert Hode, a young Saxon noble more interested in wine and women, until the threat of a lashing by the Norman authorities sends him racing to the woods. The script was written by Mark Allen Smith. Fox hoped that Mel Gibson would agree to star in the film, though he turned it down over concerns of doing several "period pieces" in a row. In 1990, a race between the three projects ensued, with Tri-Star announcing a September 3 start date and Fox planning for an October 22 start. Plans, however, began to fall apart by late July when Kevin Costner signed on to star in Morgan Creek's Robin Hood: Prince of Thieves. According to director Kevin Reynolds, Costner had originally been offered to star in McTiernan's version but the producers at Morgan Creek offered him more money, so he joined their production instead. Though his was not made, McTiernan participated as executive producer in a low-budget, made-for-television version of Robin Hood which utilized Mark Allan Smith's story treatment.

== 1990s ==
=== Road Show ===
In February 1990, McTiernan was set to direct Road Show for 20th Century Fox, with Sean Connery and Cher set to possibly star. The film, a romantic action-adventure based on The Last Cattle Drive by Robert Day, was to have been produced by McTiernan along with his then-wife Donna Dubrow, who described it as "The African Queen on the range". Robert Getchell's adapted script had spent over a decade in development, with directors Martin Ritt and Richard Brooks both attached to helm at separate stages, before McTiernan's involvement. Filming was expected to officially begin that summer in Montana and Wyoming.

=== Hoffa ===
An LA Times report stated that McTiernan had been one of the top contenders—alongside Barry Levinson and Oliver Stone—to take the helm of David Mamet's Hoffa screenplay. McTiernan met with producer Edward R. Pressman to discuss his vision for the story, but after actor Danny DeVito expressed enthusiasm in directing Hoffa at a meeting in April 1990, Pressman awarded him the job.

=== A Princess of Mars ===
In late 1990, McTiernan became attached to direct a film based on the science fantasy novel A Princess of Mars. The project was part of his three-picture deal with Cinergi and was budgeted at $60 million. He hired screenwriter Bob Gale, whose take on the material offered more humor and incorporated elements from several earlier drafts written by Ted Elliott and Terry Rossio. McTiernan also hired illustrator and concept artist William Stout, who would design several elaborate costumes for animals to wear. Stout later recalled of his experience working on the film:

"Two days into that job had me in the middle of a huge depression. They were going to use camels and elephants in creature suits... There was no way that you could get any of this stuff to look like the [Edgar Rice] Burroughs stuff."

By 1992, McTiernan had attached Sam Resnick, whom he had worked with previously on the television film Robin Hood, to rewrite. Around this time, Tom Cruise also became loosely attached to the project as John Carter, with Julia Roberts approached to play the Princess of Mars, Dejah Thoris. As development continued, McTiernan became increasingly dissatisfied with the limitations of the technology at the time, convinced that CGI was the only way to go. Ultimately, he left the project to direct Last Action Hero, but nevertheless was still paid for his work.

=== Die Hard 3: Troubleshooter ===
Following the release of Die Hard 2—with which McTiernan had no involvement in—around 1991, he developed an unproduced iteration of a third film based on a spec script from 1990 titled Troubleshooter. The premise involved John McClane fighting terrorists aboard a cruise ship, and was later abandoned by the filmmakers due to conceptual similarities to the film Under Siege. According to McTiernan, Troubleshooter never happened because "Fox was wrangling with Bruce [Willis] over money." The studio later utilized most of the material they had developed for the film into Speed 2: Cruise Control, including "the ocean liner going on the beach."

=== 73 Easting ===
In 1992, Tom Clancy was in negotiations with Universal Pictures to write his first screenplay for McTiernan to direct based on the experiences of three military captains who led an assault on Saddam Hussein's Republican Guard. The film was given the tentative title of 73 Easting and would have been made with the cooperation of the U.S. Army. The rights to the stories of the three soldiers were secured by Vecchio Productions, who was set to co-produce with McTiernan's own Tongue River Productions.

=== Texas Lead and Gold ===
Around 1992, after the success of Unforgiven, McTiernan circled to direct the spec script Texas Lead and Gold by Jim Gorman and Michael Frost Beckner, which was described as an adventure story reminiscent of The Treasure of the Sierra Madre. It famously became the highest-selling screenplay at that time, producing a bidding war amongst various studios, with the first offer going for $1 million.

=== Bitterroot ===
In April 1993, Paramount Pictures was developing Bitterroot, to have been directed by McTiernan and star Brad Pitt, who would eventually drop out due to scheduling conflicts. Offers had also gone out to Mel Gibson, Tom Cruise and Richard Gere, all of whom declined. Later that month, the film was put into pre-production turnaround, allowing McTiernan and producer Donna Dubrow to set it up at a rival studio following Paramount's concerns over the casting and the projected $50 million budget. According to Dubrow, the studio "seemed to feel that Keanu Reeves and Gene Hackman weren't enough to proceed." Bitterroot was written by David Shaber and was to have told the story of the 1877 Nez Perce Indian War. In November 2009, McTiernan reaffirmed his intent to direct the film, saying it's a project he's "dreamed of making for a long time." He went on to add that if he were given a check for $150 million to make any film of his choosing, it would be the Nez Perce project, but specified that he would not require that amount. "For that price, I can make three films. Three big films, even." Two months later, Scottish filmmaker Diane Bell revealed to IndieWire that she was working with McTiernan on the script for Bitterroot.

=== Treasure Island ===
As reported in June 1993, McTiernan had at once "toyed" with directing a film of the Robert Louis Stevenson classic Treasure Island, but since had opted to take on the producing role.

=== Captain Blood remake ===
McTiernan was set to direct a remake of the 1935 film Captain Blood for Warner Bros., though he dropped out in December 1993 over creative differences and went on to do Die Hard with a Vengeance in its place. The script was written by Jonathan Hensleigh and McTiernan wanted Alec Baldwin to play the title role. Mel Gibson was also seriously considered to star as well, since his name would more easily obtain a greenlight.

=== Without Remorse ===
In November 1993, Warner Bros. lined up McTiernan as its director of the screen adaptation of Tom Clancy's bestseller Without Remorse, which was to be written by Christine Roum and produced by Brandon Tartikoff. Roum was to have reportedly started writing the script by the end of that year. McTiernan was still attached to make the film by January 1995.

=== GoldenEye ===
Before Pierce Brosnan was selected to be the new James Bond, McTiernan—who had worked with Brosnan on Nomads—had two meetings with series producers Albert R. Broccoli and his daughter Barbara about directing the next Bond film. He recalled, "About halfway through each of those lunches, [Broccoli] just dropped outta the conversation, 'cause he'd decided he wasn't letting me anywhere near his movie." However, McTiernan had recommended Brosnan for the role when they were contemplating who to cast, and the actor would go on to star in GoldenEye.

=== Juggernaut ===
Around 1994, author and screenwriter Dan Bronson worked with McTiernan on a planned sci-fi action thriller called Juggernaut, which was set to be directed by McTiernan for MGM through his Tongue River Productions banner. Bronson had been working on the 1995 TV film Midnight Obsession, but left in order to write the script for Juggernaut instead. The film was never made.

=== The Hulk ===
In the mid-1990s, Universal Pictures slated McTiernan to direct their version of The Hulk, based on the Marvel Comics character. Bodybuilder Joe DeAngelis was chosen for the part of Dr. Banner, and had even posed for Industrial Light & Magic animators. Universal terminated further plans when the projected budget rose above $100 million and the script turned off the worldwide fanbase. Taiwanese filmmaker Ang Lee later helmed the 2003 Hulk film, which used a different script and had Eric Bana in the title role.

=== Master and Commander ===
In the mid-to-late 1990s, McTiernan was going to direct an adaptation of Master and Commander, the first in the Aubrey–Maturin novel series from Patrick O'Brian, which was developed for Touchstone Pictures. However, Touchstone pulled the project from development, allowing the screen rights to be purchased by Fox where the 2003 film was eventually made, directed by Peter Weir.

=== Airframe ===
In November 1996, it was reported that McTiernan would direct film adaptations of the Michael Crichton novels Airframe and Eaters of the Dead for Touchstone Pictures. William Wisher Jr. wrote the adaptations for both. By May 1998, after finishing production on Eaters of the Dead (later retitled to The 13th Warrior), McTiernan left Airframe to direct the remake of The Thomas Crown Affair for United Artists. At various points, Geena Davis, Jodie Foster, Demi Moore, Candice Bergen, Susan Sarandon and Sigourney Weaver were all linked to the project to play the lead female role, Casey Singleton. Matthew McConaughey was also said to be interesting in the role of pilot Ted Rawley. In a 1999 interview, McTiernan said, "As far as I'm concerned, the project is definitely dead. The studio paid $8 million to buy the rights to the book, but they'll have to find someone else to adapt it for the screen."

=== Cold, Cold Heart ===
As reported in March 1997, J. C. Pollock's post-Cold War suspense thriller book Cold, Cold Heart, written under the pseudonym James Elliot, had been optioned by Cinergi for McTiernan to possibly produce or direct or both. The following year, Paramount Pictures picked up the option for Mace Neufeld to produce as a potential directing vehicle for Phillip Noyce.

=== Nimitz Class ===
In early 1997, McTiernan optioned the rights to the techno-thriller Nimitz Class for Universal Pictures soon after the novel's publication. McTiernan intended to direct the film through his producer and then-wife, Donna DuBrow, who refused to allow it to be made following their separation.

=== Pillar of Fire ===
In 1998, a film set to be directed by McTiernan called Pillar of Fire was in development at Columbia Pictures.

=== Quiller ===
In May 1999, McTiernan was in talks to direct the film adaptation of Elleston Trevor's Quiller book series through United Artists.

=== Cracking Angela ===
In August 1999, it was reported by Variety that McTiernan had set up a fourth project at MGM, a collaboration with erotic author Elissa Wald. While no plot details were disclosed, McTiernan stated at the time that it was a "sexy love story kind of thing." By 2001, the title of Wald's script was revealed as Cracking Angela, with McTiernan attached as producer.

== 2000s ==
=== The Saint TV series ===
In January 2000, a new TV series adaptation of The Saint from McTiernan was in the works at UPN, with McTiernan attached to the project as executive producer through Artists Television Group.

=== The Extractors ===
In November 2000, after finishing Rollerball for MGM, McTiernan was in discussions with the studio to direct The Extractors for a possible production start in March of the following year. The screenplay by Kevin Fox and James DeMonaco was described by The Hollywood Reporter as an action-thriller "about a group of ex-cons who break prisoners out of jail for a price." Samuel L. Jackson was being considered to star in the project. It was reportedly still being actively developed as of April 2001, with Jackson confirmed to star.

=== Smoke and Mirrors ===
In January 2001, McTiernan was the front-runner to direct the long-in-development film Smoke and Mirrors, for Initial Entertainment Group. Michael Douglas and Catherine Zeta-Jones were attached to star. The project was based loosely on an actual 1856 event where the French government sent magician Jean-Eugène Robert-Houdin to quell an uprising in Algeria begun by an alleged sorcerer. The original script was written by Lee and Janet Batchler six years prior, with subsequent revisions done by Ted Henning. In May, it was reported that a mid-fall start date was being eyed, and that a rewrite of the script was being done by Leslie Dixon. In June, McTiernan left the project, citing "insurmountable business differences", and the production was later shelved indefinitely due to escalating costs.

=== The Garbo Deception ===
In January 2002, it was reported that McTiernan would direct a World War II film starring Kevin Spacey, John Travolta and Gérard Depardieu entitled The Garbo Deception. Emmanuelle Béart and Sigourney Weaver were also reported to star. The film was based on the life of Juan "Garbo" Pujol, who fooled the Nazis by creating a fictitious spy network.

=== The Booster ===
In August 2002, McTiernan was in talks to direct the film adaptation of the late Eugene Izzi's novel The Booster with Sheldon Turner writing the script for Intermedia Films and Mark Johnson's production company. The following month, Vin Diesel and Morgan Freeman were touted as possible stars.

=== Judge Dee ===
In 2003, McTiernan was attached to direct the $45 million action-adventure Murder In Canton, adapted from the Judge Dee mystery novel of the same name, which was being produced with financial backing from TF1. Production was scheduled to start by the end of the year in New Zealand and China. At the 2004 Cannes Film Festival, a promotional poster for the film—bearing the title Judge Dee—was on display. McTiernan was to shoot the film at Hengdian World Studios. Producer Peter Loehr told Shanghai-based newspaper Jiefang Daily that his criteria to whoever would play Judge Dee was that they had to be young, of Chinese ethnicity, and have the ability to speak fluent English. It was said that preliminary filming did begin but that, after a while, they concluded it wouldn't amount to anything. Production was then halted with the plan to restart it at a later date; which ultimately was not met.

=== Crash Bandits ===
In 2005, McTiernan had been preparing to direct the action adventure script Crash Bandits through Bauer-Martinez Studios, with Hayden Christensen set to star. Production was initially set to commence on February 15, 2006 in Thailand, though this would be delayed. McTiernan described the project as "A delightful story about two guys who make money by finding old crashed World War II planes in various end-of-the-way places." A breach-of-contract suit was filed by Bauer-Martinez who demanded that McTiernan return his fee and damages of $2 million for failing to disclose his involvement in the Anthony Pellicano court case. He was still attached to film Crash Bandits prior to serving time in prison, but as of April 2013, he was no longer involved.

=== Deadly Exchange ===
In 2006, McTiernan was set to helm Deadly Exchange, from Ronald Shusett and Ian Rabin's screenplay, with Anthony J. Ridio and Ellen Wander producing through Film Bridge Intl. The project revolves around a terrorist who goes undetected as he hunts down the FBI agent who assassinated his father ten years earlier. It was being prepared for a production start in the late summer of that year, in Shreveport, Louisiana, but this never came to pass. Diane Bell was at one point enlisted by McTiernan to help perform rewrites to the script, which they developed at the director's ranch in Wyoming. Starting from the ground up, the two turned it into what she called "a Frankenstein story" that was still about an exchange student coming to America to commit a terrorist act, but which justified the character's actions and sympathized with him. "We imbued that character with like a great deal of innocence, and charm of a certain kind. Like, he was a monster, but he had been made a monster, you know; like Frankenstein, you know, it wasn't his fault that he was a monster". Deadly Exchange was one of four different directing projects that McTiernan was forced to abandon due to insurance issues following his felony conviction.

=== Run ===
In May 2007, it was reported that McTiernan would helm the $30 million action thriller Run with Michael Pierce and Mark Williams producing, and Karl Urban attached to star as an Interpol agent who uncovers a fraud conspiracy. The script supposedly features one hundred pages of car chases. At that time, principal photography was estimated for August and post in London. By February the following year, Thomas Jane had taken over Urban's role and filming was to begin April 14 on location in Argentina. "BMW has come onboard to provide the cars, and Roush Performance is designing a Super Mustang for the film, setting up what will be a spectacular vehicle stunt-action chase movie," teased Arclight Films' Gary Hamilton, one of the producers. Run was among three projects in development as of 2009, along with The Murder of Orson Welles and Bitterroot, however it too was shelved in the face of McTiernan's criminal charges. Three Mustangs were built for the film.

=== High Stakes ===
In June 2007, it was announced that McTiernan was set to direct High Stakes, a Las Vegas-set action thriller, for Persistent Entertainment and Velvet Octopus. Written by Ronnie Christensen, the premise follows two friends who find themselves to be the living collateral of a high-stakes bet. Matthew Rhodes, Judd Payne and Keri Selig were attached as producers on the film, which was scheduled to begin shooting that fall in Shreveport and Las Vegas. McTiernan was forced to abandon the project as well, due to his legal troubles.

=== The Chase ===
Official synopsis for The Chase

Getaway driver SCALPEL is the best in the business. A former NYC cabbie and test driver for Lamborghini, behind a wheel he can slice through streets with surgical precision, a skill that's tested to the limit when he signs up for a heist that goes awry.

Barely escaping the clutches of the law following an epic, tire melting pursuit, Scalpel promises his teenage daughter SAMANTHA that he's retired, much to the chagrin of his arch nemesis RAY, a crooked cop with one obsession: taking the top wheelman in town down.

When sexy, mysterious DAISY offers Scalpel a job taking her billionaire father for an illegal but highly lucrative joyride, Scalpel resists the temptation until Ray tries to get to him by terrorizing Samantha.

Realizing the only way to escape Ray is to leave town forever, Scalpel accepts Daisy's offer. It's the only way to raise the stake to leave, even though he knows she isn't who she claims to be. In fact, Daisy is working for Ray and the job is a frame up, but running out of choices and time there's only one option left for Scalpel... to square off with Ray for a showdown on wheels.

In October 2009, Arclight Films listed an upcoming project on its website with McTiernan attached as director, Scott Reynolds attached as screenwriter, and Gary Hamilton and Mike Gabrawy attached as producers, entitled The Chase. It was described as an action film centering on a skilled getaway driver named Scalpel (formerly an NYC cabbie and Lamborghini test driver), who tries to escape his criminal past and the crooked cop, Ray, who is determined to bring him down. The project first debuted the following month at the American Film Market and was later part of the listing for the European Film Market presented as part of Berlinale in February 2010. On January 10, 2010, Toutlecine.com reported that Hayden Christensen had been cast as the lead and was then taking driving lessons for the role. The next day, European movie database Cinando indicated The Chase as being in pre-production, to be completed in 2010, and with Australia listed as the main country.

=== The Murder of Orson Welles ===
In a November 2009 interview for AlloCiné, McTiernan named an upcoming project of his, The Murder of Orson Welles, which would be set during the spring of 1942 and tell the story of the making of the never-completed "Carnaval" segment of Welles' It's All True. Specifically, it would tackle how the director was metaphorically "killed" in the United States while filming scenes in Brazil. As a result of the drowning of local fisherman Jacaré, for which he was held responsible, and cost overruns, Welles was subsequently ousted from his contract at RKO and branded persona non grata in Hollywood.

=== Untitled follow-up documentary film ===
Also in November 2009, progress on a "sequel" to McTiernan's 2009 online documentary The Political Prosecutions of Karl Rove, which compiles thirty-five interviews conducted by the director himself, was announced. This follow-up was brought about in the aftermath of the first film's release, and George W. Bush's departure from the White House, which had convinced other Americans to testify. It is not known how far into the making he got, but no additional film was made.

== 2010s ==
=== Shrapnel ===
In 2010, McTiernan was signed on to direct Evan Daugherty's 2008 Black List action thriller script Shrapnel through the Belgian production and financing company Corsan and the L.A.-based FilmEngine. He developed it as a vehicle for John Travolta and Nicolas Cage. Later that year, in December, he told The Hollywood Reporter that they were planning on starting production in the late spring of 2011 and indicated that the script was being altered from its original World War II setting to reflect a more modern timeline, suggesting the Gulf War. According to TheWrap, as of July 2011 McTiernan was apparently off location scouting in Canada for Shrapnel. Paul Sutton, who was called in to serve as a historian, claimed it was weeks away from shooting when it suddenly fell apart due to "insurance" issues. McTiernan was thus replaced by Mark Steven Johnson, and the project became Killing Season.

=== Warbirds ===
Official synopsis for Warbirds

AMOS HAWKINS is an amazing pilot who works as an aerial firefighter – a water bomber. But that's just his legitimate profession; he earns most of his money as an aerial mercenary. A Chilean man has hired Amos to bomb an oil field on a patch of land bordering Chile and Argentina. It should be a safe job, with no human casualties, but it's big enough that it will require a team.

Amos knows where to start looking for his team. He makes his way to a country club in Reno, which is hosting an air race. He makes his way through a swanky reception – being extra careful to avoid his ex-wife LAURIE, who is an excellent pilot in her own right. He recruits JOHANN VON KLEIST, a young brash pilot, and TULSA, a tall Chuck Yeager type who works the bar. HARRY HOLDEN, a tall, cocky and possibly insane pilot, sees him making the rounds and knows something is up. Amos reluctantly lets him join the team. Lastly, he approaches FRANK CALDER, a family man who has promised his wife he will never take these kinds of jobs anymore. Frank's twenty-one-year-old daughter PEGGY volunteers her services, and Frank assures Amos, "She's better'n both of us." Amos welcomes them both to the team.

The last piece of the puzzle is also the trickiest. IGNATIUS "IG" DAYTON is a cantankerous old man with a grudge against Amos. But with the promise of a quarter of a million dollars – plus bonus cash — he signs on. The team meets at an airstrip in Baja, joined by their controller, a ballsy woman affectionately known as MAMA.

The mission quickly goes south and Amos realizes it’s a trap. Faced with return fire, they fight their way out and barely manage to survive. Harry proves to be every bit as reckless as Amos feared, taking out bulldozers, dump trucks and anything else he can target. But he soon finds himself in the crosshairs of a Mig-15. He gets hit, but utilizes his ridiculous skills to evade any more fire. As the rest of the crew rendezvous at an abandoned airstrip, Harry has to crash-land his plane in Argentina.

The Mig pilot ejects from the plane and Harry gives chase. A fight reveals the pilot to be... LAURIE, Amos's ex-wife!

Amos visits the man who hired him, a suave businessman named NICOLAS CAMPOS, but Nicolas can't provide any answers for the ambush. Amos is left to figure out why he has been double-crossed and why his ex-wife is working for the other side.

In 2013, it was corroborated by L'Express that while McTiernan was awaiting his imminent arrest, he was in the midst of writing an original screenplay entitled Warbirds. It centers on a band of aerial firefighters who lead a "secret life" during winter months. McTiernan's wife Gail Sistrunk said that he hoped to revive his career with the film upon his release from prison. In August 2014, he announced that he was negotiating to direct Warbirds at Hannibal Films with John Travolta signed up to star. Offers had also gone out to Queen Latifah and Johnny Knoxville for additional parts, with McTiernan eyeing to begin shooting as early as autumn that year. The project became liquidized during his bankruptcy case. In October, Warbirds was scheduled to film in Atlanta, Georgia in January 2015, for a February 2016 release date. The start date was later bumped to March; a month following the project's planned debut at the Berlinale Series Market. However, in an interview for AlloCiné, McTiernan provided negative news: "[Travolta] was committed to the role. The problem was with Hannibal Films. When they found out it was with John... Anyway, we'll do it one of these days. But it's going to take some time before these people get off this project." Despite this claim, the company presented promotional material for Warbirds at the 2015 Cannes Film Festival.

=== Red Squad ===
Official synopsis for Red Squad

After his stakeout on the U.S. border results in bloodshed on both sides, TRENT MITCHELL, head of the DEA, convinces his deputy administrator, HAL, to help him put together a covert team to hopefully make a dent in the war on drugs. Trent sets out to find MARTIN CRANE, a mercenary currently working in the African jungle. Meanwhile, in the small Mexican town of Los Rojos, another police chief has been killed by the Giraldo Cartel. The oldest cop on the small force, EDUARDO LEON feels pressure to man up and take the job as police chief. But Leon knows that doing so will mark him for murder at the hands of ABEL GIRALDO, the vicious leader of the cartel.

In February 2014, McTiernan was set to direct Cam Cannon and Jorge Suarez's script Red Squad, with Cannon producing alongside Hannibal Films chairman/CEO Richard Rionda Del Castro, Michael Mendelsohn, Patricia Eberle, Hayley Arabia and Michael Tadross. Laurent Eyquem was brought on to be the film's composer. The following month, Nicolas Cage was circling the main role, with Al Pacino listed to co-star. In April, it was revealed that development had stalled because McTiernan viewed the current draft of the script as "offensive". However, according to Del Castro, though Cage was keen on Red Squad, "for whatever reason, Nic walked away just before Cannes. Nonetheless, Nic and [McTiernan] spoke last week, and we're proposing a new project for them." Cage's decision supposedly came too late to change the Cannes promo materials for Red Squad. By August, it was reported that the film was scheduled to commence production in January 2015. Though McTiernan was strongly considering it as one of his next directing projects, he disagreed with the producers who supposedly wanted to cast Arnold Schwarzenegger, feeling as though the star was not right for the material. "It's a bad idea," said McTiernan. "I have to convince them not to." In 2017, McTiernan was replaced by director Alexander Witt.

=== Thomas Crown and the Missing Lioness ===
In April 2014, McTiernan revealed he had written a sequel to The Thomas Crown Affair while serving his prison sentence, entitled Thomas Crown and the Missing Lioness, set in Europe. Like the first, this script also features a MacGuffin at its center. McTiernan explained the backstory of the title's provenance as follows:

"Nebuchadnezzar had two lion statues commissioned in 1100BC: a male and a female. Alexander the Great took them when he conquered Persia. Mark Antony had them taken to Rome. Constantine moved them to Constantinople. And at some point the lioness went missing. The movie is about what happens when it turns up at an auction. By the way, it's all bullshit; none of that ever happened. It's really a lot of fun and I hope I get the chance to make it."

A year later, McTiernan's attorneys reported the following to the bankruptcy court:

"John's fondest dream is to shoot a sequel to his very successful Thomas Crown Affair [...] When he first floated that bubble he met with consternation from MGM whose attorneys asserted a proprietary interest in the theme and demanded he cease and desist. Diligent follow-up on John's part has revealed that the original rights holder controls the concept and is quite amicable to the project."

McTiernan later clarified that The Missing Lioness was first written as an original piece—a "romantic European adventure" in the vein of films like To Catch a Thief and Charade—but that someone had proposed it be turned into a sequel to his Thomas Crown Affair, similarly to how the initial script for Die Hard with a Vengeance had been reworked into a Die Hard sequel.

=== Untitled Isoroku Yamamoto project ===
In a March 2015 interview for AlloCiné, when asked if he would make any more action films McTiernan replied that he would rather not, and instead mentioned a project which he said "fascinates" him; revolving around Admiral Isoroku Yamamoto. Expounding, he said that the film takes place in an alternate version of history in which Yamamoto and the Imperial Japanese Navy win World War II. "We'll see if it comes to fruition. It's much more inventive than most of what I've read lately," added McTiernan. He was still developing the project as of June 22, 2023, and said the story was based on prewar debates in Japan, portraying Yamamoto as advocating for a limited war aimed at gradually exhausting Western powers rather than seizing their territory. Five days later, McTiernan revealed that an episodic series was the project he was writing at that time, seemingly confirming it to be the Yamamoto project.

=== Venice Pier ===
In October 2015, The Hollywood Reporter announced that as McTiernan worked to "save" a proposed sequel to The Thomas Crown Affair, he was additionally discussing another project entitled Venice Pier. It was expected to bring in $1.2–2 million in director's fees. No further details were disclosed.

=== The Sleeping Dogs of Amagansett ===
On a third film McTiernan was working on and also looking to direct as of October 2015 called The Sleeping Dogs of Amagansett, his attorney said it was "rich in irony" and featured "evil investment bankers all being pet owners and [a] hero [who learns] to leave sleeping dogs lie."

=== Thin Rain ===
In January 2016, it was reported that Green Light International was launching sales at the Berlin Film Festival for a new McTiernan film called Thin Rain, an action thriller. McTiernan was to have directed from a script by Philip Shaw and Jeremy Sheldon about a former American mercenary's quest for redemption in Asia. Joe Simpson was set to produce for Miscellaneous Entertainment, along with GLI's Andrew Mann and Simon Fawcett.

=== Tau Ceti Foxtrot ===
While attending the Sofilm Summercamp festival in 2016, McTiernan announced his next project: an action film he had written, reportedly called Tau Ceti 4.4—named after a distant star. It was tipped to star Cate Blanchett in the lead female role, that of a retired officer. Providing further details, he teased that with the film, he wanted to play with temporal paradoxes: "The action seems to take place in Europe in the sixties, but it is an illusion." The story was to specifically center on "a childless woman and a motherless child," as described by McTiernan. He also stated at the time that the project was backed by a French company, would be shot possibly in France or Serbia, and would feature minimal dialogue—making it easy to produce both English and French language versions. In January 2019, McTiernan spoke to the French outlet Le Figaro, wherein he revealed that he was working on a new film, which would star Uma Thurman. "You could say it's a film about a 'Marxist mercenary'," he teased. "If you think that's the strangest project you've ever heard of, then you're on the right track!" The following month, during a NFI masterclass, McTiernan disclosed that he had just closed a deal with Thurman and said that they had landed the French distributor Wild Bunch for the project, which he called "a gunfire movie" that "looks like it's [set] in the 16th century". In May, Screen Daily officially reported that Thurman and Travis Fimmel would star in Tau Ceti 4, from an original screenplay, to be introduced to buyers by IMR International at that year's Cannes Film Festival. McTiernan was attached to produce alongside wife Gail Sistrunk, Anthony Katagas, and Thurman. The logline read: "A group of rebels set out to kill the oligarchs and military thugs who terrorize a war-torn planet in the remote Tau Ceti solar system." By December 2020, excerpts from an upcoming Empire magazine interview revealed that the film had been ready to begin principal photography in Serbia when the COVID-19 pandemic hit, and that McTiernan was considering changing the title. On September 15, 2022, journalist Sandra Benedetti posted a screen capture of McTiernan's concept art for the project on Twitter, revealing that the title had been changed to Tau Ceti Foxtrot. She explained that the previous title had misleadingly suggested it was the fourth film in a series, and added that the script had been completed for some time. Benedetti later elaborated:

"The script is multi-layered: clever, mysterious, feverish, tumultuous, and it's a real blast. The ending is astounding. Pure McTiernan. And that's all I'm allowed to say and show about it. McT is keen to keep his film a mystery until it's even started shooting."

At BIFFF that same month, McTiernan further described the film as a "A Fistful of Dollars on another planet", and said he hoped to begin filming in France that fall if all went according to plan. However, by 2023, the film was no longer in active development, though Geoffrey Macnab of The Guardian noted that the director was still "persevering" with it. In a 2025 interview, he mentioned wanting to shoot a science fiction film in the forests of Bilbao.

=== Doolittle ===
In November 2016, McTiernan revealed in China that he intended to make a World War II feature set there about the aftermath of the Doolittle bombing raid on Tokyo in 1942. André Morgan would have produced the film through Ruddy Morgan Organization. Shooting was expected to start in 2017.

== 2020s ==
=== Ghost in the Machine ===
In September 2022, journalist Sandra Benedetti tweeted that the second project McTiernan was developed alongside Tau Ceti Foxtrot was Ghost in the Machine, and that he was in Paris to polish the script with an unrevealed French co-writer. Concept art for the film drawn by McTiernan himself was also made public. The project was described as a "rich and intense" paranormal fantasy/thriller. Two months later, during a Q&A session at the Mar del Plata International Film Festival, McTiernan disclosed that he was visiting Argentina to see if his film could be shot there. In July 2023, Pablo Maillé of Usbek & Rica questioned McTiernan as to the status of Tau Ceti Foxtrot and Ghost in the Machine, to which he replied, "Actually, I have three films in mind. I'm working on all three at the same time, but we need funding. We recently received an offer for one of them, but I can't tell you more... We'll see."

=== Untitled Western film ===
When explained that his body of work is perceived as having qualities attributed to Westerns while at the Grossmann Fantastic Film and Wine Festival in July 2023, McTiernan said "I've never been able to make a Western, but I'd like to. I've wanted to do it for a long time and I hope I can. We'll see." That same week, he cited an undisclosed Western project among three scripts that he hoped to direct before he dies.

=== Untitled prison film ===
At NIFFF in October 2023, McTiernan expressed his desire to make a kind of social class drama; one that would specifically draw from his experience being imprisoned, the stories and testimonies of the inmates he interviewed while there, and the revelations he faced about his country. "If I could make a movie about that, I would, but nobody'll let me," he said. In a 2025 interview for Forbes Daily, McTiernan stated that he would publish the interviews as a book, rather than use them as the basis for a film. Asked if making his directorial comeback with a prison film would be timely, he answered, "Perhaps, possibly," but noted the genre's challenges. While acknowledging the economic appeal of prison films in the 1940s and 1950s—which were made cheaply—he remarked, "Prison movies are not fun, not for anyone, really. It's very very difficult to make an entertaining movie out of that. So I've never been really drawn to it." Though it was suggested that, after his incarceration, his next film would have a bleaker tone, McTiernan assured, "It'll be positive, but in a different way."

== Offers ==
Throughout his career, McTiernan has turned down various directing offers because he "didn't want to make the same movie again." Among the more notable films he's turned down are Speed, Batman Forever, Mission: Impossible and Terminator 3: Rise of the Machines.

When asked what film he would have liked to have done, McTiernan singled out Braveheart, explaining that he had in fact been offered it, though he was unaware of it at the time. "Mel Gibson asked me to do it, but he sent the writer over to talk to me," he said, referring to screenwriter Randall Wallace. "And the writer was a jackass. He was so full of himself, so pretentious, and never mentioned that Mel had asked that I direct the movie." Wallace apparently presented himself as though he were the producer, and McTiernan—assuming he was in charge—turned the film down. Only later did he learn that Gibson had wanted him as the director; a missed opportunity he came to regret.
