= Vatiswa Ndara =

South African actress

- Born: 28 September 1970 (age 55); Middelberg, South Africa
- Occupations: Actress, Broadcaster, Voice Artist, Host, Social Media Personality
- Years active: 1994 - present
- Notable work: Home Affairs, iGazi, Mfolozi Street & Muvhango
- Awards: Golden Horn Award for Best Supporting Actress in a TV Drama Series

Vatiswa Ndara (born 28 September 1970) is a South African actress and media personality.

== Early years and education ==
She was born in Middelberg which is located in the Eastern Cape province.

== Career ==
In 1994, she began her career as a news reader and compiler at Radio Transkei. She has also worked as a presenter at other radio stations including Radio Bob, Kaya FM, Metro FM, 5FM and Highveld Stereo. Her acting career began when she was offered the role of Ma'mfundisi in Generations. She has since starred in the television series Gaz'lam, Nomzamo, Home Affairs, Tsha Tsha, and Society. She appeared in the 2019 film Salvation.

== Filmography ==
- Generations
- Gaz'lam
- Nomzamo
- Home Affairs
- Society
- Shooting Stars
- 90 Plein Street
- Ihawu le Sizwe
- Muvhango
- Igazi
- Ithemba
- Tsha Tsha
- Society
- Salvation (2019 film)

== Open letter ==
On 8 October 2019, Ndara wrote a 6-page letter to Nathi Mthethwa, the arts and culture minister, which was posted on Twitter. In the letter, she alleged that Connie Ferguson and Shona Ferguson's company, Ferguson Films, mistreated actors in the entertainment industry. The letter went viral and sparked debates on the internet.

== Awards and recognition ==
- 2006: She won the inaugural SAFTA award for Best Supporting Actress
- 2008–2009: She was selected as a juror of the 2008 and 2009 International Emmy Awards. She judged in the category Best Performance by an Actress.
- 2016: She was nominated the Best Actress in a TV Comedy category for 2016 SAFTA.
- 2017: She received DStv's inaugural Mzansi Viewers' Choice Award for Favourite Actress.
