= Jessica Haines =

South African actress (born 1978)

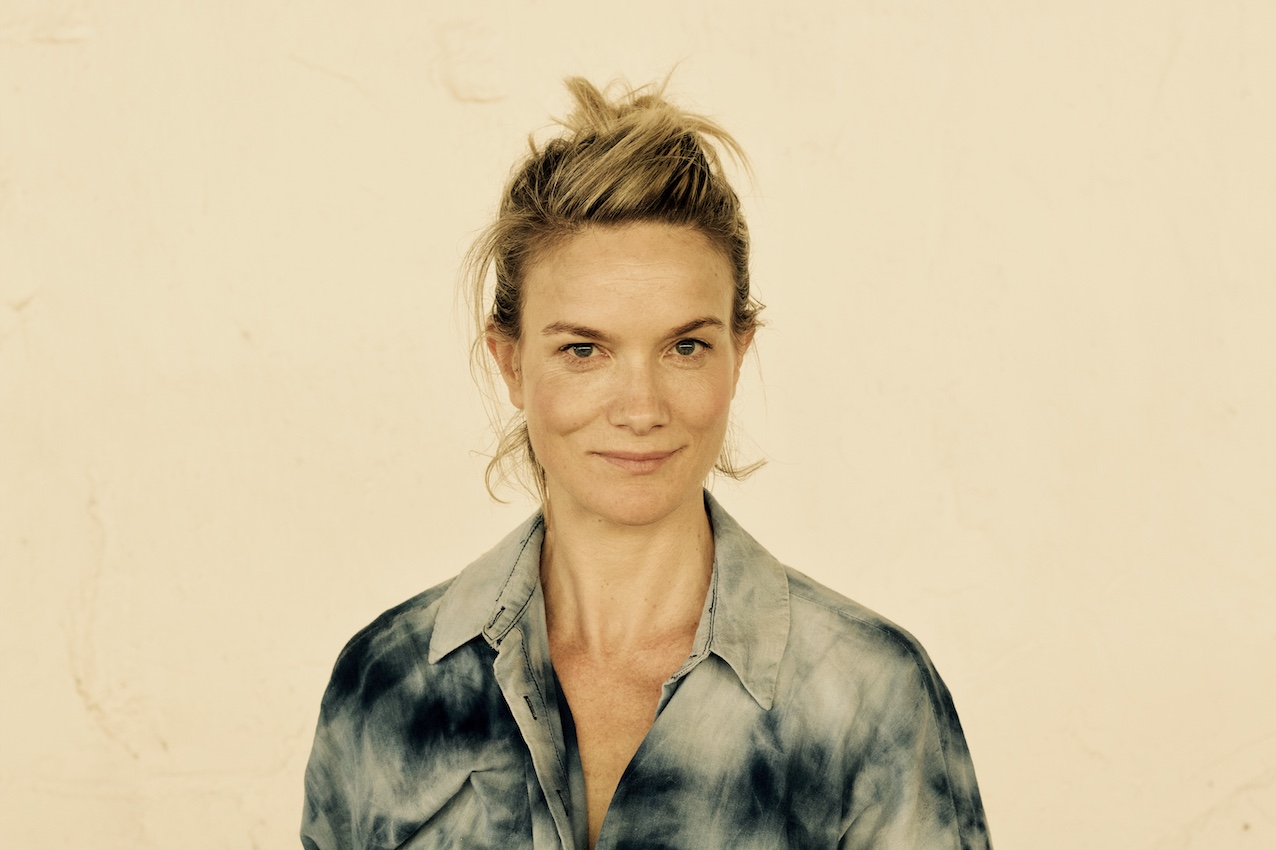
- Born: 11 December 1978 (age 47); Umtata, South Africa
- Education: University of Cape Town
- Occupation: Actress
- Years active: 2005–present
- Notable work: Disgrace
- Spouse: Richard Walker

Jessica Haines (born 1978) is a South African actress. She is best known for the 2008 film Disgrace in which she acts alongside John Malkovich. She frequently works in Johannesburg, Cape Town, Nairobi and Kampala. She is married to Richard Ancrum Walker; they have three children. After living in Tunisia for two years, they then moved to Nairobi, Kenya, where they lived for 8 years. They are now based in Kampala, Uganda.

== Early life and career ==
Jessica Haines was born in Umtata in the Eastern Cape of South Africa. She went to boarding school at Epworth School in Kwa-Zulu Natal in 1990. From a young age she had a love of the stage and did classical ballet and contemporary dance. She featured in a range of school arts programmes and participated as lead roles in musicals such as Brigadoon, Oklahoma and Fame. She won an arts scholarship in 1993 to carry on her studies at Epworth and in 1997 she was the first girl at Epworth to win her cultural honours. In 1998 she left KwaZulu-Natal to complete an honours degree at the University of Cape Town where she first studied English Literature, Drama and Social Anthropology. The following year she auditioned for a Bachelor of Arts in Theatre and Performance at U.C.T. and qualified at the end of 2001. Haines's professional career started in 2002.

== Filmography ==
Year	Film	Role	Notes
2003	"The Triangle" (miniseries, AMC)		
2005	Home Affairs	Katherine	
2008	Disgrace	Lucy	
2009	The Prisoner	No. 554	
2009	White Wedding	Daisy	directed by Jann Turner
2010	The Lost Future	Nina	(BBC film for television)
2010	The Bang Bang Club	Allie	(film directed by Steven Silver)
2011	Outcasts	Karina Hoban	(miniseries directed by Baraht Naruli for Kudos Films)
2012	Fynbos	Meryl	Directed by Harry Patramanis
2015	Cape Town	Hanna Nortier	Directed by Peter Ladkani
2018	"The Last Breath" (in production)	"Sue Scott"	Directed by Sam Benstead

2021 "Reyke" (T.V. Series) "Beth Tyrone" Directed by Zee Nthuli and Catherine Cooke

== Theater ==
- 2000 Bathezda Moon (Helen Martin) directed by Lara Bye
- 2001 PAX- (Domesticated woman) Directed by Jaquie Singer
- 2001 Blood Wedding Directed by Gefforey Hyland
- 2002 Worked for The Cape Youth Theatre Company
- 2003 Macbeth Lady Macbeth directed by Litsy Katzs for the On Que Theatre Company
- 2004 Worked for the On Que Theatre Company.
- 2007 Wolke (lead role), written by Harry Kalmer and directed by Henriette Gryfenberg
- 2018 Beautiful Outlaw, written by Jessica Waines and directed by James Cunningham (pre production)
