= To Have & to Hold (1996 film) =

- Directed by: John Hillcoat
- Written by: Gene Conkie
- Story by: Gene Conkie; John Hillcoat
- Produced by: Denise Patience
- Starring: Tchéky Karyo; Rachel Griffiths; Steve Jacobs
- Cinematography: Andrew de Groot
- Edited by: Stewart Young
- Music by: Blixa Bargeld; Nick Cave; Mick Harvey
- Production companies: Small Man Productions; Calypso Films; Film Finance Corporation Australia
- Distributed by: Palace Films
- Release date: 31 October 1996
- Running time: 99 minutes
- Country: Australia
- Language: English
- Box office: A$55,061 (Australia)

To Have & to Hold is a 1996 Australian thriller film directed by John Hillcoat and starring Tchéky Karyo, Rachel Griffiths and Steve Jacobs. It won an award at the 1997 ARIA Music Awards

The film was shot on location in New Guinea and Far North Queensland.

== Cast ==
- Tchéky Karyo as Jack
- Rachel Griffiths as Kate
- Steve Jacobs as Sal
- Anni Finsterer as Rose
- David Field as Stevie

== Soundtrack ==
The soundtrack to the film was composed by Blixa Bargeld, Nick Cave, and Mick Harvey. At the ARIA Music Awards of 1997 the album won Best Original Soundtrack, Cast or Show Album.

1. "To Have and to Hold" - 3:04
2. "The Jungle of Love" - 2:28
3. "Candlelit Bedroom" - 0:59
4. "Luther" - 0:55
5. "A House in the Jungle" - 1:14
6. "Delirium" - 0:45
7. "The River At Night" - 1:56
8. "Mourning Song" - 2:48
9. "Romantic Theme" - 3:41
10. "Snow Vision" - 1:26
11. "Rose" - 1:38
12. "The Clouds" - 0:48
13. "Noah's Funeral" - 0:54
14. "The Flight" - 1:43
15. "Kate Leaves" - 1:11
16. "We're Coming - The Riot" - 1:21
17. "Murder" - 1:16
18. "The Red Dress" - 1:26
19. "I Threw It All Away" (performed by Scott Walker, written by Bob Dylan) - 2:14
20. "To Have and to Hold - End Titles" - 3:49
21. "Gangster Bone" - 3:55
