= Lulu McClatchy =

Australian actress, singer and comedian

Lulu McClatchy is an Australian actress and comedian.

== Career ==
McClatchy started to write and perform her own shows at the Edinburgh Festival. She created the comedy show Supergirly and went on to present a slot on Live & Kicking. She also performed in her own sitcom, as well as performing with Elton John in the Australian leg of his 2002 tour. Supergirly also appeared at Just for Laughs in Montreal as well as a tour of the U.S. and Canada with host Harland Williams.

In 2005, McClatchy joined the cast of Neighbours as Genevieve "Eva" Doyle. She also plays the role of Bonnie in the film Aquamarine and Aunt Cassandra in Bogan Pride.

== Filmography ==
=== Film ===
Year	Title	Role	Notes
2006	Aquamarine	Bonnie	
2012	Not Suitable for Children	Jennifer	
2012	6 Plots	Nardine	
2013	The Sunset Six	Gayle	
2017	The Comet Kids	Teacher	
2018	That's Not My Dog!	Lulu	
2018	Trench	Krista West	
2020	The Very Excellent Mr. Dundee	Dorothy From Delaware	
2023	The Portable Door	Goblin / Londoner	

=== Television ===
Year	Title	Role	Notes
1991	Street Angels	Shop Assistant	Television film
1994–2005	Neighbours	Genevieve Eva Doyle / Karen	9 episodes
2000–2001	Live & Strictly	Supergirly Lou	10 episodes
2001	Children in Need	Supergirly Lou	2 episodes
2001	Supergirly	Supergirly Lou	8 episodes
2005	Blue Heelers	Crystal Moss	2 episodes
2008	Valentine's Day	Barassi	Television film
2008	Bogan Pride	Aunt Sandra	6 episodes
2008	The Elephant Princess	Nanek	2 episodes
2010	Offspring	Medical Trainer	Episode: "Re-Unravel"
2014	House Husbands	Kat	2 episodes
2015, 2016	Movement	Centrelink Lady	2 episodes
2019	Ms Fisher's Modern Murder Mysteries	Salon Manageress	Episode: "Just Murdered"
2019	Five Bedrooms	Maggie	Episode: "Five Lies"
2020	Remotely Funny	Supergirly	Episode #1.1
2021	Metro Sexual	Mystic Marlene	Episode: "Medical Students"
2021	Love Me	Patient	Episode #1.2
