= Steve Jacobs =

Australian film director

- Born: Sydney, New South Wales, Australia
- Occupations: Actor, producer, director
- Known for: Sky Trackers; R.F.D.S.
- Spouse: Anna Maria Monticelli

Steve Jacobs is an Australian actor and film director.

== Career ==
Jacob's debut role was in the television film Man of Letters in 1984. The same year he appeared in feature film Silver City. In 1985, Jacobs appeared in 4 episodes of TV medical drama A Country Practice and two more TV films. The next year he appeared in two miniseries, Alice to Nowhere and The Dirtwater Dynasty and feature films Echoes of Paradise (alongside Wendy Hughes) and Jilted (opposite Tina Bursill). After a guest role in the rebooted American Mission: Impossible series in 1988, he appeared in two more miniseries, The Magistrate and Cassidy and feature film Kokoda Crescent (all 1989).

Jacobs had early 1990s guest roles in long-running medical series G.P., anthology miniseries Seven Deadly Sins and drama thriller Snowy. He then starred in back-to-back roles in Australian children's science fiction adventure series Sky Trackers (1995) as Tony Masters and medical drama R.F.D.S., a Crawford Productions spin-off of long-running series The Flying Doctors – the roles he is perhaps best known for. He had 1990s television guest appearances in Blue Murder, Halifax f.p., One West Waikiki, Police Rescue, State Coroner, All Saints, Medivac, Wildside and Stingers. He also had roles in several films including Father (1990), Boys in the Island (both 1990), Rose Against the Odds (1991), To Have & to Hold (1996), Heart of Fire, The Well and Reprisal (all 1997).

Jacobs had further television guest roles into the 2000s, including White Collar Blue, Fergus McPhail, Blue Heelers, East West 101 and Bikie Wars: Brothers in Arms. He appeared in the 2000s TV movies Ihaka: Blunt Instrument and BlackJack: Sweet Science, as well as 2001 comedy feature The Man Who Sued God (alongside Billy Connolly).

Jacobs directed the movie La Spagnola (2001), which was written and produced by Anna Maria Monticelli. In 2008 he directed John Malkovich in a film adaptation of J. M. Coetzee's novel Disgrace, again produced and adapted by Monticelli. It premiered at the Toronto International Film Festival, where it won the Prize of the International Critics.

== Personal life ==
Jacobs is married to actress and producer Anna Maria Monticelli, with whom he starred in Sky Trackers.

== Filmography ==
=== Film ===
Year	Title	Role	Type
1984	Man of Letters	Hall	TV movie
1984	Silver City	Stefan	Feature film
1984	The Man You Know	Bob Proudfoot (voice)	Short film
1985	The Perfectionist	Lecturer	TV movie
1985	A Single Life	Richard Bennett	TV movie
1987	Echoes of Paradise	George	Feature film
1987	Jilted	Bob	Feature film
1988	Alterations	Michael	TV movie
1989	Kokoda Crescent	Detective	Feature film
1990	Father	Bobby Winton	Feature film
1990	Boys in the Island	Vern Miles	Feature film
1991	Swimming		Short film
1991	Rose Against the Odds	Frank Oakes	TV movie
1996	To Have & to Hold	Sal	Feature film
1997	Heart of Fire		TV movie
1997	The Well	Rod Bordern	Feature film
1997	Reprisal	Edwards	TV movie
2000	Ihaka: Blunt Instrument	Rourke	TV movie
2001	The Man Who Sued God	Hal	Feature film
2003	The Waltz	Jack	Short film
2004	BlackJack: Sweet Science	Blake	TV movie

=== Television ===
Year	Title	Role	Type
1985	A Country Practice	Russell Griffin	TV series, 4 episodes
1986	Alice to Nowhere	Dave Mitchell	TV miniseries, 2 episodes
1988	The Dirtwater Dynasty	Josh McCall	TV miniseries, 5 episodes
1988	Mission: Impossible	Stanton	TV series, season 1, episode 4: "The Condemned"
1989	The Magistrate	Wetherby	TV miniseries, 4 episodes
1989	Cassidy	Jensen	TV miniseries, 2 episodes
1992	G.P.	Mark	TV series, season 4, episode 37: "Chrysalis"
1993	Seven Deadly Sins		TV miniseries, episode 7: "Wrath"
1993	Snowy	George Blessed	TV miniseries, season 1, episode 8: "Song of the Siren"
1993–94	R.F.D.S.	Dr Jim Solomon	TV series, 13 episodes
1995	Sky Trackers	Tony Masters	TV series, 26 episodes
1995	Blue Murder	Detective Mal Rivers	TV miniseries, 2 episodes
1996	Halifax f.p.	William	TV series, season 2, episode 1: "Without Consent"
1996	One West Waikiki	William Stanley	TV series, season 2, episode 9: "The Romanoff Affair"
1996	Police Rescue	Captain Tarrant	TV series, season 5, episode 5: "The Ship"
1997	State Coroner	Chief Inspector Karl Devon	TV series, season 1, 2 episodes
1998	All Saints	Dr Harry Williams	TV series, season 1, 2 episodes
1998	Medivac	Parker	TV series, season 3, episode 10: "Boy Scout"
1999	Wildside	Frank Smith	TV series, season 2, episode 10
1999; 2002	Stingers	Kransky QC	TV series, seasons 2 & 5, 3 episodes
2002	White Collar Blue	Cable	TV movie
2004	Fergus McPhail	Jeremy Sylvester	TV series, season 1, episode 17: "The Act"
2004	Blue Heelers	Mike O'Grady	TV series, season 11, episode 16: "The Cull"
2011	East West 101	Deputy Police Commissioner	TV series, season 3, 3 episodes
2012	Bikie Wars: Brothers in Arms	Detective Masterson	TV miniseries, episode 4

== Awards ==
Year	Work	Award	Category	Result
1987	A Single Life	AFI Awards	Best Performance by an Actor in a Telefeature	Won
2002	La Spagnola	Mannheim-Heidelberg International Film Festival	Audience Award	Won
2002	La Spagnola	Mannheim-Heidelberg International Film Festival	Award of Independent Cinema Owners	Won
2008	Disgrace	Toronto International Film Festival	International Critics Award	Won
2009	Disgrace	Sydney Film Festival	Best Film	Nominated
2009	Disgrace	Granada Film Festival (Cines Del Sur)		Nominated
2009	Disgrace	Film Critics Circle of Australia Awards		Nominated
