= David Dennis (actor) =

South African actor

- Born: 17 May 1960 (age 65)
- Occupation: Actor
- Notable work: The World Unseen

David Dennis (born 17 May 1960) is a South African actor. He is best known for his role as Sol in the SABC 1 TV series Soul City. Dennis also played a significant role in the TV series Charlie Jade, as police detective Sew Sew Tukarrs. Dennis also played a terrorist Abasi Sawalha in Strike Back: Project Dawn - Season 2. In total, Dennis has had roles in thirteen different television series.

He has won many awards for his theatre, and musical theatre performances.

Dennis has appeared in seven feature films, including: Red Dust, 10,000 BC and Disgrace. He won Best Supporting Actor at the South African Film and Television Awards, in 2009, for his role as Jacob, in the feature film The World Unseen. Jonathan Curiel, in his review of The World Unseen, for the San Francisco Chronicle, considered that: "...veteran South African actor David Dennis...gives the kind of steady, engaging, nuanced performance that is a hallmark of any compelling feature film".

Dennis teaches acting at the Tshwane University of Technology.
