= Disgrace (2008 film) =

- Theatrical film poster
- Directed by: Steve Jacobs
- Screenplay by: Anna Maria Monticelli
- Based on: Disgrace by J. M. Coetzee
- Produced by: Steve Jacobs; Anna Maria Monticelli; Emile Sherman
- Starring: John Malkovich; Jessica Haines; Eriq Ebouaney
- Cinematography: Steve Arnold
- Edited by: Alexandre de Franceschi
- Music by: Antony Partos
- Release dates: 6 September 2008 (TIFF); 8 June 2009 (Australia)
- Running time: 120 minutes
- Country: Australia
- Languages: English; Afrikaans; Zulu; Xhosa
- Box office: $2.1 million

Disgrace is a 2008 Australian film, based on J. M. Coetzee's 1999 novel of the same name. It was adapted for the screen by Anna Maria Monticelli and directed by her husband Steve Jacobs. Starring American actor John Malkovich and South African newcomer Jessica Haines, it tells the story of a South African university professor in the post-apartheid era who moves to his daughter's Eastern Cape farm when his affair with a student costs him his position. The film received generally positive reviews.

== Plot summary ==
David Lurie (John Malkovich) is an ageing white professor teaching Romantic literature at an unnamed university in Cape Town shortly after the end of apartheid. David has an affair with one of his students, Melanie Isaacs (Antoinette Engel). University officials learn of the incident and bring David before a disciplinary board. David's colleagues offer him a quiet exit to save face, but he brashly affirms his guilt and refuses to admit wrongdoing, forcing the board to punish him more harshly.

David takes refuge with his daughter, Lucy (Jessica Haines), who owns a farm in the Eastern Cape. At first, the two experience harmony and Lurie finds peace with himself, though he grows suspicious of Lucy's farm manager, Petrus (Eriq Ebouaney). One day, David and Lucy are attacked by three men, who rape Lucy. David goes through a crisis, not knowing how to cope with his personal and family tragedies. He is also confused by the newfound guilt he suddenly feels about these rapes. In a movement toward penance, David goes back to his former student's home to beg for forgiveness from her and her family.

After a brief sojourn in Cape Town, he returns to the farm to find that Lucy is pregnant and that Petrus is steadily increasing his control over the property. One of the rapists has taken up residence with Petrus, and turns out to be his brother-in-law. Despite David's outrage, Lucy insists on not taking the matter to the authorities, and states that she will bear the child. Petrus offers to "marry" her and she agrees in order to come under his protection. David must come to terms with the new South Africa.

== Cast ==
- John Malkovich as David Lurie, a university professor
- Jessica Haines as Lucy Lurie, David's daughter, a farmer in the Eastern Cape
- Eriq Ebouaney as Petrus, a worker on Lucy's farm
- Fiona Press as Bev Shaw, head of an animal refuge
- Antoinette Engel as Melanie Isaacs, a university student
- David Dennis as Mr. Isaacs, Melanie's father
- Paula Arundell as Dr Farodia Rassool

== Reception ==
The film premiered at the 2008 Toronto International Film Festival, where it was awarded the Prize of the International Critics.

It received generally positive reviews in the media. For example, The Washington Post concluded that "Like the novel, the film goes where it must, not where the dictates of off-the-rack narrative compel it. Jacobs has made some smart choices, including tucking the novel's last scene into the body of the film, lessening its inevitable bathos if taken straight from page to screen. The anguishing confrontations between David and Lucy, David and the family of the woman he has wronged, David and Lucy's neighbors, and ultimately, between David and the reality of a modern South Africa, are as powerful here as in the book."

The film has an 83% favorable rating on Rotten Tomatoes, based on 60 votes. The critical consensus states that "Featuring outstanding performances from John Malkovich and newcomer Jessica Haines, Disgrace is a disturbing, powerful drama." The film holds an average score of 71/100 at Metacritic. It grossed $1,166,294 at the box office in Australia, and $2,122,574 worldwide.
