= Philip Hearnshaw =

Australian filmmaker (1952–2012)

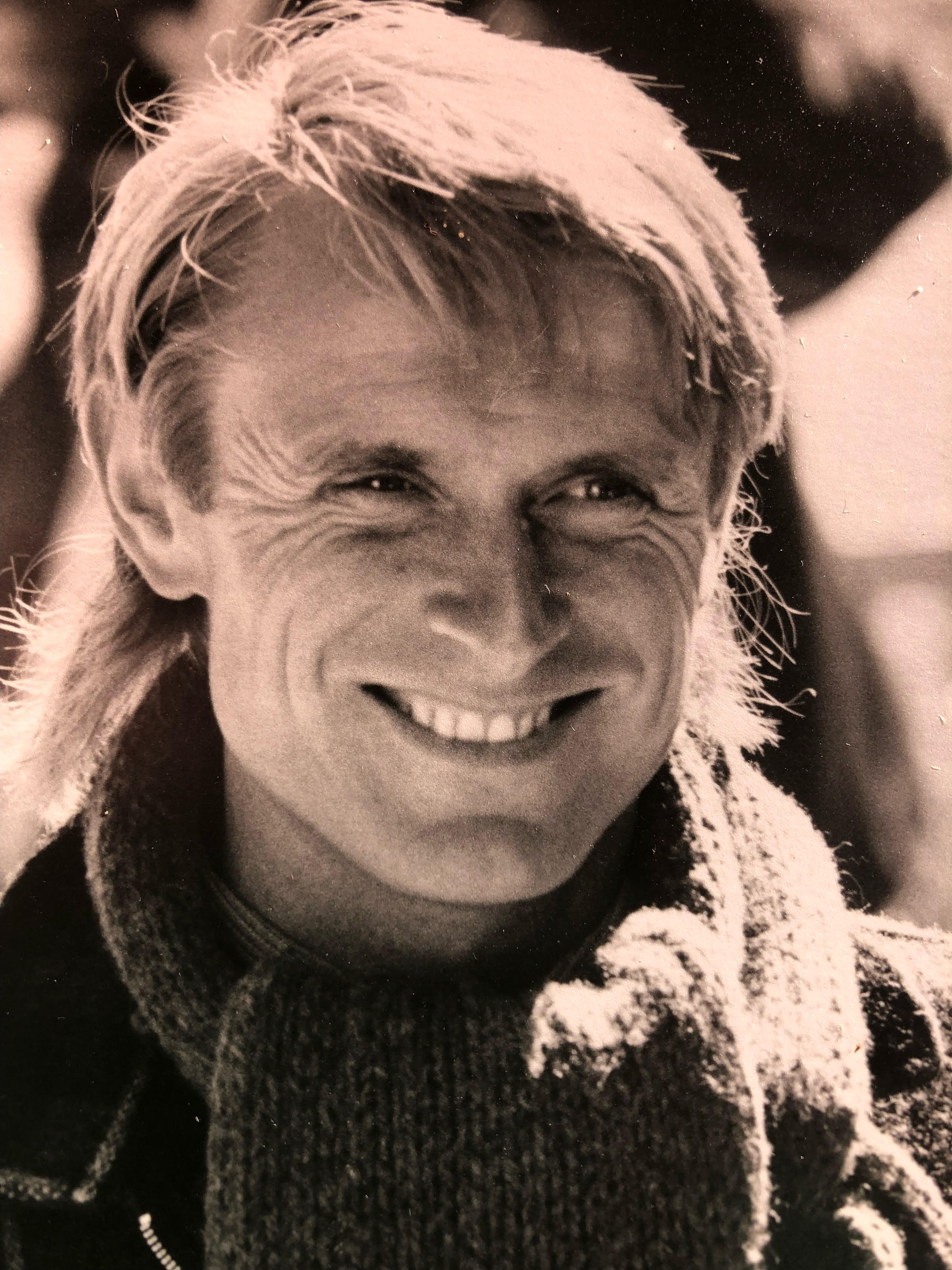
- Born: 29 December 1952; Sydney, Australia
- Died: 24 July 2012 (aged 59); Australia
- Occupations: Assistant director, Film producer

Philip Hearnshaw (29 December 1952 – 24 July 2012) was an Australian filmmaker who made a number of films with George Miller and Doug Mitchell.

== Early life and education ==
Philip was one of four children to parents Eric Hearnshaw, an Australian politician, and Marion Hearnshaw, a nurse and independent and liberal party candidate.

Hearnshaw was educated at Kinross Wolaroi and Normanhurst Boys High. He attended the Macquarie University graduating with a bachelor of arts, communication and media.

== Career ==
Hearnshaw's career spanned over 30 years, beginning in 1977 as a production assistant on The Last Wave. Much of his later work focused around animation and motion capture.

He was a producer on La Spagnola, Babe, and Happy Feet, and as executive producer on Happy Feet 2. He also worked extensively as a first assistant director from 1980 until 2005, making over 20 films and television series.

Throughout the 1990s, Hearnshaw lectured in film and TV at the Australian Film, Television and Radio School in Sydney, Australia.

== Awards and nominations ==
Hearnshaw was both a producer and first assistant director on the film Babe which won a Golden Globe Award for Best Motion Picture in 1995.

La Spagnola was submitted to the 74th Academy Awards as the Australian submission for Best Foreign Language film, but was not accepted as a nominee.

Happy Feet won an Academy Award and a BAFTA in 2006.

In 2007, the Directors Guild of Australia presented Hearnshaw with an inaugural career achievement award for his work as a first assistant director.

Hearnshaw was executive producer on Happy Feet 2. The film was nominated for Best Animated Feature Film at the Asia Pacific Screen Awards in 2012.

In 2011 at Hearnshaw's retirement, George Miller presented him with a plaque with a Hollywood star that read: ''Philip Hearnshaw: Producer, 1st Assistant Director, Protagonist, Filmmaker. In recognition of a lifetime of championing the screen industry, both local and global.''

== Personal life and death ==
While working in the UK as an assistant editor at the BBC, Hearnshaw met Patsy Buchan, a registered nurse, and the couple had a daughter Juno in 1976.

Philip then met Catherine Griff in 1985 who worked at the Australian Film Commission. Hearnshaw and Griff were married in 1988. Together they raised their son Dean.

In 2007 Hearnshaw was diagnosed with motor neuron disease. Following a five-year battle with the illness, he died on 24 July 2012.

== Filmography ==
Year	Title	Notes
2006	Happy Feet	Associate producer, 1st assistant director: Motion Capture
2011	Happy Feet Two	Executive producer
