= Bogan Pride =

Australian comedy television series

- Created by: Rebel Wilson
- Directed by: Tony Ayers
- Starring: Rebel Wilson
- Theme music composer: Michael Lira
- Country of origin: Australia
- Original language: English
- No. of seasons: 1
- No. of episodes: 6

Production
- Production location: Sunshine College West Campus
- Camera setup: Single
- Running time: Approx. 25 minutes
- Production companies: Big & Little Films

Original release
- Network: SBS TV
- Release: 6 October – 10 November 2008

Bogan Pride is an Australian comedy television series which first screened on SBS TV in 2008; the six-part series was both created by and starred Rebel Wilson. The series centred on the life of a teenage bogan girl.

== Synopsis ==
Jennie Cragg (Rebel Wilson) is an overweight girl who lives in Boonelg with her morbidly obese mother Berenice, who is now confined to her living-room chair. Her Aunty Cassandra’s gay husband has left her. Nick is the extremely good-looking neighbour, and Jennie's best friends are hypochondriac Nigella and the extremely religious Amy Lee. Jennie enters a dance competition to pay for her mum’s stomach stapling operation, attempts to impress the boy she has a crush on and get revenge on the school skanks.

== Cast ==
- Rebel Wilson as Jennie Cragg
- Sally Anne Upton as Berenice Cragg
- Lulu McClatchy as Aunt Cassandra
- Fanny Hanusin as Amy Lee
- Alice Ansara as Nigella
- Ryan Jones as Nick
- Natasha Cunningham as Tracy
- Kate Jenkinson as Tizzneen
- Janine Atwill as Tessa
- Caroline Lee as Erin
- Wilhelmina Stracke as Gaylene
- Tim Stitz as Jimmy
- Darren Amor as Stevie
- Audra Hopgood as Marilyn
- Leanne Courtney as Susan
- Brian Mannix as Burt Cragg
- Adam Zwar as Mr Laffer

== Production ==
In 2008 Wilson created and wrote the musical comedy series Bogan Pride which was picked up for six episodes by SBS One. .

Most of the furniture/house items and clothing were bought from charity shops. And food is bought from Aldi.

Each episode was written by Wilson, directed by Peter Templeman and produced by Tony Ayres and Michael McMahon (Home Song Stories, Walking on Water).

The show was not renewed for a second season.

== See also ==
- List of Australian television series
