= Middleburgh =

Middleburgh may refer to:

- Middleburgh, New York, a town in Schoharie County, New York, United States
  - Middleburgh (village), New York, within the town of Middleburgh

== See also ==
- Middleburg (disambiguation)
