= Home Affairs (TV series) =

- Genre: Soap opera & Drama
- Created by: Roberta Durrant
- Written by: Catherine Stewart; Minky Schlesinger; Natalie Harrhoff
- Starring: Antonio Lyons; Bonnie Mbuli; Brenda Ngxoli; Eduan van Jaarsveldt; Helene Truter; Jessica Haines; Lali Dangazele; Makgano Mamabolo; Masello Motana; Nomsa Xaba; Nthati Moshesh; Sorisha Naidoo; Therese Benade; Vatiswa Ndara; Yonela Duze
- Country of origin: South Africa
- Original languages: English; Xhosa; Zulu

Production
- Running time: 60 minutes (incl. commercials)

Original release
- Network: SABC 1
- Release: 10 August 2005 – 2010

Home Affairs was a South African television drama series created and produced by Roberta Durrant. It told the story of nine very different women whose lives are interconnected. The women's stories reflected the wide cultural range of South African women. The women each undertook a journey of self-discovery, connecting with each other in various and random ways.

== Cast ==
- Lerato Moloisane
- Nthati Moshesh
- Brenda Ngxoli
- Yonela Duze
- Bonnie Mbuli
- Sorisha Naidoo
- Therese Benade
- Jessica Haines
- Andrea Dondolo
- Vatiswa Ndara
- Nomsa Xaba
- Masello Motana
- Makgano Mamabolo
- Lali Dangazele
- Mbali Ntuli
- Antonio Lyons
