= La Spagnola (film) =

2001 film by Steve Jacobs

- Film poster
- Directed by: Steve Jacobs
- Written by: Anna Maria Monticelli
- Produced by: Anna Maria Monticelli; Philip Hearnshaw
- Starring: Lola Marceli; Alice Ansara
- Cinematography: Steve Arnold
- Edited by: Alexandre de Franceschi
- Music by: Cezary Skubiszewski
- Production company: Wild Strawberries
- Distributed by: New Vision Films
- Release date: 20 September 2001
- Running time: 87 minutes
- Country: Australia
- Languages: Spanish; English; Italian
- Box office: $477,197

La Spagnola ([la spaɲˈɲɔːla], Italian: "The Spanish Woman") is a 2001 comedy drama Australian film directed by Steve Jacobs. It was Australia's submission to the 74th Academy Awards for the Academy Award for Best Foreign Language Film, but was not accepted as a nominee.

== Cast ==
- Lola Marceli as Lola
- Alice Ansara as Lucia
- Helen Thomson as Wendy
- Alex Dimitriades as Stefano
- Simon Palomares as Ricardo
- Christopher Truswell as Butcher

== Synopsis ==
Lola is a fiery Spanish wife and mother living in small-town sixties Australia. When her husband leaves her for a young blonde, taking their life savings with him, and her teenage daughter begins to rebel against her strict rules, Lola comes into her own.

== Box office ==
La Spagnola grossed $477,197 at the box office in Australia.

== See also ==
- Cinema of Australia
- List of submissions to the 74th Academy Awards for Best Foreign Language Film
