= Silver City (1984 film) =

- DVD cover
- Directed by: Sophia Turkiewicz
- Screenplay by: Thomas Keneally; Sophia Turkiewicz
- Story by: Sophia Turkiewicz
- Produced by: Joan Long
- Starring: Gosia Dobrowolska; Ivar Kants; Anna Jemison; Steve Bisley; Debra Lawrance
- Cinematography: John Seale
- Edited by: Don Saunders
- Music by: William Motzing
- Release date: 1984
- Running time: 101 min
- Country: Australia
- Language: English
- Budget: AU$2.3 million
- Box office: AU$197,839 (Australia)

Silver City is a 1984 Australian film about post-war Polish immigration to Australia, following World War II. "Silver City" is the nickname of an immigration hostel in Australia. David Stratton called it one of the best Australian films of the 1980s and thought that it should have made Gosia Dobrowolska a major star.

== Cast ==
- Gosia Dobrowolska as Nina
- Ivar Kants as Julian
- Anna Jemison as Anna
- Steve Bisley as Viktor
- Debra Lawrance as Helena
- Ewa Bok as Mrs. Bronowska
- Tim McKenzie as Mr. Roy
- Richard Morgan as Dan
- Joel Cohen as Young Daniel
- Dennis Miller as Max
- Annie Byron as Dorothy
- Halina Abramowicz as Ella
- Steve Jacobs as Stefan
- Noel Hodda as Estonian man
- Ian Gilmour as Barman

== Production ==
Sophia Turkiewicz had long been interested in making a film about post war migrants to Australia. She attended the Australian Film and Television School in Sydney where she made a short drama Letters from Poland about a Polish refugee. She started writing the film in 1978 while studying in Poland, originally concentrating on a ship full of Polish refugees going to Australia, then focusing on what happened when they arrived. She sent an outline to Joan Long who agreed to produce. After Turkiewicz did five drafts, Long then suggested a co-writer be brought on board and Thomas Keneally - who had visited Poland as part of his research for Schindler's Ark - became involved.

During the early 1980s Long and Turkiewicz became frustrated at the progress of getting up the film and for a time developed another project, Time's Raging based on stories by Frank Moorhouse but eventually went back to Silver City. The money was eventually raised through 10BA tax concessions.

Gosia Dobrowolska, who had newly arrived in Australia, auditioned for the lead and impressed despite not knowing any English. However she struggled at a reading of the script and the role was given to Megan Williams instead. Then there was a delay in financing which put the film back a year. Dobrowolska improved her English and impressed the director and producer in a play she was appearing in; Williams was let go and Dobrowolska was cast. (Williams later sued and the matter settled out of court.)

Andrzej Seweryn and Sam Neill were candidates to play the male lead before Ivar Kants was cast. Shooting began in October 1983 and went for seven weeks.

== Awards ==
- Sydney Critic's Circle award for Best Feature Film of the year .
- AFI award – Steve Bisley for Best Supporting Actor
- AFI award – Anna Maria Monticelli for Best Actress in a Supporting Role.
- AFI award – for Costume Design

== Box office ==
Silver City grossed $197,839 at the box office in Australia, which is equivalent to $502,003 in 2009 dollars.

== Novelization ==
Concurrent with the release of the film, Penguin Books Australia issued a paperback novelization of the screenplay by American-Australian novelist Sara Dowse. The book was distributed in Australia, New Zealand, the UK and North America.

== See also ==
- The True Believers, a miniseries where Ron Blanchard reprises his role as Arthur Calwell
