= Middleburg, Seneca County, Ohio =

Coordinates: 41°14′04″N 83°15′16″W

Middleburg is an extinct town in Seneca County, in the U.S. state of Ohio.

== History ==
Middleburg was platted in 1832.
