= Alice Ansara =

Australian actress and dramaturg

- Born: 1982 (age 43–44); Australia
- Occupations: Actress, radio presenter

Alice Ansara (born 1982) is an Australian actress working in film, television, and theatre, and as a radio presenter for the Australian Broadcasting Corporation.

== Early life and education ==
Alice Ansara was born in 1982, the daughter of documentary filmmaker Martha Ansara, who arrived in Australia from the US in 1969, and a father who was already married with another family. She has two half-siblings, each born ten years apart.

She trained in acting at the Western Australian Academy of Performing Arts (WAAPA).

== Career ==
Ansara's first significant role was as young Cathy Ann in the award-winning Australian telemovie Breaking Through. She continued to work professionally across film and television into her adolescence.

Before finishing high school, Ansara landed the lead role of Lucia in the 2001 Australian film La Spagnola, which debuted at the Sydney Film Festival and garnered her Best Actress nominations at the 2001 Australian Film Institute Awards (now AACTA Awards) and the 2002 Film Critics Circle of Australia Awards.

After graduating from WAAPA, Ansara starred in the film Rosebery 7470 for which she won a Best Actress Award at the 2006 Melbourne Underground Film Festival. She also began working in theatre, including with leading Australian companies: Sydney Theatre Company, Griffin Theatre Company, Monkey Baa Theatre. and Bell Shakespeare. In 2009 Ansara was chosen by artistic directors Cate Blanchett and Andrew Upton as one of nine actors in the Sydney Theatre Company's acting ensemble known as "The Residents".

Ansara was part of the core cast of the TV comedy series Bogan Pride, playing Rebel Wilson's best friend Nigella. She has played various characters, including Lamees, in the first two seasons of Nazeem Hussain's television sketch comedy Legally Brown.

She has been a member of Actors Equity since 1989 and has served on the Management Committee of the Actors Benevolent Fund.

Ansara has directed two short documentaries in Auslan for The Deaf Society of NSW, including Jacobs Story, commissioned by the Australian Human Rights Commission. She has also served as a member of the society's Centenary History sub-committee in the creation of the website Deaf in New South Wales: a Community History.

In 2013 she received a Mike Walsh Fellowship to study deaf theatre practices in Scandinavia.

Ansara is a member of the Film & Broadcast Industries Oral History Group associated with Australia's National Film and Sound Archive, for whom she records oral histories of Australian actors.

As a radio presenter and podcaster Alice moved from the Community Broadcasting Association of Australia to the Australian Broadcasting Corporation to host the Saturday breakfast program for ABC South East NSW.

== Personal life ==
Ansara has two daughters.

== Filmography ==
=== Film ===
Year	Title	Role	Notes
1993	Gino	Girl	
1997	She’s Not Very Beautiful	Jane (lead)	Short film
1997	The One That Got Away	Maria (lead)	Short film
2000	La Spagnola	Lucia (lead)	Feature film Best Actress Nomination at AFI Awards, FCCC Awards
2005	Rosebery 7470	Alison (lead)	Won Best Actress Award at MUFF Awards
2006	Meditations on a Name	Wattle (lead)	Short film
2007	Sexy, Single, Bilingual	Zoya (lead)	Short film
2008	The Ballad of Betty & Joe	Betty (lead)	Short film
2008	The Ladies Lounge	Layla (lead)	Short film Won Queer Perspective Award at Sydney Queer Film Festival
2010	Nude Study	Alison	
2014	Shock Room	Lana	Documentary film Won Best Feature Documentary at Antenna Documentary Film Festival
2016	Video Report	Susie (lead)	
2017	Deep Storage	Sylvia (lead)	Short film Won Audience Award for Best Short Film at Bentonville Film Festival
2017	Beyond the Bubble	Denise	Short film
2018	Judy and Punch	Alice	Feature film

=== Television ===
Year	Title	Role	Notes
1990	Breaking Through	Young Ann	TV movie
1990	Death Duties	Sophie	
1997	The Teenage Guide to Popularity	Amy	
2007	All Saints	Detective Grant	
2008	Bogan Pride	Nigella	
2010	My Place	Mrs Stockton	Anthology series
2013–2014	Legally Brown	Lamees / various	Season 1–2
2015	Moonman	Mum	
2017	Newton's Law	Carla	
2019	Doctor Doctor	Green Annie	
2023	Bump	Convenor	
2024	Black Snow	Mandy Neilson	
2026	Dustfall	Shayna Griffin	Miniseries

== Theatre ==
Year	Title	Role	Company
2002	Three Sisters	Olga	WAAPA
2002	A Midsummer Night's Dream	Titania	WAAPA
2003	Pericles	Gower	WAAPA
2003	The Innocent Mistress	Mrs Flywife	WAAPA
2005	Pearlie in the Park	Mrs Possum	Monkey Baa
2006	The Merchant of Venice	Jessica	Bell Shakespeare
2008	Arabian Nights	Fatima	Griffin Stablemates
2009	The Mysteries: Genesis	Lucifer / Abel	Sydney Theatre Company
2009	The Seagull	The Seagull	Screw Theatre Company
2010	Leviathan	Caroline Chisolm	Sydney Theatre Company
2010	Vs Macbeth	Lennox	Sydney Theatre Company
2010	The Oresteia	Chorus	Sydney Theatre Company
2010	The Comedy of Errors	Adriana	Sydney Theatre Company
2011	One for the Ugly Girls	Claire	505 Theatre
2012	Look the Other Way	Ensemble	Sydney Theatre Company / BYDS
2013	The Other Way	Mara	Sydney Theatre Company / BYDS
2014	Jump for Jordan	Sophia	Griffin Theatre Company
2015	I Call My Brothers	Ahlem / Tyra	Melbourne Theatre Company
2015	The Naked Self	Guide	Auspicious Arts Projects
2018	Contest	C	Darebin Arts
2022	The Sirens Return	Pearl	Merrigong Theatre

== Radio ==
Year	Title	Role	Notes
2015	Going and Going	Laila	ABC Radio National
