= 2002 Academy Awards =

2002 Academy Awards may refer to:

- 74th Academy Awards, the Academy Awards ceremony that took place in 2002
- 75th Academy Awards, the 2003 ceremony honoring the best in film for 2002
