= John McTiernan =

American filmmaker (born 1951)

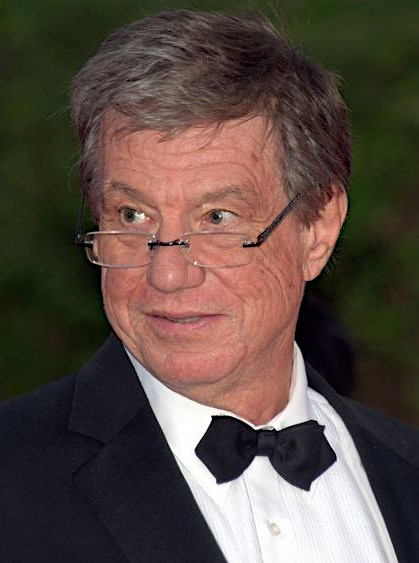
- McTiernan in 2014 at the Deauville American Film Festival
- Born: John Campbell McTiernan Jr. January 8, 1951 (age 75); Albany, New York, U.S.
- Education: Juilliard School (BFA); American Film Institute (MFA)
- Occupations: Film director; producer
- Years active: 1986–2003, 2017
- Spouses: Carol Land (m. 1974; div. 1984); Donna Dubrow (m. 1988; div. 1997); Kate Harrington (m. 2003; div. 2012); Gail Sistrunk (m. 2012)
- Children: 3

John Campbell McTiernan Jr. (born January 8, 1951) is an American film director, producer and writer best known for his work in the action film genre. His films include Predator (1987), Die Hard (1988), The Hunt for Red October (1990), Last Action Hero (1993), The Thomas Crown Affair and The 13th Warrior (both 1999).

His career was hamstrung in the mid-2000s after unknowingly lying to an FBI investigator; a crime he pleaded guilty for in 2006. The judgment was vacated, after which he pleaded guilty in 2007 to the original charge and an additional charge of perjury, in regard to his hiring of the private investigator Anthony Pellicano in late 2000 to illegally wiretap the phone calls of two people, one of whom was Charles Roven, a co-producer of his action film remake Rollerball (2002).

He was incarcerated in federal prison from April 2013 to February 2014. During his imprisonment, he filed for bankruptcy amidst foreclosure proceedings for his large ranch residence. He was considered persona non grata in the Hollywood industry, and was not subsequently hired by another studio to direct a feature film. In 2017, he briefly returned to directing with two advertisements for the video game Tom Clancy's Ghost Recon Wildlands.

== Early life and education ==
McTiernan was born in Albany, New York, the son of Myra and John Campbell McTiernan Sr., a lawyer and actor. He is of Irish and English ancestry; personal research revealed that his paternal ancestors emigrated to America during the Great Famine, while on his mother's side he is descended from Mayflower passengers. He attended the Juilliard School before graduating with a Master of Fine Arts from the AFI Conservatory in 1975. McTiernan is an alum from SUNY Old Westbury.

== Career ==
=== 1980s ===
In 1986, McTiernan wrote and directed his first feature film, Nomads, starring Pierce Brosnan in his first lead film role. It was not well received by critics, receiving 36% on the review aggregator site Rotten Tomatoes. Roger Ebert of the Chicago Sun-Times rated it 1.5 stars out of four and said that even if viewers cared about the characters, the film is too confusing to understand. Variety wrote, "Nomads avoids the more obvious ripped-guts devices in favor of dramatic visual scares. [...] In fact, everything seems to come naturally in a tale that even has the supernatural ring true." Walter Goodman of The New York Times called the Innuat "as menacing as the chorus from West Side Story". In his memoir, Total Recall, Arnold Schwarzenegger said he was so impressed by the film's tense atmosphere made with a low budget that he hired McTiernan to direct Predator.

The budget for sci-fi Predator was around $15m. It opened as #1 at the U.S. box office with a gross of $12m on just its opening weekend, and went on to gross nearly $100m overall. Initial critical reaction to Predator was negative, with criticism focusing on the thin plot. Metacritic, which assigns a score out of 100 to reviews, rates the film with an average score of 45 based on 15 reviews, with the review opinions summarized as "mixed". Elvis Mitchell of The New York Times described it as "grisly and dull, with few surprises". Dean Lamanna wrote in Cinefantastique that "the militarized monster movie tires under its own derivative weight." Variety wrote that the film was a "slightly above-average actioner that tries to compensate for tissue-thin plot with ever-more-grisly death sequences and impressive special effects." In subsequent years critics' attitudes toward the film warmed, and it has appeared on "best of" lists. The review aggregator site Rotten Tomatoes reports that 80% of 60 surveyed critics gave the film a positive review.

Made on a $28 million budget, Die Hard grossed over $140 million theatrically worldwide. It is considered one of the greatest action films. The film's success spawned a Die Hard franchise, which so far has included four sequels, video games, and a comic book. It received very high ratings from critics. English film critic Mark Kermode expressed admiration for the film, calling it an exciting setup of "Cowboys and Indians in The Towering Inferno". The film has been included in various top-ten lists of best Christmas movies, including Empire (rating it #1), Entertainment Weekly (rating it #4), Forbes (rating it #1), The Guardian (rating it #8), and San Francisco Gate (rating it #1). However, not every critic praised it. Roger Ebert gave it a mere two stars out of four and criticized the stupidity of the deputy police chief character Dwayne T. Robinson (played by Paul Gleason), saying that "all by himself he successfully undermines the last half of the movie".

=== 1990–1995 ===
The Hunt for Red October also received positive reviews from critics. Nick Schager, for Slant Magazine, called the film "a thrilling edge-of-your-seat trifle that has admirably withstood the test of time". Ebert called it "a skillful, efficient film that involves us in the clever and deceptive game being played", while Gene Siskel commented on the film's technical achievement and Baldwin's convincing portrayal of the character Jack Ryan.

McTiernan directed Medicine Man (1992), about a medical researcher in a rainforest, starring Sean Connery. Medicine Man was poorly received. Roger Ebert gave it one-and-a-half stars, saying that although the film had "some beautiful moments", it never really came together and had "a cornball conclusion". Entertainment Weekly said the story was "built around some very tired devices" and especially criticized the performance of the female lead.

In 1993, he directed and co-produced Last Action Hero, an action-comedy vehicle for Arnold Schwarzenegger. The film received mixed to negative reviews from critics. Entertainment Weekly said it was "a stupid, generic slab of action bombast that keeps reminding us it's a stupid, generic slab of action bombast" and called it "a lead balloon of a movie". Variety called it a "a joyless, soulless machine of a movie, an $80 million-plus mishmash". Vincent Canby likened the film to "a two-hour Saturday Night Live sketch" and called it "something of a mess, but a frequently enjoyable one". Roger Ebert gave the film 2.5 stars out of 4, writing that despite some entertaining moments Last Action Hero more often "plays more like a bright idea than like a movie that was thought through".

In 1995, McTiernan rebounded with Die Hard with a Vengeance, the third installment of the Die Hard film series. It was highly successful – garnering $366m in box office receipts and becoming the highest-grossing film of the year, although the film had mixed reviews by critics. Owen Gleiberman of Entertainment Weekly said that while "McTiernan stages individual sequences with great finesse... they don't add up to a taut, dread-ridden whole." James Berardinelli said the explosions and fights were "filmed with consummate skill, and are thrilling in their own right." Desson Howe of The Washington Post said "the best thing about the movie is the relationship between McClane and Zeus", saying that Samuel L. Jackson was "almost as good as he was in Pulp Fiction".

Ebert gave the film a positive review, praising the action sequences and the performances of Willis, Jackson, and Jeremy Irons, concluding: "Die Hard with a Vengeance is basically a wind-up action toy, cleverly made, and delivered with high energy. It delivers just what it advertises, with a vengeance." Empire magazine's Ian Nathan gave the film a 3/5-star review stating that "Die Hard With A Vengeance is better than Die Hard 2, but not as good as the peerless original. Though it's breathless fun, the film runs out of steam in the last act. And Jeremy Irons' villain isn't fit to tie Alan Rickman's shoelaces."

=== Later career ===
From 1995 to 1997, McTiernan was a producer for several smaller projects, including at least three films that were not major releases – The Right to Remain Silent (a made-for-television film), Amanda, and Quicksilver Highway (a made-for-television film).

During 1997 he also directed The 13th Warrior (belatedly released August 27, 1999), a loose retelling of the tale of Beowulf starring Antonio Banderas, Diane Venora and Omar Sharif that was adapted from the novel Eaters of the Dead by Michael Crichton. The film did poorly at the box office, with a total loss estimated at $70–130 million. It received generally mixed-to-poor reviews. Roger Ebert gave the film one and a half stars out of four, saying that it "lumber[s] from one expensive set-piece to the next without taking the time to tell a story that might make us care." Conversely, James Berardinelli gave it three stars out of four, calling it "a solid offering" that "delivers an exhilarating 100 minutes". The outcome disappointed Sharif so much that he temporarily retired from film acting, saying "After my small role in The 13th Warrior, I said to myself, 'Let us stop this nonsense, these meal tickets that we do because it pays well.'" Sharif said it was "terrifying to have to do the dialogue from bad scripts, to face a director who does not know what he is doing, in a film so bad that it is not even worth exploring."

The Thomas Crown Affair, also directed by McTiernan – a heist-film remake from the Norman Jewison original, starring Pierce Brosnan and Rene Russo (instead of Steve McQueen and Faye Dunaway – the latter performing a small part in the remake as Crown's psychiatrist), which opened to solid reviews and strong box office results, was released earlier the same month (August 6, 1999).

McTiernan then directed the 2002 film Rollerball, a science fiction remake starring Chris Klein, Jean Reno, and LL Cool J. The second remake in a row of a Norman Jewison's film to be directed by McTiernan, Rollerball was panned by critics. Time Out's Trevor Johnson described it as "a checklist shaped by a 15-year-old mallrat: thrashing metal track, skateboards, motorbikes, cracked heads and Rebecca Romijn with her top off", and Ebert called it "an incoherent mess, a jumble of footage in search of plot, meaning, rhythm and sense". The film was a box-office flop, earning a worldwide total of $26m compared to a production budget of $70m. In 2014, the Los Angeles Times listed the film as one of the most expensive box office flops of all time.

As of 2026, his most recent feature film project was the 2003 thriller Basic with John Travolta and Samuel L. Jackson. The film was another box-office bomb for McTiernan, and reviews were mostly negative. Roger Ebert gave it one star out of four, saying it was "not a film that could be understood" and that "If I were to see it again and again, I might be able to extract an underlying logic from it, but the problem is, when a movie's not worth seeing twice, it had better get the job done the first time through." Leonard Maltin's Movie Guide gave it two stars out of four and said the film "keeps adding layers of confusion so that it becomes less interesting as it goes along! The final 'twist' seems to negate the entire story, like a bad shaggy-dog joke."

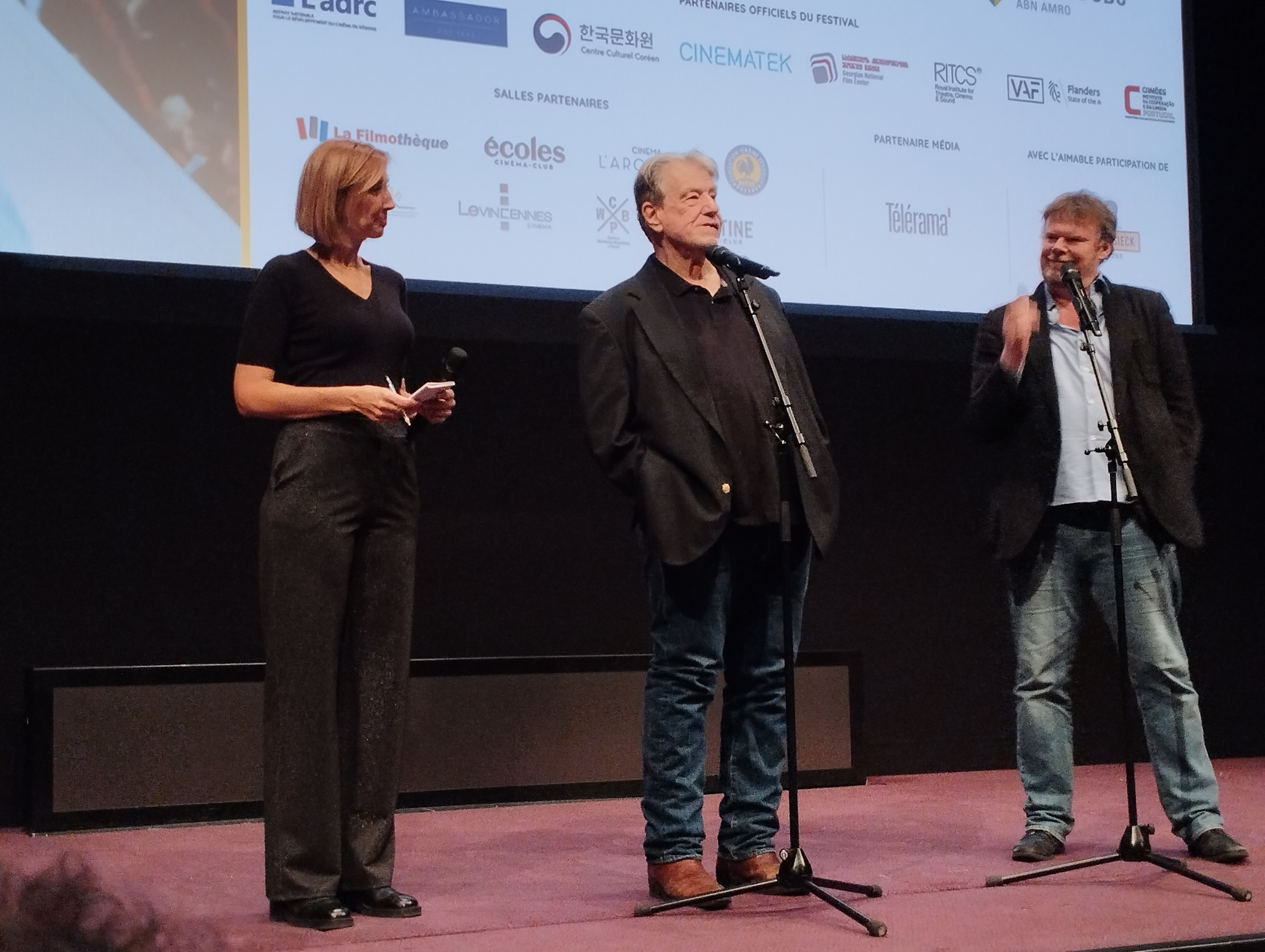
McTiernan (middle) speaking at a film retrospective of his work in 2025

After three consecutive critical and box-office failures, followed by the 2006 criminal charges which saw him spend time in prison, in addition to civil lawsuits and bankruptcy, McTiernan was rendered unemployable in the United States because he could not be insured. Two short films which he directed—The Red Dot and Ruthless—were released by Ubisoft to advertise the 2017 video game Tom Clancy's Ghost Recon Wildlands, and marked his first narrative project in fourteen years. In a 2024 interview, he stated that it had been his choice to not get involved with directing again, blaming the failures of his last feature films on scripts he could not fix, and announced that he had since been focusing his time on uncredited script doctoring.

In 2025, McTiernan confirmed his attempts to direct again: "Yes, there are four films that I desperately want to do, and one of them may be in the works," but did not reveal exact details out of superstition. However, he added, "this particular film... what we're going to do is announce that we're going to make it, after we've been shooting for a month." Previously, when pressed about these unrevealed projects, he said "one of them is a science fiction film, one is a Western, and one is a love story."

== Legal issues ==
=== Criminal charges, felony conviction, and incarceration ===
On April 3, 2006, McTiernan was charged in federal court with making a false statement to an FBI investigator in February 2006 about his hiring of the private investigator Anthony Pellicano to illegally wiretap Charles Roven, the producer of his film Rollerball, around August 2000. McTiernan had been in a disagreement with Roven about what type of film Rollerball should be, and had hired Pellicano to investigate Roven's intentions and actions. He had asked Pellicano to try to find instances where Roven made negative remarks about the studio executives or said things to others that were inconsistent with what he said to the studio.

McTiernan was arraigned and pleaded guilty on April 17, 2006, as part of an initial plea bargain agreement to cooperate with prosecutors in exchange for lenient treatment. Prosecutors said they then became convinced that he was continuing to lie to them, and that he had also hired Pellicano to wiretap someone else, prompting them to seek a prison sentence. McTiernan then hired new counsel and tried to withdraw his guilty plea, saying that his prior counsel had not conducted a proper discovery in the case, and had not presented him with the available defense approach of suppressing as evidence the conversation with him that Pellicano had recorded on August 17, 2000.

This bid was denied by the Federal District Judge, Dale S. Fischer, who immediately proceeded to sentence him to four months in prison and $100,000 in fines. The judge characterized McTiernan as someone who thought he was "above the law", had shown no remorse, and "lived a privileged life and simply wants to continue that". He was ordered to surrender for incarceration by January 15, 2008, but was allowed to remain out of prison on bail pending an appeal to the Ninth Circuit Court of Appeals.

In October 2008, the Ninth Circuit Court of Appeals vacated McTiernan's four-month sentence and ruled that Judge Fischer had erred and he was entitled to a hearing as to whether his plea could be withdrawn. The prosecution and the judge then agreed to allow McTiernan to withdraw his plea rather than proceed with such a hearing, and his plea was withdrawn on February 24, 2009.

With the case reopened, the prosecution was no longer bound by the prior plea agreement, and filed additional charges against McTiernan; he faced another two counts of lying to the FBI (one for claiming he had hired Pellicano only in connection with his divorce proceedings and another for denying he had ever discussed wiretapping with Pellicano) and one count of committing perjury during the previous court proceedings by denying he had been coached by his attorney on what to say during his previous guilty plea hearing, a denial that he later stated in a declaration was false.

After some adverse rulings on his attempted defense arguments, and facing the possibility of a prison sentence of more than five years from the various charges, McTiernan eventually entered another guilty plea on all three counts in a second plea bargain in 2010, conditioned on his plan to appeal the earlier rulings against his defense approach, and Judge Fischer sentenced him to one year in prison, three years of supervised probation, and a fine of $100,000.

The judge stated that the extended duration of the prison sentence was attributed to the additional, more severe charge of perjury before her court. She emphasized that McTiernan's offenses transcended mere lapses in judgment, and he appeared to still not fully acknowledge responsibility for his actions. She remarked that she would have imposed an even longer prison term if the prosecution hadn't suggested otherwise. McTiernan was then released on bail pending an appeal of the adverse rulings.

On August 20, 2012, the Ninth Circuit Court of Appeals affirmed the district court judgment, but allowed McTiernan to address the U.S. Supreme Court regarding his attempt to suppress the recorded conversation before being required to report to prison. His defense tried to argue that Pellicano had made the recording for an unlawful purpose and that this made it inadmissible, but the district and appeals courts disagreed with that interpretation of the rules of evidence. On January 14, 2013, the Supreme Court declined to hear the case.

McTiernan surrendered to federal prison on April 3, 2013, to serve a stated 12-month sentence in the Federal Prison Camp in Yankton, South Dakota, a minimum-security former college campus holding about 800 male inmates, most of whom were white-collar criminals. His Bureau of Prisons registration number was 43029-112. Although the Yankton facility was rated by Forbes magazine as one of "America's 10 cushiest prisons", McTiernan's wife Gail stated that he had found it hard to adapt, having lost 30 pounds (14 kg); she also claimed that he was suffering from depression, and was "disintegrating" emotionally.

While in prison, McTiernan managed to write a possible sequel for The Thomas Crown Affair, with the working title Thomas Crown and the Missing Lioness. His supporters created a "Free John McTiernan" campaign page on Facebook, including expressions of support from Samuel L. Jackson, Alec Baldwin and Brad Bird. He was released from prison on February 25, 2014, after 328 days of incarceration, to serve the remainder of his 12-month prison sentence under house arrest at his ranch home in Wyoming until April 3, 2014.

=== Invasion-of-privacy civil suit ===
On July 3, 2006, McTiernan's former wife, film producer Donna Dubrow, filed suit against him for invasion of privacy and other claims arising from her belief that he hired Pellicano to wiretap her telephone during their divorce negotiations. The lawsuit continued for a decade, ultimately being dismissed in 2016 at Dubrow's request.

=== Debts and bankruptcy ===
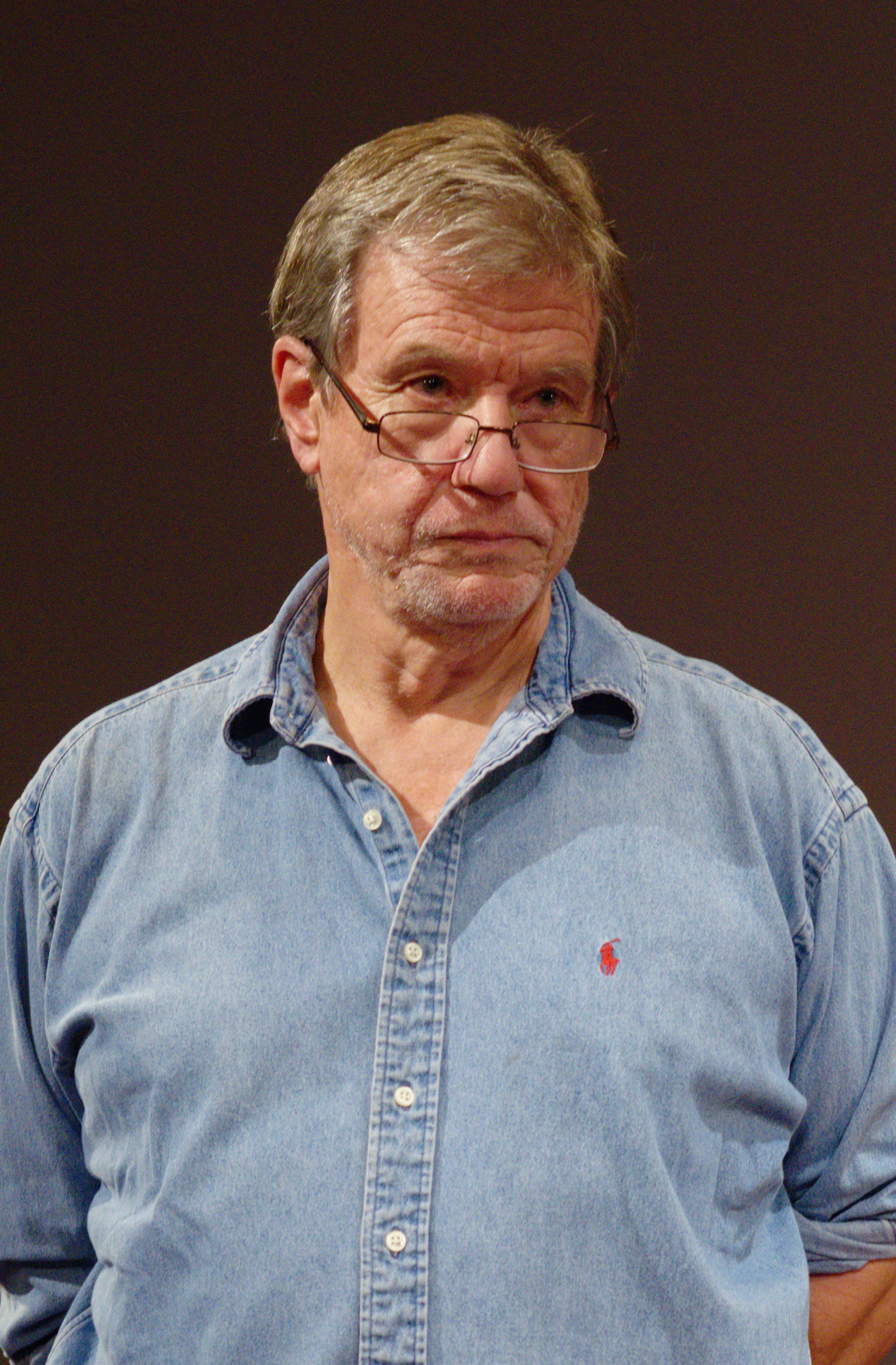
McTiernan at the Cinémathèque Française in Paris in 2014

In October 2013, while in prison, McTiernan filed for chapter 11 bankruptcy amidst foreclosure proceedings for his 3,254-acre (1,317-hectare) ranch residence in central Wyoming (valued at $8–10M), struggles to pay his past legal bills and IRS tax debts, and ongoing expensive disputes including the lawsuit by his ex-wife, a $5 million claim against him of liability in a 2011 automobile accident, and his ongoing effort to reverse his felony conviction.

The bank holding the mortgage on the ranch said the filing was a bad-faith tactic only intended to stall the foreclosure proceedings, and requested the presiding judge to convert the case to a chapter-7 bankruptcy – under the terms of which he would lose control of the bankruptcy case and have a trustee appointed to manage his assets, which would result in the liquidation of his assets rather than giving McTiernan the opportunity to attempt to reorganize his debt himself.

McTiernan's lawyers countered by saying that his potential for generating additional future income from new projects could enable him to eventually repay his debts, so a rapid liquidation of assets would be unnecessary and unjustified. In the bankruptcy proceedings, he identified two likely future film projects with Hannibal Pictures, with working titles Red Squad and Warbirds, with large budgets and significant likely future income and planned to star major well-known actors. On December 8, 2015, a judge ruled against McTiernan – agreeing with his creditors that his assets should be liquidated. It was reported that his ranch was likely to be sold and that an administrator would take over the management of his future film royalty payments.

== Filmography ==
Action movies are usually about—or thought of as [being] about—people who are physically extraordinary. You know, they're "big", "tough" guys. But that's not where most of us are tested, [or] where most of us need courage. [...] [We] live in a world of [...] thinking, and understanding, and deciphering. [...] Particularly if you're making films for young people—and in my case I was always making movies for young men, really—I thought one should be... making heroes... out of the skills that young men really needed. [...] [To] demonstrate that it was that heroic men were sometimes men who simply were heroic, not because of their muscles, but because of their brains; and that is something you should be teaching kids. [...] I always tried to do that, even in a movie that was about, you know: "I'm gonna fight a monster from outer space!" I tried to even depict Arnold [Schwarzenegger] as not just a tough guy, but Arnold is smart and he uses his brain – and that's why he survived, that's why he succeeds.

— John McTiernan, 2025

Director

Year	Title	Director	Producer
1986	Nomads (Note: Also credited as writer)	Yes	No
1987	Predator	Yes	No
1988	Die Hard	Yes	No
1990	The Hunt for Red October	Yes	No
1992	Medicine Man	Yes	No
1993	Last Action Hero	Yes	Yes
1995	Die Hard with a Vengeance	Yes	Yes
1999	The Thomas Crown Affair	Yes	No
1999	The 13th Warrior	Yes	Yes
2002	Rollerball	Yes	Yes
2003	Basic	Yes	No
2009	The Political Prosecutions of Karl Rove (Note: Documentary film)	Yes	No

Executive producer

- Flight of the Intruder (1991) (uncredited)
- Robin Hood (1991)
- Gunfighter's Moon (1995) (uncredited)
- Quicksilver Highway (1997) (TV movie)

Producer

- The Right to Remain Silent (1996) (TV movie)
- Amanda (1996)

== Awards and nominations ==
Year	Award	Category	Title	Result
1988	Hugo Award	Best Dramatic Presentation	Predator	Nominated
1989	Hochi Film Award	Best International Picture	Die Hard	Won
1989	Blue Ribbon Awards	Best Foreign Film	Die Hard	Won
1990	Kinema Junpo Awards	Best Foreign Language Film	Die Hard	Won
1990	Japan Academy Awards	Outstanding Foreign Language Film	Die Hard	Won
1997	American Film Institute	Franklin J. Schaffner Award		Won
2003	Stinkers Bad Movie Awards	Worst Director	Rollerball	Won
2003	Stinkers Bad Movie Awards	Worst Remake	Rollerball	Won

== See also ==
- John McTiernan's unrealized projects
