= Nomads (1986 film) =

1986 film by John McTiernan

- Theatrical release poster
- Directed by: John McTiernan
- Written by: John McTiernan
- Based on: Nomads by Chelsea Quinn Yarbro
- Produced by: Elliott Kastner; Cassian Elwes; George Pappas
- Starring: Lesley-Anne Down; Pierce Brosnan; Anna Maria Monticelli
- Cinematography: Stephen Ramsey
- Edited by: Michael John Bateman
- Music by: Bill Conti; Ted Nugent (Guitar
- Distributed by: Atlantic Releasing Corporation
- Release dates: January 1986 (Avoriaz Fantasy Film Festival); March 7, 1986
- Running time: 93 minutes
- Country: United States
- Language: English
- Box office: $2.3 million (US)

Nomads is a 1986 American horror film written and directed by John McTiernan, adapted from the novel of the same name by Chelsea Quinn Yarbro. It stars Pierce Brosnan, Lesley-Anne Down and Anna Maria Monticelli. The story involves French anthropologist Jean-Charles Pommier, who is an expert on nomads. He stumbles across a group of urban nomads who turn out to be more than he expected.

== Plot ==
In a Los Angeles city hospital, Jean-Charles Pommier, a French anthropologist, is brought into the emergency room. Despite being badly beaten, he keeps resisting the doctors' attempts at treating him and does not stop shouting at them in French. However, no one can understand him. Moments after he dies, one of the physicians treating him, Dr. Eileen Flax, becomes possessed with his memories. While seeing bits of Pommier's life through his eyes, Flax has an accident and gets knocked out. When she wakes up, she gets out of the hospital without telling anybody and continues reliving Pommier's life, visiting the places he was at as they come up in her visions.

Flax's flashbacks tell the story of the final week in Pommier's life. At the start of it, after years of travelling around the world and studying the religious beliefs and spiritual rituals of non-Western cultures, Pommier finally settles down with his wife Niki in Los Angeles to teach at UCLA. His home in the suburbs is vandalized one night by a gang of street punks who travel around in a black van. They are very interested in his house and he finds that they have built a shrine in his garage to a murderer who recently killed two girls who lived there. He studies them because their nomadic subculture exhibits similarities to the ones he has studied abroad.

Pommier begins to observe the street punks, following them and covertly photographing them. While doing this, he witnesses them killing a man and hiding the body in a dumpster. However, when he checks the dumpster later, the body has disappeared. Despite being afraid of them, he is also fascinated, as he misses his own nomadic lifestyle and has qualms about complying to Niki's wishes and settling down in the United States.

One night, Pommier develops the pictures and is puzzled to find that the street punks do not show up in them. He realizes that they are actually demonic Inuit trickster spirits that take human form, commit acts of violence and mischief and are attracted to places of violence and death. They become aware of him and start appearing at his house. A frightened Pommier is eventually chased through the streets by the spirits. To hide from them, he gets inside an abandoned building and meets Bertril, a nun who already knows his name. She offers to help him and he accepts, until the ghosts of more nuns appear and start chasing him. Pommier returns to his house, where he sees a punk standing outside. Disturbed, Pommier grabs a metal rod and seemingly beats him to death. When Pommier enters his house and looks through a window, the body is gone. In the bedroom, Pommier wakes up Niki and has sex with her.

Flax awakens in Pommier's bedroom, in the arms of Niki. They try to flee the city to escape the spirits but the house is surrounded by an army of leather-clad bikers and punks. The spirits storm the house, forcing the women to flee to the attic. One of the nomads, Dancing Mary, breaks into the attic but leaves after scaring them. The nomads later leave the house and the women come out of the attic to find everything destroyed. After packing their bags, they flee the city. As they are driving down a back road out of Los Angeles, a leather-clad man on a motorcycle rides near them. Flax warns Niki that whatever she sees, she should not stop. As they drive past him, they are horrified to see that the man is Pommier, who is now one of the nomads.

== Cast ==
- Pierce Brosnan as Jean Charles Pommier, a French anthropologist
- Lesley-Anne Down as Dr. Eileen Flax, an ER doctor
- Anna-Maria Monticelli as Veronique "Niki" Pommier
- Adam Ant as Number One, a Nomad
- Mary Woronov as Dancing Mary, a Nomad
- Nina Foch as Real estate agent
- Frances Bay as Bertril, a nun
- Frank Doubleday as Razors, a Nomad
- Josie Cotton as Silver Ring, a Nomad
- Jeannie Elias as Cassie
- Hector Mercado as Ponytail, a Nomad

== Production ==
Gérard Depardieu was considered to play the central character Jean-Charles Pommier before Pierce Brosnan was cast in his first leading role in a film. He welcomed the opportunity to play a character so different from his eponymous role in Remington Steele. Lesley-Anne Down was cast by producer Elliott Kastner and paid $250,000. She would say that John McTiernan, the director, "was exceptionally hostile toward me ... He didn't want me anywhere near that film. He wanted to go more Hitchcockian and have some blonde, Yankee whatever", adding that McTiernan was having an affair with Anna-Maria Monticelli. Down thought that some of the film "was very good, and some of it was plainly f**king stupid. I believe, had he gone for more of a supernatural or ghostly situation, and not so much 'Here are these people who do this', it would have been a better film. But making it all a reality didn't work. He should have made it a straight-up supernatural horror film, and then it would have been good."

== Critical reception ==
On the review aggregator website Rotten Tomatoes, 36% of 14 critics' reviews are positive. The rating average is 4.60/10.

Jay Scott of The Globe and Mail said of Nomads, "... a breathlessly unself-conscious film (there is none of the self-congratulatory stylization of Blood Simple), the tone alternates maniacally between scaring the audience and making it giggle. Until the end. And then, via one of the funniest, cleverest and most unexpected conclusions to any movie in history, Nomads comes off the fence it has been sitting on with a bravura jump." Scott credited McTiernan, noting that "he has brought to his project a staggeringly resourceful technique. The sharply unpredictable editing, the hypnotic use of slow motion and rack focus (that's when the background and foreground reverse in clarity), the ominous rock music – everything adds up to a debut of singular confidence, full of fun and creepiness."

Roger Ebert of the Chicago Sun-Times rated the film 1.5/4 stars and wrote that even if viewers cared about the characters, the film is too confusing to understand. Variety wrote, "Nomads avoids the more obvious ripped-guts devices in favor of dramatic visual scares. [...] In fact, everything seems to come naturally in a tale that even has the supernatural ring true." Walter Goodman of The New York Times called the Innuat "as menacing as the chorus from West Side Story".

In his memoir, Total Recall, Arnold Schwarzenegger states that he hired McTiernan to direct Predator after seeing Nomads and being impressed by the tense atmosphere that McTiernan achieved with a small budget.

== See also ==
- List of ghost films
