= Middelberg =

Middelberg is a surname. Notable people with the surname include:

- Mathias Middelberg (born 1964), German lawyer and politician
- Walter Middelberg (1875–1944), Dutch rower
