= Middelburg =

Middelburg may refer to:

== Places and jurisdictions ==
=== Europe ===
- Middelburg, Zeeland, the capital city of the province of Zeeland, southwestern Netherlands
  - Roman Catholic Diocese of Middelburg, a former Catholic diocese with its see in the Zeeland city, Netherlands
- Middelburg, South Holland, a small village near Reeuwijk, Netherlands
- Middelburg, Belgium

=== South Africa ===
- Middelburg, Mpumalanga, a large industrial and farming town on the Highveld in South Africa
- Middelburg, Eastern Cape, a town in the Great Karoo, South Africa

=== Asia-Pacific ===
- Middelburg Bastion, in the Fortress of Malacca, Malaysia
- Middelburg Island, former name of 'Eua, an island of Tonga

== People with the surname ==
- Jack Middelburg (1952–1984), Dutch motorcycle road racer
- Paul of Middelburg (1446–1534), Belgian Roman Catholic scientist and bishop

== Others ==
- Middelburg (ship), 18th century Dutch ship
