= Annie Byron =

Australian actress

- Born: Inverell, New South Wales, Australia
- Education: University of New South Wales; National Institute of Dramatic Art
- Occupation: Actress
- Years active: 1971–present
- Awards: AFI Award for Best Actress in a Supporting Role for Fran (1985)

Annie Byron is an Australian film, stage, and television actress best known for Wolf Creek 2, Fran, Muriel's Wedding, and Doing Time for Patsy Cline.

== Early life and education ==
Annie Byron was born in Inverell, New South Wales. She attended primary school at St. Mary's Ross Hill Primary School and Sacred Heart Primary School, then high school at St. Ursula's College in Armidale and Inverell High School.

She is a graduate of the University of New South Wales.

After graduating university, she enrolled in the National Institute of Dramatic Art along with Steve Bisley, Debra Lawrence, Robert Menzies, Peter Kingston, Judy Davis, and Mel Gibson.

== Career ==
Byron was cast as Lou, the second wife of Harry Sullivan in the Australian television series The Sullivans the year after graduating from NIDA. She has since worked in numerous film, television, theatre and radio productions in Australia for over 30 years. She is best known for her roles as Lil in Wolf Creek 2, as Marge in Fran, as Rhonda's Mother in Muriel's Wedding, and as Mum in Doing Time for Patsy Cline.

She has performed with Australian theatre companies Sydney Theatre Company, Belvoir St Theatre, the Ensemble Theatre, The Q, Perth Actors Collective, HotHouse Theatre, Griffin Theatre Company, and the Playbox Theatre Company.

She performed in the sold out run of Sydney Theatre Company's production of Hedda Gabler opposite Cate Blanchett and Hugo Weaving in 2004 in Sydney and in 2006 at Brooklyn Academy of Music in New York City. She also toured internationally to Dublin, Seoul, and Montreal with Force Majeure's production of The Age I'm In.

== Filmography ==
=== Film ===
Byron's film performances include:

Year	Title	Role	Notes
1984	Silver City	Dorothy	Feature film
1984	Displaced Persons	Nurse Evans	TV movie
1985	Fran	Marge	Feature film Won: AFI Award for Best Actress in a Supporting Role in 1985
1987	Great Expectations: The Untold Story	Mrs. Joe Gargery	TV movie
1989	Afraid to Dance	Betty	Feature film
1990	Shadows of the Heart	Rose Flanagan	TV movie
1992	The Distant Home	Dr. Allport	TV movie
1992	Clowning Around	Una Crealy	TV movie
1993	No Worries	Mrs. Burke	Feature film
1993	How Wonderful	Midwife	Feature film
1994	Muriel's Wedding	Berris (Rhonda's mother)	Feature film
1997	Doing Time for Patsy Cline	Ralph's mum	Feature film Nominated: AFI Award for Best Performance by an Actress in a Supporting Role in 1997
2000	My Mother Frank	Eunice	Feature film
2000	Six O'Clock Swill	Aunt Alice	Short film
2003	The Postcard Bandit	Thelma Abbott	TV movie
2006	Stepfather of the Bride	Stephanie	TV movie
2007	Glory	Glory	Short film
2007	In the Company of Actors	Herself	Documentary film
2008	ActingClassof1977.com	Herself	Documentary film
2008	The View from Greenhaven	Clare	Feature film
2013	Wolf Creek 2	Lil	Feature film
2014	Glory	Glory	Short film
2015	Ruby	Ruby	Short film
2018	Slam	Diana	Feature film
2020	Mothboy	Leading	Short film
2020	Goodbye Text	Bridget	Short film
2022	Nut Farm	Esme	Feature film

=== Television ===
Byron's TV performances include:

Year	Title	Role	Notes
1971	The Comedy Game	Actress	Episode: "Aunty Jack's Travelling Show"
1976-83	The Sullivans	Lou Sullivan	1978-80
1978	Father, Dear Father In Australia	Mrs. Rees	Episode: "Novel Exercise"
1988	The Flying Doctors	Julie McDonald	Episode: "Johnnie Come Home"
1983-92	A Country Practice	Patricia York / June Allen / Vivienne Roberts / Meryl Bellamy / Carol Hacking / Liz Mitchell	11 episodes
1990	Home and Away	Angela Newton	3 episodes
1998–2006	All Saints	Maisie Sparks / Julie Costello	3 episodes
1999	Murder Call	Magda Trebor	Episode: "Dead Offerings"
2000	The Potato Factory	Lusty Duchess (main)	Miniseries, 4 episodes
2000	Backberner	Politician	
2003	Always Greener	Lolly Hopkins	3 episodes
2003	Stingers	Liliana Jarras	Episode: "Sons & Lovers"
2006	All Saints	Maisey	
2008	All Saints	Molly (guest)	
2018	Drop Dead Weird	Maryanne	Season 2
2017	Growing Up Gracefully	Barrister	
2017	Home and Away	Grandmother (guest)	
2018	Doctor Doctor	Vivian	

== Stage ==
Byron's stage performances include:

Year	Title	Role	Notes
1978	Widowers' Houses	Maid	Parade Theatre with Old Tote Theatre Company
1979	Interview		D1 Studio, Kensington with NIDA
1979	Little Lunches		ABC Radio Sydney
1979	A Cheery Soul	Mrs Wakeman / Mrs Watmuff	Sydney Opera House with STC
1979	The Lady of the Camellias	Maid	Sydney Opera House with STC
1979	Discovering Australia	Main cast	Orange Doors Theatre / St John's Hall, Paddington with Griffin Theatre Company
1979	The Grand Finale of Rene Trouver	Her	Orange Doors Theatre / St John's Hall, Paddington with Griffin Theatre Company
1980	New Blood	Woman	Performance Space, Cleveland Street
1981	The Bridal Suite	Vera, the bride	Stables Theatre, Sydney with Griffin Theatre Company
1981	The Venetian Twins	Rosaura	Seymour Centre, Canberra Theatre, Festival Theatre Adelaide, Her Majesty's Theatre, Melbourne & Geelong with Nimrod Theatre Company
1983	Miss Julie	Servant	Belvoir Street Theatre with Nimrod Theatre Company
1983	The Bear	Servant	Belvoir Street Theatre with Nimrod Theatre Company
1984	1984 A.D.	Main cast	Sydney Festival & Arts Theatre, Adelaide for Adelaide Festival & Australian Elizabethan Theatre Trust
1984	The Shifting Heart	Leila Pratt	Phillip Street Theatre
1986	The Man from Mukinupin	Main cast	Q Theatre Company
	All the Black Dogs	The Mother	Griffin Theatre Company
1987	A Lie of the Mind	Meg (Beth's mother)	Belvoir Theatre Company with Company B
1988	Capricornia	Buller / Hollower / Aviatrix	Australian national tour with Belvoir Street Theatre / with Company B
1989	After Dinner	Dympie	Griffin Theatre Company
	Dreams of a Salesman	Main cast	School tour with STC
1989	Jigsaw	Sister	Q Theatre Company
	Away	Coral	Q Theatre Company / Marian Street Theatre
	The Painted Woman	Molly	Belvoir Street Theatre
1992	Pushin' Up Daisies	Mum	Stables Theatre, Sydney with Griffin Theatre Company
	The Cripple of Inishmaan	Kate	STC
	Morning Sacrifice	Miss Sole	STC
1994	Breaststroke		SWY Theatre, Perth / Perth Actors Collective
1995	That Christmas in '75		Theatre South, Coniston
1995	The Passion and its Deep Connection with Lemon Delicious Pudding		Malthouse Theatre for Playbox Theatre Company
1996	Playgrounds		Wharf Theatre, Sydney, with STC
1997	Act One		Ensemble Theatre
1997	Flexi-Time		Ensemble Theatre
1997	Market Forces		Ensemble Theatre
2001	Up the Creek		Belvoir Street Theatre
2002	Earl		Stables Theatre, Sydney, with Griffin Theatre Company
	A Conversation	Coral	Australian national tour with Ensemble Theatre
2003	Wonderlands	Cathy Andrews	The Butter Factory Theatre, Wodonga, Riverina Playhouse & Stables Theatre with Griffin Theatre Company / HotHouse Theatre
2003	The Blue Roof	The Woman	The Street Theatre, Acton & Australian national tour with Jigsaw Theatre Company
2003	Eleanor and Eve	Eve	Q Theatre with Weatherboard Theatre Company
2004	The Vagina Monologues		Footbridge Theatre, University of Sydney
2004	The Nargun and the Stars	Edie	Sydney Festival & Perth Festival with ERTH
2004 / 2006	Hedda Gabler	Berta	Wharf Theatre, Sydney, & Brooklyn Academy of Music, New York City, with STC
2005	Bed	Flo	Wharf Theatre, Sydney, with STC
2005	Nailed	Dolly	Stables Theatre, Sydney, with Griffin Theatre Company
2006	Embers	Various characters	The Butter Factory Theatre, Wodonga, Majestic Cinemas Sydney & Wharf Theatre with STC / HotHouse Theatre
2007	Parramatta Girls	Gayle	Belvoir Theatre Company for Company B
2007	The Small Things	The Woman	Belvoir Theatre Company with Splinter Theatre Company / B Sharp
2007	ALP Arts Election Launch		Riverside Theatres Parramatta
2008	Yibiyung	Teacher / Matron / Farmer's Wife	Belvoir Theatre Company, Malthouse Theatre & Riverside Theatres Parramatta
2009	The Nargun and the Stars	Edie	Regal Theatre, Perth with ERTH
2009–10	The Age I'm In	Maggie (Grandmother)	Sydney Festival, Adelaide Fringe Festival with Force Majeure
2010	Calendar Girls	Lady Cravenshire / Lady Catherine / Brenda Halse	Comedy Theatre, Melbourne & Australian national tour with Gordon Frost Organisation
2010	Zero Tolerance	Sundry / Main cast	Q Theatre
2011	Before/After	Sundry / Main Cast	Wharf Theatre, Sydney, with STC
2011	Dad and Dave: On Our Selection	Mum	Q Theatre
2011 / 2012	Boxing Day	Nana / Poppy	Old Fitzroy Theatre & Australian regional tour with Critical Stages
2011 / 2013	RU4ME	Connie	One woman show at Riverside Theatres Parramatta
2016	Never Did Me Any Harm	Creative development	Carriageworks with Force Majeure
2012	Biddies	Beryl	Australian national tour with CDP
2013	From Door to Door	Bessie	Sydney Jewish Museum with Blumenthal Productions
2014	Parramatta Girls	Judi	Lennox Theatre, Parramatta
2014	A Doll's House	Helen	Seymour Centre with SFI
2015	The Crucible	Rebecca Nurse	Leura Park Estate, Curlewis for Sport For Jove Theatre Company
2015	Head Full of Love	Nessa Tavistock	Australian tour with QTC
2016	Life Without Me	Mrs Spence (Martin's mum)	Seymour Centre with Illuminate Educate
2016	My Name is Asher Lev	Mother / Art Dealer / Model	Eternity Playhouse with Blumenthal Productions
2017	Babes in the Woods	Auntie Avaricia / The Dame	Old Fitzroy Theatre
	Diving for Pearls		Q Theatre Company
	Inside the Island		Belvoir Street Theatre with Company B
2016	Inner Voices	Pet	Old Fitzroy Theatre
2017	Neighbourhood Watch		Lennox Theatre, Parramatta
2017	Kindertransport	Lil Miller	Darlinghurst Theatre with Eternity Playhouse
2017	You Will Not Play Wagner	Esther	Eternity Playhouse with Blumenthal Productions
2017	The Age I'm In	Maggie (Grandmother)	Pavilion Theatre Dublin, Cinquieme Salle Montreal, ArKo Arts Theatre, South Korea with Force Majeure
2019	Mosquitoes	Karen (Mother)	Sydney Opera House with STC
2019	The God of Isaac	Mrs Adams	Darlinghurst Theatre with Blumenthal Productions
2020	A Kind of Reunion (reading)		ARA Darling Quarter Theatre with Blumenthal Productions
2020	Everybody		Kings Cross Theatre with Cross Pollinate Productions
2021	Two Sisters (reading)	Edith	Emanuel Synagogue
2022	Her Brilliant Career (reading)	Performer	State Theatre, Sydney with Blumenthal Productions
2023	Wilfrid Gordon McDonald Partridge	Miss Nancy	Australian Chamber Orchestra

== Awards ==
Year	Nominee / work	Award	Result
1985	Fran	AFI Award for Best Actress in a Supporting Role	Won
1997	Doing Time for Patsy Cline	AFI Award for Best Performance by an Actress in a Supporting Role	Nominated
