= Parramatta Girls =

Play

Parramatta Girls is a play written by Australian playwright Alana Valentine. It is a dramatised account of the collected testimonies of former inmates of the Parramatta Girls Home, staged as a reunion forty years after the institution closed.

Valentine began writing the play after watching an ABC Television programme (Stateline) in 2003, which documented the experiences of three Indigenous women – Marjorie, Coral, and Marlene – who had been incarcerated at the Girls Home. She immediately sought to interview these women. In the weeks following, Stateline broadcast more episodes on non-Indigenous women's experiences in the home, which prompted Valentine to construct the script.

"I thought that this was a story that needed to be understood in more detail than 15 minutes on a current affairs programme would allow. [...] It immediately struck me as the voices of people who had not been heard on the Australian mainstage. It immediately struck me that surviving such an institution must involve an incredible story of triumph and courage. These were women with guts, attitude and humour and they were crying out to have their story heard." - Alana Valentine (2007)

The play was first performed by Company B of Belvoir St Theatre on 21 March 2007 (until 22 April 2007), directed by Wesley Enoch, and the script was later published in July 2007.

== Context: the Girls Home ==
The Parramatta Girls Home was a state government facility - located in Parramatta, New South Wales, Australia - that housed “morally corrupt and depraved” adolescent girls from 1887 until its closure in 1974. The Home has been known as the Girls Training Home, Girls Training School, Girls Industrial School, Parramatta Girls Home, Kamballa (Girls) and Taldree (Boys) Children's Centre– all of which reflect its tumultuous, infamous history and the changes in Australia's child welfare and protection policies. It was Australia's longest operating state-controlled ‘child welfare’ institution, holding between 160 and 200 inmates at one time and, in total, potentially more than 30,000 children passing through its doors.

“What happened to us was just criminal – there were rapes going on, there were bashings – not just a little smack in the face, there were kicks... All I remember is big black boots coming into ya all the bloody time.” (Field notes, 2 April 2011, from Franklin, 2014: 162)

Public pressure and media exposure eventually sparked a government inquiry and investigation into the conditions, regulations, and staff misconduct (which, when revealed, prompted the Home's eventual closure) the girls were subject to – given the reports of brutal physical, emotional, mental, and sexual violence that occurred as "strict discipline" and "extreme" punishments behind closed doors.

It is these reports, testimonies, stories, and experiences Parramatta Girls was inspired by and is built upon.

== Outline ==
The play is staged as a reunion of eight former-inmates of the Parramatta Girls Home - now grown women - in 2003, forty years after they finished their respective terms.

It is divided into two acts, with a total 22 scenes, and moves between the present (the reunion) and the remembered past (in flashbacks).

The play opens in the courtyard of the Home, November 2003. The women begin to arrive at the reunion, greet one another (some more tense than others), and congregate outside the institution's iron gates.

When they step through the gates, the audience is taken on a journey between the past and present as the women explore the building. In flashbacks, the girls re-enact each other's experiences at the home: their arrival (and the court trial that brought Marlene there), their medical examinations by ‘Dr Fingers’, their chores, and their abuses and mistreatment - sometimes by invisible guards, sometimes one another (especially to Maree), and sometimes to themselves (in acts of self-harm).

As the play comes to a crescendo in the second Act, the past and present merge on-stage. Two of the girls attempt to escape the institution and their torment, but after being told that a particularly dangerous guard is after then, they climb to the roof of the Home and refuse to come down. A riot ensues, involving all of the girls but comes to an end when tragedy strikes the group.

The grown women are left to clean up the mess of the riot (their literal past), which clears a path for the women to come together, to open up, and to reveal harboured secrets, lies, and truths and "wash away" (some of) their past. This activity leads to the end of the play, and the women ask the audience to remember their stories today, as well as those who cannot tell their own, and leave the audience with a message of hope for good, for remedy, and for claiming their own futures as women, mothers, and Parramatta Girls.

== Characters ==
The eight female characters of the play are:

- Marlene: a 57-year-old indigenous woman and former inmate; she is 13-years-old during flashbacks
  - Much of the play (especially the flashbacks) happens through Marlene's eyes. She was the youngest of the eight to enter the Home after being charged with "neglect" and "mental retardation".
- Judi: a 59-year-old woman and former inmate; she is 16-years-old during flashbacks
  - Her real name is Fay McKell. She reveals that she allowed the guards to sexually abuse her to feel like she was in control. After leaving, she entered prostitution and acquired an extensive criminal record. She is cynical about the reunion, but eventually sees its value.
- Melanie: a 58-year-old woman and former inmate; she is 15-years-old during flashback
  - Incarcerated because she ran from her abusive home, she is a protective figure to the other girls throughout the play, especially Marlene.
- Lynette: a 57-year-old woman and former inmate; she is 14-years-old during flashbacks
  - Hailing from a wealthy Eastern Suburbs family, with a private school education, Lynette's "posh" upbringing is a contrast to the rest of the women who come from lower-class backgrounds. She is haunted by the death of Maree, her close friend, and experiences deep anxiety throughout the play.
- Kerry: a 58-year-old indigenous woman and former inmate; she is 15-years-old during flashbacks
  - Kerry has been in institutional care her whole life. She escaped the home but was caught, returned and punished. She tells of her role in having the Home closed down, and that the reunion is her first chance at her story being heard (and believed).
- Gayle: a 59-year-old woman and former inmate; she is 16-years-old during flashbacks
  - The 'House Captain', she experienced a "little bit of power" during her time after living with an emotionally and physically abusive mother and step-father. She is haunted by memories of the Home's 'dungeons', and her acts of self-harm. Though she treats the girls with disdain, she did protect them when they needed it.
- Maree: a 14-year-old female inmate.
  - She is a memory and a ghost - appearing to Lynette and Gayle (as adults). She took her own life in the home after her cruel and traumatic mistreatment.
- Coral: a 58-year-old indigenous women and former inmate; she is 16-years-old in flashbacks.
  - Adult Coral is one of the organisers of the reunion, she speaks of being impregnated by one of the guards but was brutally bashed in a deliberately attempted abortion. Though she gave birth to the child, it was forcibly removed from her.

Despite being eight individual characters, these figures can be understood as composites drawn from the any Girls who Valentine spoke to in her research. Doing so avoided putting a spotlight on any particular women and a flexibility to dramatise their stories throughout the play.

== Genre ==
Parramatta Girls is understood and studied (in New South Wales Higher School Certificate Drama course) as a piece of verbatim theatre.

This style of theatre can be understood as the recording and compilation of interviews and conversations with a community about a topic or event (usually of some significance) to be used as the direct content or creative stimulus for the development of a script and dramatised performance. It can be described as a hybrid of journalism and theatre, using techniques to tell a story rather than show as conventional theatre is understood, which has been criticised as 'un-theatrical'. The other conventions of the genre can be likened to those of Bertolt Brecht's Epic Theatre, and include:

- Direct address
- Monologues
- Narration
- Chorus
- Flashbacks
- Minimal movement and a functional stage design
- Song and musical/sound effects
- Multimedia (audio, visual) aides - including placards, 'subtitles' on screens, etc.
- Re-staging the interview
- Fragmentation and repetition
- Presentational rhetoric

Valentine describes Parramatta Girls as "massaged verbatim" – which captures “the spirit, the soul, the way of being in the world that those women were” (quoted in Oades, 2010, p. 59) - rather than composing and portraying precise re-presentations.

To compose the play, Valentine met, talked to, and gathered the stories and experiences of more than 35 women (former-inmates) through in-depth face-to-face interviews, phone conversations, and some while waiting to go in to a reunion being held at the site on 3 November 2003. As well as the Girls, she spoke to men and other women who had spent their childhood 'in care', read novels and non-fiction about 'children in care', and attended Senate hearings in the 'Inquiry into Children in Institutional Care' (the findings were published in 'Forgotten Australians', August 2004).

"There was a lot of 'imaginative' research, if I can put it that way, as well as the pure fact-finding and interviewing." - Alana Valentine, in explaining her research methods

Though predominantly dialogue, there are occasional monologues of direct address throughout the play, using the colloquialisms, verbal mannerisms and verbatim of the women that gives an authentic insight into the community of women Valentine interviewed. The authenticity of these stories is reinforced in the place names, songs, stage directions and physical movements used by Valentine that allow the audience to see the characters and their stories as genuine rather than fictitious creations.

== Performance history ==
=== Debut: First public reading: 2004, Belvoir St Theatre ===
The play made its debut in a public reading held at the Belvoir St Theatre on 26 July 2004 as part of their 2004 Winter Play Reading Series. Wesley Enoch directed the reading, with Elaine Crombie, Lilian Crombie, Judi Farr, Katrina Foster, Gillian Jones, Kris McQuade, Christopher Pitman, Leah Purcell, and Evelyn Rankmore listed as actors.

Some former-inmates attended this reading, wherein actors read transcripts of some of the women's stories Valentine had collected. She said the goal of this reading was "truth telling" (p. 10), because these women felt they had never and would never be heard or believed if they told their stories, and breaking that was the first thing Valentine wanted to address.

=== Second public reading: 2005, Belvoir St Theatre ===
Valentine held a second public reading with Belvoir St Theatre's Company B on 23 May 2005 as part of their 2005 Winter Play Reading Series. Wesley Enoch, again, was the director but some new faces joined the team of actors (with Lillian Crombie, Judi Farr, and Kris McQuade remaining on board), including: Justine Clarke, Judie Hamilton, Ray Kelly, Deborah Mailman, and Kyas Sherriff.

=== First performance: 2007, Belvoir St Theatre ===
Parramatta Girls was first performed at Belvoir St Theatre by Company B on 17 March 2007 until 22 April 2007, directed by Wesley Enoch.

Cast (Company B)
| Actor | Character |
|---|---|
| Valeria Bader | Lynette / Mother |
| Annie Byron | Gayle |
| Jeanette Cronin | Melanie |
| Lisa Flanagan | Kerry |
| Genevieve Hegney | Maree |
| Roxanne McDonald | Coral |
| Leah Purcell | Marlene |
| Carole Skinner | Judi |

Production team
| Member | Design element |
|---|---|
| Ralph Myers | Set designer |
| Alice Babidge | Costume designer |
| Rachel Burke | Lighting designer |
| Steve Francis | Composer / Sound designer |
| Michael McGlynn | Musical director |
| Kyle Rowlands | Fight director |
| Luke Woodham | Stage Manager |
| Nell Ranney | Assistant Stage Manager |
| Sophie Doubleday | NIDA Secondment |

=== Second performance: 2011, New Theatre ===
The piece was performed again in 2011, from 18 May until 11 June at the New Theatre, Sydney, directed by Annette Rowlison.

The cast included Di Adams, Kylie Coolwell, Elaine Crombie, Sandy Velini, Kym Parrish, Christine Greenough, Amanda Marsden

Production team
| Member | Role |
|---|---|
| Annette Rowlison | Director |
| Jen Carmody | Stage Manager |
| Leigh Scanlon | Production Manager |
| Adam Chantler | Set Designer |
| Casey Moon-Watton | Lighting Designer |
| Elizabeth Franklin | Costume Designer |
| George Cartledge | Sound Composer |
| Kei Johnston-Anderson | Assistant Stage Manager |

=== Third performance: 2014, Riverview Productions ===
In 2014, Riverview Productions staged the play for a third time from 3 to 17 May in Lennox Theatre, Parramatta.

Tanya Goldberg directed this performance, accompanied by a new team of designers and actors (as below).

Cast
| Actors | Character |
|---|---|
| Vanessa Downing | Lynette |
| Sandy Gore | Gayle |
| Anni Finsterer | Melanie |
| Holly Austin | Maree |
| Christine Anu | Coral |
| Sharni McDermott | Tessa |
| Tessa Rose | Marlene |
| Annie Byron | Judi |

Production team
| Member | Role |
|---|---|
| Tanya Goldberg | Director |
| Camilla Rountree | Producer |
| Tobhiyah Stone Feller | Designer |
| Verity Hampson | Lighting Designer |
| Jeremy Silver | Sound Designer |

== Reviews ==
From its debut performance, the play received widespread praise for its portrayal of these women's stories.

Belvoir St Theatre's promotions describe the play as a "joyous and heartbreaking... stirring tribute to mischief and humour in the face of hardship and inequality". Many reviews follow this thread, commenting on the way the pain and grief experienced by these women, whilst central to the play, is overpowered by the love, trust, and support the women offer one another as they deal with their haunting past through humour, courage, and tenderness.

Valentine's 'massaged verbatim' has been described as "clever and poignant" and composed in a way that makes her dramatic influence difficult to discern from the real testimonies. The joyous and challenging stories she has constructed "radiate with humour, tenderness and courage" of women uniting to tell their common stories through a script that blurs and unites life and art as one.

Criticism comes for Valentines sometimes "constructing" hand, which can sometimes make the dialogue "unnatural and difficult to believe".
