= Sally McKenzie =

Australian actress

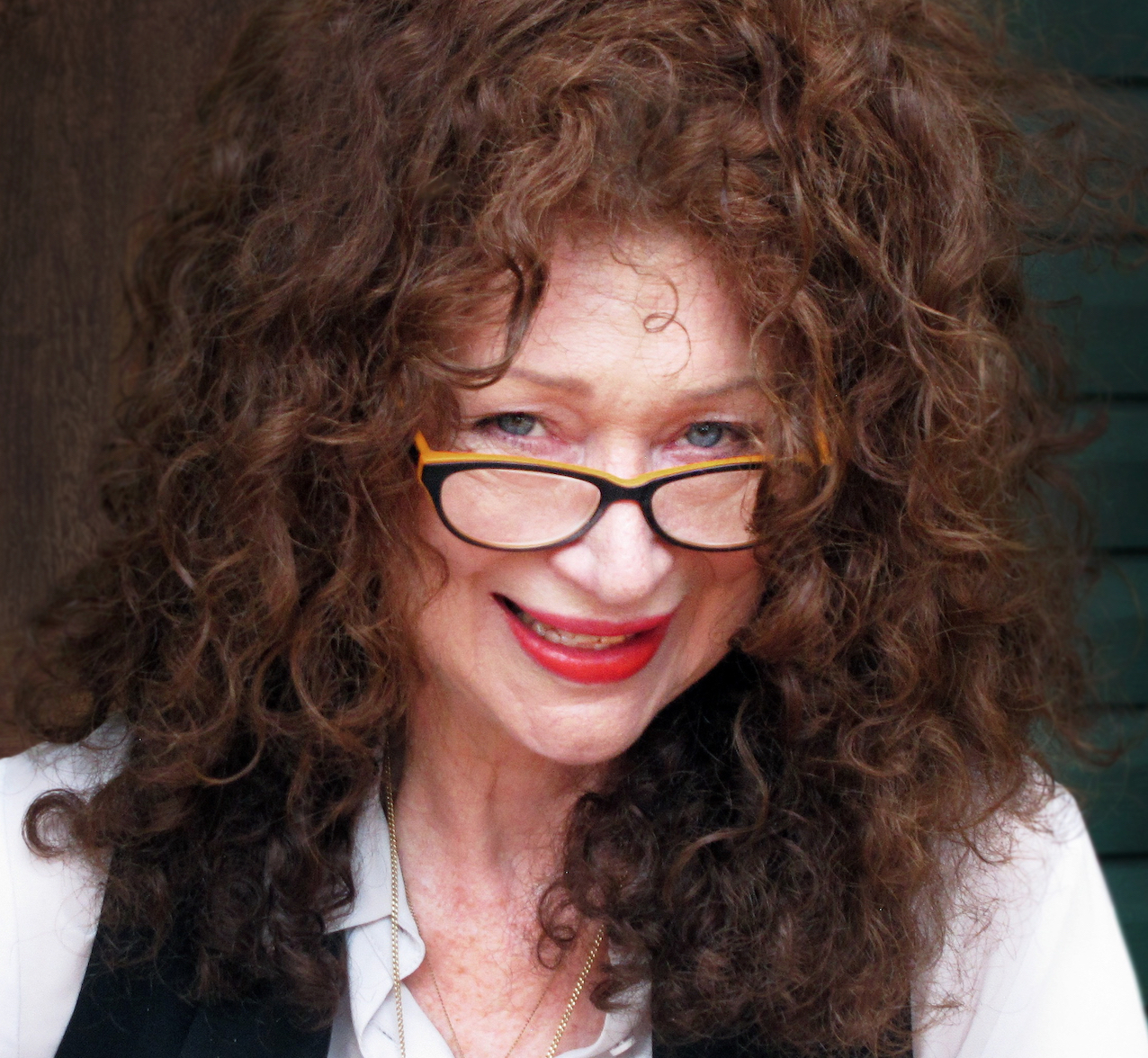
- Sally McKenzie in 2017
- Born: 8 February 1955 (age 71); Sydney, New South Wales, Australia
- Education: National Institute of Dramatic Art, Queensland University of Technology, Flinders University
- Occupations: Actress; director; dramatist/playwright; screenwriter
- Years active: 1976–present
- Children: 2

Sally McKenzie (born Sarah 8 February 1955) also credited as Sally MacKenzie, is an Australian actress, director, playwright and screenwriter. She graduated from Australia's National Institute of Dramatic Art in 1977. She was awarded a Master of Fine Arts from the Queensland University of Technology in 1996.

== Early life and education ==
Sally May McKenzie was born on 8 February 1955 in Lindfield a suburb of Sydney. McKenzie grew up in South Australia. From the age of 11 she took drama classes run by Morna Jones who established the Patch Theatre. During her teenage years McKenzie performed with the Pioneer Players, the Arts Theatre, Theatre 62 and the Bunyip Children's Theatre. She began an arts degree at Flinders University but only completed 2 years before moving to Sydney to study acting at the National Institute of Dramatic Art (NIDA).

== Career ==
McKenzie graduated from NIDA in 1977. In 1978 McKenzie performed under the direction of Peter Schumann with the Bread & Puppet Theater at the Adelaide Festival and understudied all the female roles for the Queensland Theatre Company (QTC) touring production of King Lear in which Warren Mitchell played Lear and Geoffrey Rush played the Fool. In 1979 she was part of the Early Childhood Drama Project the professional arm at La Boite Theatre Company where she performed in numerous productions including The Hills Family Show.

In 1980 McKenzie was a member of the TN! Theatre Company inaugural ensemble performing Jenny Diver in The Threepenny Opera under the baton of Georg Tintner. In 1981 she played Lavinia Mannon in Mourning Becomes Electra for QTC a role she reprised for the Melbourne Theatre Company (MTC) directed by Michael Blakemore.

Several productions with MTC followed including the title role in The Good Person of Szechwan by Bertolt Brecht and the role of Beatrice-Joanna in The Changeling under the direction of John Sumner. She performed in the Australian premiere of Top Girls by Caryl Churchill with the Nimrod Theatre Company in Sydney. During this time under the direction of Bud Tingwell, McKenzie played Lynn in a 2-hour 500th special episode of Cop Shop for which she won a 1983 Penguin Award for Best Single Performance by an Actress in a Serial.

In 1985 McKenzie played the role of Lady Macbeth for the QTC. She appeared in 20 productions for this company including several premiere productions of plays by David Williamson under the direction of Aubrey Mellor. McKenzie returned to study in 1995 and was awarded a Master of Fine Arts in 1996.

As a playwright McKenzie's plays include Scattered Lives, Martha's War on War, i dot luv dot u☺ and WAY. A review of WAY in Stage Whispers said: "Sally McKenzie grips the audience's attention for a complex seventy-five minutes with an astonishing sustained theatre performance. If you love theatre, see this".

As a screenwriter and director works include documentary Actingclassof1977.com which looks at actor training in Australia in the late 1970s. The film features Steve Bisley, Mel Gibson and Debra Lawrance and first aired on the ABC in June 2008. McKenzie won an Australian Writers' Guild AWGIE Award for Best Documentary Public Broadcast in 2014.

In 2018 McKenzie was awarded a Winston Churchill Memorial Trusts Fellowship Medal for her research and subsequent paper 'Developing Australian Playwrights and their Plays'. For this paper she interviewed writers for both screen and stage living in the United States of America, Canada and the United Kingdom. The interviewees included Tony Kushner, Christopher Hampton, David Henry Hwang, Mike Leigh, Robert Lepage, David Lindsay-Abaire, Hannah Moscovitch, Judith Thompson and Enda Walsh.

== Filmography ==
=== Film ===
Title	Year	Role	Type
Cathy's Child	1979	Young Nun	Feature film
We of the Never Never	1982	Carrie	Feature film
Undercover	1983	Shop Assistant	Feature film
The Schippan Mystery	1984	Mary Schippan	TV film
Tripe	1985	Aunt Esme	Short film
Sharkey's Party	1986	Penny	Short film
With Love to the Person Next to Me	1987	Gail	Feature film
The Lonely Ones	1988	Mother	Short film
Redheads	1994	Warden Zelda	Feature film
Mermaids	2003	Georgia	TV film
Sniffer	2003	Aunt Magda	Short film
The Diamond Cutter	2003	Zelma (voice)	TV film
Actingclassof1977.com	2008	Herself	TV film
Storage	2009	Carol	Feature film
Jucy	2010	Ros	Feature film
The Day After Today	2014	Angela	Short film
Mopoke Lake Enigma	TBA	Lorna	Feature film

=== Television ===
Title	Year	Role	Type
Cop Shop	1983	Lynn	TV series, 2 hour special
Carson's Law	1983-84	Emily Forrest	TV series
Special Squad	1984	Rosetta	TV series
Mother and Son	1985	Sergeant Watts	TV series
Prisoner	1986	Roo Morgan	TV series
Rafferty's Rules	1987	Constable Prior	TV series
A Country Practice	1988	Phyllis Greenway	TV series
The Leaving of Liverpool	1993	Official Woman	TV series
The Flying Doctors	1995	Patsy Goldfisch	TV series
Fire	1995	Fai Alicis	TV series
The Wayne Manifesto	1996-97	Ms Cunningham	TV series
Fat Cow Motel	2003	Eleanor Rigby	TV miniseries
Mortified	2006-07	Mystic Marj	TV series
Reef Doctors	2013	Gracie	TV series
Harrow	2019	Beverly McIntyre	TV series
Fires	2021	Dell	TV series
Apple Cider Vinegar	2025	Amy	TV series

== Theatre ==
Year	Play	Writer(s)	Role	Notes
1976	As You Like It	William Shakespeare	Rosalind	Performed at NIDA with Steve Bisley
1976	Miss Hook of Holland	Austen Hurgon, Paul Rubens	Chorus	Performed at NIDA Director Aubrey Mellor
1977	Mother and Son	Louis Esson	Mrs. Lind	Performed at NIDA With Mel Gibson
1977	The Hostage	Brendan Behan	Kate/Meg	Performed at NIDA Shared role with Judy Davis
1977	Once in a Lifetime	George S. Kaufman, Moss Hart	Various	Performed at NIDA Director Richard Wherrett
1978	Bread & Puppet Theater	Group Devised	Ensemble	Adelaide Festival Director Peter Schumann
1978	Razzle, Dazzle	Group Devised	Various	The Actors' Company. Director Steve Agnew
1979	Visions	Louis Nowra	Madame Lynch	La Boite Theatre Company Director John Milson
1979	The Hills Family Show	Australian Performing Group	Alexandra Hills	La Boite Theatre Company Director Richard Fotheringham
1979	They Shoot Horses, Don't They?	Horace McCoy	Gloria Beatty	La Boite Theatre Company Director David Bell
1980	The Threepenny Opera	Bertolt Brecht, Kurt Weill	Jenny Diver	TN! Theatre Company Director John Milson
1980	The Importance of Being Earnest	Oscar Wilde	Gwendolen Fairfax	TN! Theatre Company Director John Milson
1980	Summit Conference	Robert David MacDonald	Eva Braun	TN! Theatre Company Director John Milson
1980	Mourning Becomes Electra	Eugene O'Neill	Lavinia Mannon	Queensland Theatre Company Director Robin Lovejoy
1980	Happy End	Bertolt Brecht, Kurt Weill	Lillian Holiday	Q Theatre. Director Doreen Warburton
1981	Mourning Becomes Electra Part One	Eugene O'Neill	Lavinia Mannon	Melbourne Theatre Company Director Michael Blakemore
1981	Mourning Becomes Electra Part Two	Eugene O'Neill	Lavinia Mannon	Melbourne Theatre Company Director Michael Blakemore
1981	The Good Person of Szechwan	Bertolt Brecht	Shen Te	Melbourne Theatre Company Director Bruce Myles
1981	The London Cuckolds	Edward Ravenscroft	Peggy	Melbourne Theatre Company Director Simon Chilvers
1981	Amadeus	Peter Shaffer	Constanze Weber	Melbourne Theatre Company Director John Sumner
1981	A Cuckoo in the Nest	Ben Travers	Marguerite Hickett	Melbourne Theatre Company Director Simon Chilvers
1982	The Changeling	Thomas Middleton, William Rowley	Beatrice-Joanna	Melbourne Theatre Company Director John Sumner
1982	Vocations	Alma De Groen	Vicki	Melbourne Theatre Company Director Graeme Blundell
1983	The Fields of Heaven	Dorothy Hewett	Lucia Silvieri	Sydney Theatre Company Director Rodney Fisher
1983	Top Girls	Caryl Churchill	Dulle Gret/Angie	Nimrod Theatre Company Director Chris Johnson
1984	A Toast to Melba	Jack Hibberd	Ensemble	Nimrod Theatre Company Director John Milson
1985	Macbeth	William Shakespeare	Lady Macbeth	Queensland Theatre Company Director Gregory Gesch
1987	Hamlet	William Shakespeare	Gertrude	Phillip St Theatre Director Beverly Blankenship
1987	Glory	Steve J. Spears	Glory	Griffin Theatre Company Director Ray Goodlass
1988	The Sentimental Bloke	C. J. Dennis, Graeme Blundell	Rose	Queensland Theatre Company Director Gregory Gesch
1988	Les Liaisons Dangereuses	Pierre Choderlos de Laclos, Christopher Hampton	Émilie	Queensland Theatre Company Director Alan Edwards
1988	Night and Day	Tom Stoppard	Ruth Carson	Queensland Theatre Company Director Gregory Gesch
1988	Beach Blanket Tempest	Denis Watkins, Chris Harriott	Regine	TN! Theatre Company Director Sean Mee
1989	The Man from Mukinupin	Dorothy Hewett	Clemmy Hummer	Queensland Theatre Company Director Aubrey Mellor
1990	SherWoodstock	Various	Mother Hood	Satirical music theatre. Director Sean Mee
1990	Top Silk	David Williamson	Jane Fredericks	Queensland Theatre Company Director Aubrey Mellor
1990	The Ring Cycle	Richard Wagner, David Bell	Frika	Queensland Performing Arts Centre Director David Bell
1991	Phantoad of the Opera	Various	Ginger	Satirical music theatre. Director Sean Mee
1991	Seven Little Australians	Ethel Turner, David Reeves	Martha/Miss Jolly	Queensland Theatre Company Director Alan Edwards
1991	Burn This	Lanford Wilson	Anna	La Boite Theatre Company Director Jennifer Flowers
1991	Money and Friends	David Williamson	Vicki Calabresi	Queensland Theatre Company Director Aubrey Mellor
1992	Money and Friends	David Williamson	Vicki Calabresi	Sydney Theatre Company
1992	Money and Friends	David Williamson	Vicki Calabresi	Melbourne Theatre Company
1992	Money and Friends	David Williamson	Vicki Calabresi	State Theatre Company of South Australia
1992	Fuenteovejuna	Lope de Vega	Ensemble	Melbourne International Arts Festival Director Aubrey Mellor
1993	Romeo and Juliet	William Shakespeare	Lady Capulet	Queensland Theatre Company Director Aubrey Mellor
1993	Diving for Pearls	Katherine Thomson	Marg	Queensland Theatre Company Director David Berthold
1994	Dancing at Lughnasa	Brian Friel	Maggie	Queensland Theatre Company Director Jennifer Flowers
1994	The Servant of Two Masters	Carlo Goldoni	Ensemble	Queensland Performing Arts Centre Director Steven Gration
1994	Happy Birthday Tim	Sally McKenzie	Mum	Queensland Performing Arts Centre Director Sean Mee
1997	After the Ball	David Williamson	Maureen	Queensland Theatre Company Director Robyn Nevin
1997	After the Ball	David Williamson	Maureen	Theatre Royal, Hobart, Arts Centre Melbourne
2000	Top Dogs	Urs Widmer	Penelope McDonald	Queensland Theatre Company Director Jennifer Flowers
2002	Salt	Peta Murray	Meg	La Boite Theatre Company Director Michael Futcher
2003	A Conversation	David Williamson	Barbara Milson	Queensland Theatre Company Director Jean-Marc Russ
2004	The Cherry Orchard	Anton Chekhov	Lyubov Ranevskaya	Queensland Theatre Company Director Michael Gow
2004	Amigos	David Williamson	Hilary	La Boite Theatre Company Director Sean Mee
2005	The Memory of Water	Shelagh Stephenson	Vi	Queensland Theatre Company Director Leticia Cáceres
2007	Red Cap	Janis Balodis, Iain Grandage	Ensemble	La Boite Theatre Company Director Sean Mee
2007	The Wishing Well	Helen Howard, Michael Futcher	Ensemble	La Boite Theatre Company Director Michael Futcher
2009	The School of Arts	Bille Brown	Gwen Frawley	Queensland Theatre Company Playhouse Theatre, Brisbane. Director Michael Gow
2009	The School of Arts	Bille Brown	Gwen Frawley	Pilbeam Theatre, Rockhampton
2012	A Hoax	Rick Viede	Ronnie	La Boite Theatre Company, Griffin Theatre Company Director Lee Lewis
2022	Betty	Jules Allen	Rose	Theatre Works Director Iain Sinclair
2023	Way	Sally McKenzie	Lily, Lynne, Maysie, Zahra	La Mama Theatre (Melbourne) Director Sean Mee
2024	Way	Sally McKenzie	Lily, Lynne, Maysie, Zahra	fortyfivedownstairs Director Sean Mee

== Awards ==
Year	Work	Award	Result
1983	Cop Shop	Penguin Award Best Single Performance by an Actress in a Serial	Won
2014	A Woman's Journey into Sex	Australian Writers' Guild AWGIE Award Best Documentary Public Broadcast	Won
