= Fran (film) =

- Directed by: Glenda Hambly
- Written by: Glenda Hambly
- Produced by: David Rapsey
- Starring: Noni Hazlehurst; Annie Byron; Alan Fletcher
- Cinematography: Jan Kenny
- Edited by: Tai Tang Thien
- Music by: Greg Schultz
- Distributed by: Barron Films
- Release date: 14 November 1985
- Running time: 98 minutes
- Country: Australia
- Language: English
- Budget: A$700,000
- Box office: A$111,903

Fran is a 1985 Australian film directed by Glenda Hambly, with Noni Hazlehurst in the title role. Fran is a mother who abandons her children in favour of a romantic life after her husband leaves her. It was filmed in Perth, Western Australia, Australia.

== Awards ==
Fran was nominated for an AFI Awards in three categories (Best Actress in a Supporting Role, Best Director, Best Film). It won AFI Awards in the Best Actress in a Lead Role (Noni Hazlehurst), Best Actress in a Supporting Role (Annie Byron) and Best Original Screenplay (Glenda Hambly) categories.

== Cast ==
- Noni Hazlehurst as Fran
- Annie Byron as Marge
- Alan Fletcher as Jeff
- Narelle Simpson as Lisa
- Travis Ward as Tom
- Rosie Logie as Cynthia
- Danny Adcock as Ray
- Steve Jodrell as Michael Butlin
- Penny Brown as Sally Aspinal
- Faith Clayton as Waigani Supervisor

== Production ==
Glenda Hambly was commissioned by the Western Australia Department for Community Services to make a film about the problems of a single mother and she convinced them to let her make it as a drama. The producers pre-sold the movie to Channel Seven and it was made as a telemovie but was released theatrically.

=== Box office ===
Fran grossed $111,903 at the box office in Australia.

== See also ==
- Cinema of Australia
