= Michael Darragh =

Australian theatre director

Michael Robert Darragh (born 4 March 1975 in Gold Coast, Australia) is a theatre producer and director as well as writer and occasional performer.

== Theatre credits ==
- 2008: director, producer - Beautiful Thing by Jonathan Harvey at Zhijiang Dream Factory, Shanghai, China.
- 1999: assistant director - The Amaranth at Bondi Pavilion Theatre, Sydney, Australia.
- 1999: director, designer - Making Porn by Ronnie Larsen for Jacobsen Entertainment at Seymour Theatre, Sydney, Australia.
- 1998: director, co-producer - Beautiful Thing by Jonathan Harvey for Make Believe Productions at Studio Theatre, Sydney, Australia.
- 1997: director, co-producer - Salam Shalom: A Tale of Passion by Saleem for Make Believe Productions at PACT Theatre, Sydney, Australia.
- 1997: director, designer - The Ugly Man by Brad Fraser for Darlinghurst Theatre at Wayside Theatre, Sydney, Australia.
- 1996: actor - When You Comin' Back Red Ryder? for Darlinghurst Theatre at Wayside Theatre, Sydney, Australia.
- 1996: actor - Landscape of the Body directed by Glenn Terry for Darlinghurst Theatre at Wayside Theatre, Sydney, Australia.
