= Beautiful Thing (play) =

1993 play by Jonathan Harvey

- Written by: Jonathan Harvey
- Genre: Comedy
- Setting: Council estate, South London

Premiere
- Date: 1993

Beautiful Thing is a 1993 British play written by Jonathan Harvey. A screen adaptation of the play was released in 1996 by Channel 4 Films, with a revised screenplay also by Harvey.

== Plot of the Screen Version ==
The story is set in Thamesmead, a working class area of South East London dominated by post-war council estates.

Jamie, a teen who is infatuated with his classmate, Steve, has to deal with his single mother Sandra, who is preoccupied with ambitious plans to run her own pub and with an ever-changing string of lovers, the latest of whom is Tony, a neo-hippie. Sandra finds herself at odds with Leah, a sassy and rude neighbour who has been expelled from school, does several drugs, and constantly listens and sings along to her mother's Cass Elliot records. While Jamie's homosexuality remains concealed, his introvert nature and dislike of football are reason enough for his classmates to bully him at every opportunity.

Ste, who is living together with his drug-dealing brother and abusive, alcoholic father in the flat next door, is one night beaten by his father so badly that Sandra takes pity and lets him sleep over. In the absence of a third bed, Ste has to make do with sleeping 'top-to-toe' with Jamie. On the second night they share a bed: after a massage and a minor conversation, the boys soon change sleeping arrangements and Jamie kisses Ste for the first time.

The next morning, Ste panics and leaves before Jamie awakens, avoiding him for days. Jamie works up the nerve to steal a Gay Times from a newsagent, apparently starting to accept his sexuality and affection for Ste. Jamie finally spots Ste at a nearby party and confronts him; they prepare to leave together. The party ends badly, with Sandra taking vengeance on Leah for gossiping, who then threatens to 'spill the beans' about Ste and Jamie and confesses to having covered up for Ste in front of his father and brother. Ste reacts poorly, angrily rejecting Jamie and running away.

Slowly, Ste accepts Jamie's love and their relationship begins to develop as they visit a gay pub together. Sandra follows them and discovers their secret, and the story reaches its climax as a bad trip by Leah (on an unnamed drug) precipitates Sandra's breakup with Tony; the news of Sandra's new job comes out; and Sandra confronts Ste and Jamie. Sandra comes to accept her son's relationship.

The play ends with the two boys slow-dancing in the courtyard of their council flats to the Cass Elliot song "Dream a Little Dream of Me", while a guarding Sandra dances defiantly at their side with Leah as the local residents look on; some of them shocked, some of them enjoying the moment themselves.

== Theatrical productions ==
- 28 July 1993 (World premiere): Bush Theatre, London, directed by Hettie MacDonald. It featured Patricia Kerrigan, Mark Letheren, Jonny Lee Miller, Sophie Stanton and Philip Glenister.
- 29 March 1994: West End at the Donmar Warehouse which ran until 23 April 1994, with Amelda Brown, Mark Letheren, Shaun Dingwall, Sophie Stanton and Hugh Bonneville
- 26 September 1994: West End at the Duke of York's Theatre, with Amelda Brown, Zubin Varla, Richard Dormer, Diane Parish and Rhys Ifans.
- February 1998 (Australian premiere): Directed by Michael Darragh and produced by Make Believe Productions in Sydney. An official Sydney Gay and Lesbian Mardi Gras festival event, the critically acclaimed independent production starred Simon Corfield (Jamie), Natalie Murray (Leah), Fiona Harris (Sandra), Andrew Wallace (Ste) and Charles Kevin (Tony).
- 16 May 1998 (American premiere): Produced by Famous Door Theater Company in Chicago, Illinois.
- 10 August 1998: (Edinburgh Festival Fringe premiere): Southbridge Resource Centre, Edinburgh, directed by Dan Hyde. Produced by The Absolute Banana Theatre Company.
- 14 February 1999 (New York City premiere): Cherry Lane Theatre in New York, New York.
- 13 May 1999: Rotherham Arts Centre, directed by Darren Rhodes. Produced by Out of the Blue Theatre Company.
- 5 August 2002: Southbridge Resource Centre, Edinburgh, directed by Dan Hyde. Produced by The About Turn Theatre Company.
- 21 August to 26 August 2002: Marlborough Theatre, Brighton, directed by Dave Brinson. Produced by Grassy Knoll Theatre Company.
- November 2002: Coliseum Theatre, Oldham, Greater Manchester
- April 2003: Ball State University directed by AJ Wright, starring Nick Mitchell (Jamie), Katie Rae (Sandra), Matt Owens (Ste), Amy Hendrickson (Leah), and Ed Rice (Tony).
- November 2005: Leicester Haymarket Theatre starring Jeremy Legat (Jamie), Spencer Charles Noll (Ste), Kate Wood (Sandra), Gracy Goldman (Leah) and Adam Blake (Tony).
- January to March 2006: Sound Theatre in London starring Andrew Garfield, Gavin Brocker, Leo Bill, Sophie Stanton and Naomi Bentley.
- July to September 2006: Sound Theatre in London starring Jonathan Bailey, Gavin Brocker, Steven Meo, Carli Norris and Michelle Terry.
- September 2007: South London Theatre This was the first performance by actors of the same age (and younger) as the characters they portrayed. Directed by Elaine Heath, produced by Stuart Draper of Melmoth. Starring David Clements as Jamie, Tom Bucher as Ste, Rita Goodhead as Leah, Fiona Cullen as Sandra and Chris Learmouth as Tony.
- 31 October to 3 November 2007: Drama Studio, University of Sheffield by SuTCo.
- 11 January 2008 (German premiere): Junges Theater Bonn. Notably this is a performance with actors being the same age as the characters they portray.
- February 2008: Soulstice Theatre in Milwaukee, Wisconsin, directed by Mark E. Schuster. The cast features Zach Kunde as Jamie, Chris Darnieder as Ste, Jillian Smith as Sandra, Amanda Carson as Leah, and Doug Giffin as Tony.
- 1 May 2008: Directed and acted by Fever theatre at Hemsworth Arts and Community College. The production features Kyle Crookes, (Jamie) Aaron Peace, (Tony) Joss Froggatt, (Ste) Stacey Young, (Leah) and Lauren Raynor (Sandra). The script has been cut to a thirty-minute runtime.
- 26 June 2008: Produced by EM-LOU PRODUCTIONS at the Battersea Arts Centre, Directed by Peter Darney, featuring Harry Bradshaw as Jamie, Niall Phillips as Ste, Anna Stolli as Sandra, Finn Hanlon as Tony, Louise Tyler as Leah.
- 15 July 2008: Produced by the Hillyer Theatre Company at the Everyman Theatre in Cheltenham, directed by Jack Fayter, with Richard Loftus as Jamie, Joel Stubbs as Ste, Evelyne Beech as Sandra, Megan Travers as Leah and Steve Roberts as Tony.
- 12 December 2008: Produced and directed by Michael Darragh at Zhijiang Dream Factory, Shanghai, China. Featuring Joakim Eriksson (Jamie), Sophie Lloyd (Leah), Christy Shapiro (Sandra), Derek Kwan (Ste) and JP Lopez (Tony).
- 9 January to 1 March 2009 (Paris/French language premiere): Le Vingtième Théâtre, Paris. Directed by Kester Lovelace. A Drama Ties Production. Featuring Matila Malliarakis (Jaimie), Ivan Cori (Ste), Tadrina Hocking / Delphine Lacouque (Sandra), Simon Hubert (Tony) and Aude-Laurence Clermont (Leah). Translation : Pascal Crantelle.
- May 2009 (Gent/Dutch language premiere) Directed by Fabio Van Hoorebeke. Featuring Pieter Van Nieuwenhuyze (Jonas), Bert Verbeke (Steve), Chadia Cambie (Sandra), Steve De Schepper (Tony) and Jolijn Antonissen (Leah).
- 10 February to 20 February 2010 (Alberta premiere): Walterdale Playhouse, Edmonton. Directed by Justen Bennett. Featuring Doran Werner (Jamie), Maura Frunza (Leah), Amelia Duplessis (Sandra), Joel Taras (Ste), and Randy Brososky (Tony).
- April 22–24, 2010: Oberlin College in Oberlin, OH, directed by Matthew Wright, starring Linus Ignatius (Jamie), David Ohana (Ste), Hannah Finn (Sandra), Hallie Haas (Leah), and Andrew Gombas (Tony).
- 19 May to 2 June 2010: Directed by Andrew Cuthbertson at Bath Spa University Theatre, Bath, The Egg Theatre, Bath, the Tacchi-Morris Arts Centre in Taunton, the Tower in Winchester and The Drill Hall in London. Featuring Adam James Green as Jamie, Pete Peasey as Ste, Grace K. Miller as Sandra, Daniel Harland as Tony, and Aimee Farey as Leah.
- 16–24 July 2010: Tasmanian Premiere directed by Glenn Braithwaite, presented by the Old Nick Theatre Company at the Peacock Theatre in Hobart, Tasmania.
- 9 November to 3 December 2011: Directed by Sarah Frankcom at the Royal Exchange Theatre, Manchester. Featuring Matthew Tennyson as Jamie, Tommy Vine as Ste, Tara Hodge as Leah, Claire-Louise Cordwell as Sandra and Alex Price as Tony.
- 9 February to 25 February 2012: Directed by Stephen M. Raeburn at the Browncoat Pub and Theatre, Wilmington. Featuring Kenny Rosander as Jamie, Ryan P. C. Trimble as Ste, Anna Gamel as Leah, Terrie Batson as Sandra, and Charles Auten as Tony. Regional premiere.
- 28 January to 29 January 2013: Directed by Peter Hynds and produced by TS Theatre Productions in Swindon, UK; performed at The Arts Centre, Swindon. This production starred Dominic Baker (Jamie), Josh Foyster (Ste), Sarah Lewis (Sandra), Ella Thomas (Leah), and Howard Trigg (Tony).
- 14 February to 2 March 2013: Directed by Brandon Martignago and produced by Burley Theatre in Sydney as an official Sydney Gay and Lesbian Mardi Gras festival event. This 20th anniversary production starred Michael Brindley (Jamie), Stephanie King (Leah), Amanda Stephans Lee (Sandra), Luke Willing (Ste) and Andrew Hearle (Tony).
- April to May 2013 Arts Theatre in London's West End.
- 30 April to 30 May 2013: Directed by JP Quirk and produced by Jeannine Collins in Batavia, IL. USA. This 20th anniversary production starred Timothy Vogel (Jamie), [Kasia Karbarz (Leah), Erin Cauley (Sandra), Michael Sherry (Ste), Tony Pelligrino (Tony) and Jon Witt (Ronnie). Photos - Facebook
- 24 July to 26 July 2015: Directed by Lawkin Law, translated by 我要真翻譯 and produced by Theatrideo in Hong Kong, at the Hong Kong Cultural Centre. This production starred Koch Fung Koon Ho 馮小西 (Jamie), Joe Chan 陳祖 (Ste), Angle Kwok Lai Man 郭麗敏 (Sandra), Clara Ho Wing Yee 何潁怡 (Leah), and Romeo Wong Chun Kit 王俊傑 (Tony). Photos - Facebook
- 21 February 2017: Directed by Ryan Gooderham at Thurston Community College, Beyton. Starring Matthew Gibson (Jamie), Charlie Stannard (Ste), Aisling Brooks (Sandra), Imogen Turnbow (Leah) and Daniel McKeown (Tony).
- 1 June to 29 June 2018: 25th anniversary production at Above The Stag Theatre.
- 3 July to 7 July 2018: Open air, site-specific dance-theatre adaptation performed on the Thamesmead housing estate where the play is set and the 1996 Beautiful Thing (film) was shot. Co-Directed by Bradley Hemmings and Robby Graham and produced by Haitham Ridha as part of Greenwich+Docklands International Festival - Beautiful Thing, 3-7 July 2018, Greenwich+Docklands International Festival.
- 11 October to 27 October 2018: In-house production by Tobacco Factory Theatres, Bristol. Directed by Mike Tweddle and starring Finn Hanlon as Tony, Amy-Leigh Hickman as Leah, Ted Reilly as Jamie, Phoebe Thomas as Sandra and Tristan Waterson as Ste.
- 19 to 23 November 2019: Cambridge University theatre production at The Corpus Playroom. Directed by Lucy Green and starring Theo Collins as Ste, Maria Pointer as Sandra, Mojola Akinyemi as Leah, Theo Tompkins as Jamie and Mithiran Ravindran as Tony.
- 2 February to 6 March 2021: Presented by New Theatre, Newtown, Sydney as part of the 2021 Sydney Gay and Lesbian Mardi Gras. Directed by Mark Nagle and starring Caspar Hardaker, Julia Kennedy Scott, Will Manton, Bayley Prendergast, Hannah Zaslawski - https://newtheatre.org.au/beautiful-thing/
- 6 May to 7 May 2022: Directed by Miguel Rosa and associate directed by Anoushka Medina, produced by Nueva Escena PR in San Juan, Puerto Rico. Starring Julián Gilormini as Jamie, Luis Obed Velázquez as Ste, Yamaris Latorre as Sandra, María Luisa "Mussa" Marín as Leah, and Hector Enrique Rodríguez as Tony.
- 25 to 27 May 2023: Directed by Elinor Lower for Bristol School of Acting at Tobacco Factory Theatre. Starring Dominic Delahaye as Jamie, Kieran Thomas as Ste, Olivia Zena Stronach as Sandra, Emily Clough as Leah and Harry Hudson as Tony. -https://tobaccofactorytheatres.com/shows/beautiful-thing-2/
- 3-13 December 2025: Directed by Finn Stannard for the Company of Dramatic Arts (CODA) at QTOPIA Sydney in Darlinghurst. Starring Jake Walker as Jamie, Max Dÿkstra as Ste, Willa King as Sandra, Poppy Cozens as Leah and Michael Hogg as Tony.
