= With Love to the Person Next to Me =

- Directed by: Brian McKenzie
- Written by: Brian McKenzie
- Produced by: John Cruthers
- Starring: Kym Gyngell; Paul Chubb; Sally McKenzie; Barry Dickins
- Cinematography: Ray Argall
- Release date: 1987
- Running time: 98 minutes
- Country: Australia
- Language: English
- Budget: AU $120,000

With Love to the Person Next to Me is a 1987 film directed by Brian McKenzie and starring Kym Gyngell.

== Cast ==
- Kym Gyngell as Wallace
- Paul Chubb as Syd
- Sally McKenzie as Gail
- Barry Dickins
- Peter Hosking
- Mark Mitchell as Salesman in Taxi

== Production ==
The film was funded by the Creative Development Branch of the Australian Film Commission and Film Victoria and was shot over three weeks on 16mm.

== Release ==
According to McKenzie the film ran for three weeks in a Melbourne cinema, got reviews and didn't make any money:

It's all about the sounds that you hear, the sounds that you replay, the various sounds that represent the different parties in the flats and how they impinge on the lead character's life.

The film is a good example of the tough and thoughtful indi films made in the 80's and earlier with tiny crews and penny farthing budgets. It has been restored (by Ray Argall, the films cinematographer)
