= Actingclassof1977.com =

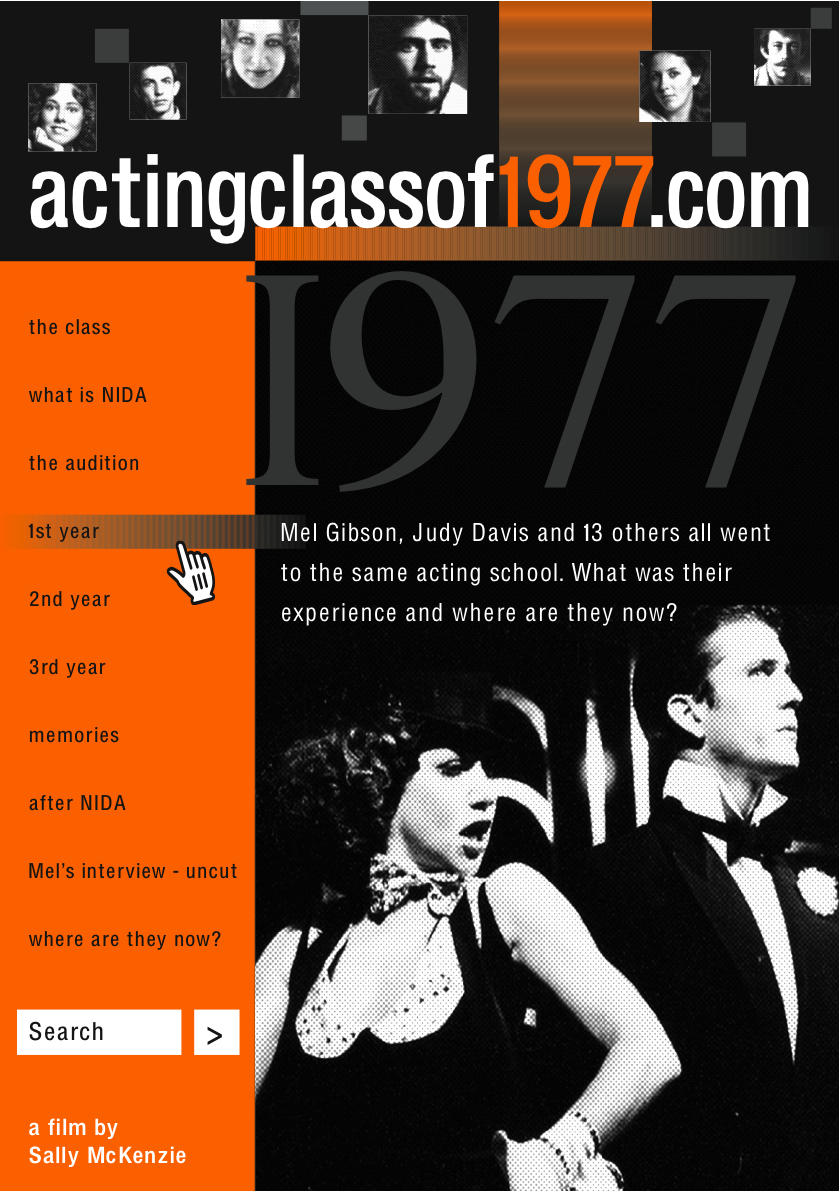
- Also known as: Acting Class of 1977
- Written by: Sally McKenzie
- Directed by: Sally McKenzie
- Starring: Steve Bisley; Annie Byron; John Francis; Mel Gibson; Debra Lawrance; Sally McKenzie; Aubrey Mellor; Robert Menzies; Linda Newton; Monroe Reimers
- Narrated by: Sally McKenzie
- Theme music composer: Nick Stewart
- Country of origin: Australia
- Original language: English

Production
- Producer: Sally McKenzie
- Production locations: Brisbane, Hobart, Melbourne, Sydney
- Cinematography: Roman Baska; Jonas McQuiggin
- Editor: Ben Ambrose
- Running time: 52 minutes
- Production company: theCoalface

Original release
- Network: ABC
- Release: 25 May 2008

Actingclassof1977.com, or Acting Class of 1977, is a 2008 Australian documentary television film that looks at the Australian entertainment industry and the actor-training practices of the National Institute of Dramatic Art (NIDA) during the 1970s. Written, directed and produced by Sally McKenzie, the documentary premiered on the ABC on 25 May 2008.

== Film ==
The documentary covers the experiences of acting students attending NIDA in Sydney, Australia between the years 1975 to 1977. The narrative structure of this film is unusual because it is framed as though the viewer is accessing a website. One of the students, filmmaker Sally McKenzie, clicks through a series of webpages to uncover memories of 10 students and their three years of training. The film contains interviews with Steve Bisley, Annie Byron, John Francis, Mel Gibson, Debra Lawrance, Sally McKenzie, Aubrey Mellor, Robert Menzies, Linda Newton and Monroe Reimers. Judy Davis declined to be in the film.

== Synopsis ==
A member of the Acting Class of 1977 logs onto a fictitious website. Using the cursor they navigate the site to find ‘The Class’: a group that spent three years together in a demanding acting course. In an interview Mel Gibson remembers that they were “some of the best years of my life.” Other website pages include the class’ recollections of their audition, training days and experiences since graduating. “I wanted to work, I enjoyed working,” Gibson tells McKenzie. “The novelty of being noticed, of getting famous, wore off very fast, so that aspect of it has been the biggest pain in my arse.” Acting Class of 1977 addresses the craft of acting, the experiences of Australian acting students and the entertainment industry.

== Reception ==
The Australian wrote that writer/director Sally McKenzie created a "witty new documentary" that is a "droll look at the nature of actors, what it's like to become one and the toll that their careers take.” They further noted that “As her documentary opens, a large bottle of scotch at McKenzie's elbow gives the game away; she's like a classic female private investigator trawling the past to understand the present. Like a crime writer's heroine, her commentary is delivered with a kind of caustic compassion, trying to bring some humanity and justice into the frequently uncaring world of acting. The private eye conceit is a nice idea.” Of NIDA they summarized that “There's little doubt the National Institute of Dramatic Art was an awful experience for some people. The tutors were contradictory and sometimes seemed to be as much in the dark about acting as their students.” The courses offered tended to be psychoanalytic in teaching students how to bear up under "the industry's tendency to humiliate and degrade actors," but McKenzie revealed that nothing in their training "prepared them for the callousness of the marketplace, where appearance was everything."

The Sydney Morning Herald focused on Mel Gibson’s interview where, when asked about his time at NIDA he said, “I had some really good highs but some very low lows.” The article noted that none of the class of 1977 students interviewed for the project thought that Gibson or Davis would be as successful as they have been. "Theatre was very much the focus of our training," McKenzie said, "The thought of people being stars [in film and television] or having stellar careers was not really considered." When asked about how she recollected Gibson from their NIDA years, McKenzie remembered the young Gibson as “very polite, self-deprecating, shy, certainly talented and just a really nice person … even a little bit embarrassed about the whole acting thing.”
