= Festival Fatale =

Theatre festival

Festival Fatale, sometimes called the WITS Festival Fatale, was an all-female theatre festival in Sydney, Australia organized by Women in Theatre and Screen (WITS) in partnership with the Darlinghurst Theatre Company and the Eternity Playhouse to celebrate the work of Australian women. It launched in 2016 as part of WITS' larger work advocating for gender representation on stage and includes readings and staged plays. The inaugural festival drew more than one hundred submissions, all written by women with female protagonists, which were narrowed down to twenty programs during the festival.

Tara Clark was general manager and producer of the Festival as part of her work with WITS.
