= Madame Lynch =

Coordinates: 25.2718°S 57.5583°W

- Barrio
- Interactive map of Madame Lynch
- Country: Paraguay
- Autonomous Capital District: Gran Asunción
- City: Asunción

Madame Lynch is a neighbourhood (barrio) of Asunción, Paraguay.
