= Darlinghurst Theatre =

Australian theatre company

- Interactive map of Darlinghurst Theatre
- Location: Burton Street Tabernacle; 39 Burton Street, Darlinghurst, Sydney, New South Wales
- Coordinates: 33°52′43″S 151°12′58″E

Darlinghurst Theatre was an theatre company based at the Eternity Playhouse in Darlinghurst, New South Wales. The company ran from in 1992 to 2024 and it went into voluntary administration in June 2024.

== History ==
Glenn Terry established an amateur drama school in Darlinghurst entitled Darlinghurst Drama with the profits from the school to be used to start a professional theatre company to be called Darlinghurst Theatre. From 1993 to 2000 productions were originally based at the Wayside Chapel in the heart of Kings Cross. A devastating hailstorm in 1999 destroyed its roof and the company looked for a new home. South Sydney Council assisted by providing a venue with affordable rent in what was known as the Reginald Murphy Hall on Greenknowe Ave in Elizabeth Bay.

In 2001, with financial support from the New South Wales Ministry of the Arts, The Grosvenor Club and numerous individuals, $500,000 worth of internal renovations was completed by Glenn Terry and friends, many of whom were jobbing actors, writers and directors. At the time of the renovations, Sydney's Her Majesty's Theatre was closed and some of that theatre's equipment found a new home at the new Darlinghurst Theatre, including 111 red velvet seats, dressing room mirrors, lighting and bar equipment.

The Darlinghust Theatre Company operated in Elizabeth Bay from 2001 till 2013. At the venue the company co produced over 100 professional co operative theatre productions in collaboration with independent artists with a focus on new Australian and new international playscripts. Paying artists at professional rates was a priority for Terry and the company, and to this end the company grew its capacity.

In 2007 the company developed a touring initiative entitled Critical Stages which developed professional tours of outstanding independent productions. The initiative gave successful independent productions a second life through regional and inter city touring. To strum up touring interest, Terry and touring manager Sean Pardy personally visited over 100 different touring venues across Australia to spruik touring productions. Darlinghurst Theatre self funded the initial tours to regional NSW which led to the initiative receiving funding support from The Australia Council and Arts NSW from 2009. Larger National tours were developed and were funded by Playing Australia and in 2011 Critical Stages incorporated as separate stand alone company with its own staff, resources and funding support. The company ran from 2011 to 2023 and provided work for 100s of young professional artists. The company was dissolved in 2023.

Another significant initiative that Darlinghurst Theatre developed was Milk Crate Theatre. In 2000 South Sydney Council approached the company to develop a performance with homeless and disadvantage people at Wesley Missions Edward Eagar Lodge in Darlinghurst. At the time local residents near the lodge where complaining to Council about the clients at Edward Eagar Lodge. Terry proposed on going public performances which would tell the stories of clients from the lodge. Using Augusto Boal's forum theatre as a basis, Milk Crate Theatre was developed. Workshops were run at the lodge followed by public performances, performed by a team of professional performers and clients from the Lodge. Darlinghurst Theatre ran Milkcrate theatre from 2000 to 2011 and developed Milk Crate Theatre into a stand alone theatre company with its own staff and funding. Milk Crate Theatre incorporated in 2011 and continues to run as a theatre company. https://www.milkcratetheatre.com/

In 2008 The City of Sydney approached the company to participate in the development of a new theatre venue in Darlinghurst as part of its plans to activate the Darlinghurst precinct and the Elizabeth Bay building was to be sold. Darlinghurst Theatre Company, along with many theatre artists and residents petitioned the City of Sydney to retain the Elizabeth Bay building as a theatre venue. The petition was successful and Darlinghurst Theatre Company donated the theatre's fit-out and equipment to the City of Sydney. New tenants were found for the venue and it was renamed the Hayes Theatre in 2014.

From 2008 to 2013 Glenn Terry collaborated with the City of Sydney on the design of new theatre which was to be the 200 seat Eternity Playhouse. Terry was seeking a more sustainable theatre with a larger seating capacity which would enable it better pay artists and better resource productions. The company expanded by moving to the newly refurbished Eternity Playhouse on Burton St, Darlinghurst, with the assistance of the City of Sydney and Arts NSW, in November 2013. Terry continued as artistic and executive director, bringing a dedicated team over with him to The Eternity Playhouse.

From 2016 until 2018, the theatre partnered with Women in Theatre and Screen (WITS) to present an annual all-female theatre festival called Festival Fatale. It launched in 2016 as part of WITS' larger work advocating for gender representation on stage and includes readings and staged plays.

Terry retired as executive director in February 2022, after leading the company for 30 years. In the lead up to his retirement Amylia Harris was appointed co-artistic director who took over as Artistic Director in 2022, until stepping away in 2023 for family reasons.

In June 2024, Darlinghurst Theatre was placed into voluntary administration.

== Productions ==
- 1993: Waiting For Godot, the inaugural production by DTC in the Wayside Chapel; however, the all-female cast upset Samuel Beckett's estate, so was forced to close after one week
- 1996: Landscape of the Body by John Guare (directed by Glenn Terry)
- 1996: Underwear, Perfume and Crash Helmet by Michael Gurr
- 1996: When You Comin' Back Red Ryder? by Mark Medoff (directed by Chrissy Ynfante)
- 1997: The Ugly Man by Brad Fraser (directed by Michael Darragh)
- 1998: Frozen (directed by Chrissy Ynfante)
- 1999: The Next Big Thing (directed by Matthew John Stewart)
- 2001: The Woolgatherer by William Mastosimone; inaugural production in the new theatre space on Greenknowe Ave
- 2005: Terminus by Daniel Keane
- 2005: Onna No Honour
- 2005: The Young Tycoons by Christopher Johnson
- 2006: Blue Eyes and Heels by Toby Whithouse
- 2007: The Bee by Hideki Noda and Colin Teevan (directed by Sarah Enright)
- 2009: The Kursk by Sasha Janowicz (directed by Michael Futcher)
- 2011: 10,000 beersby Alex Broun (directed by Lee Lewis)
- 2012: Ordinary Days by Adam Gwon (directed by Grace Barnes) in conjunction with Squabbalogic
- 2013: All My Sons by Arthur Miller; the inaugural production for the Eternity Playhouse
- 2022: Let the Right One In, directed by Alexander Berlage and presented by arrangement with Marla Rubin Productions. Will McDonald played Oskar, while Ell was played by Sebrina Thornton-Walker.
