= Kylie Coolwell =

Indigenous Australian actor and playwright

Kylie Coolwell is an Indigenous Australian actor and playwright best known as the author of the play Battle of Waterloo (2015).

== Early life and education ==
Coolwell attended the Aboriginal Centre for the Performing Arts. In 2007, she graduated from the National Institute of Dramatic Art, where she studied acting.

== Career ==
In 2013, Coolwell had a minor role in the first episode of the television series Redfern Now.

In 2015, Coolwell published her debut play Battle of Waterloo about an Indigenous Australian family living in a Housing NSW apartment in Waterloo, New South Wales. She initially began writing Battle of Waterloo as part of a writing exercise for Redfern Salon, a program for Indigenous playwrights run by Play Writing Australia.

Battle of Waterloo debuted at the Sydney Theatre Company and was directed by Sarah Goodes. The play was well received by critics, receiving positive reviews in The Daily Telegraph, Daily Review, and The Sydney Morning Herald. It was shortlisted for the Nick Enright Prize for Playwriting at the NSW Premier's Literary Awards in 2016.
