= Steve Bisley =

Australian actor (born 1951)

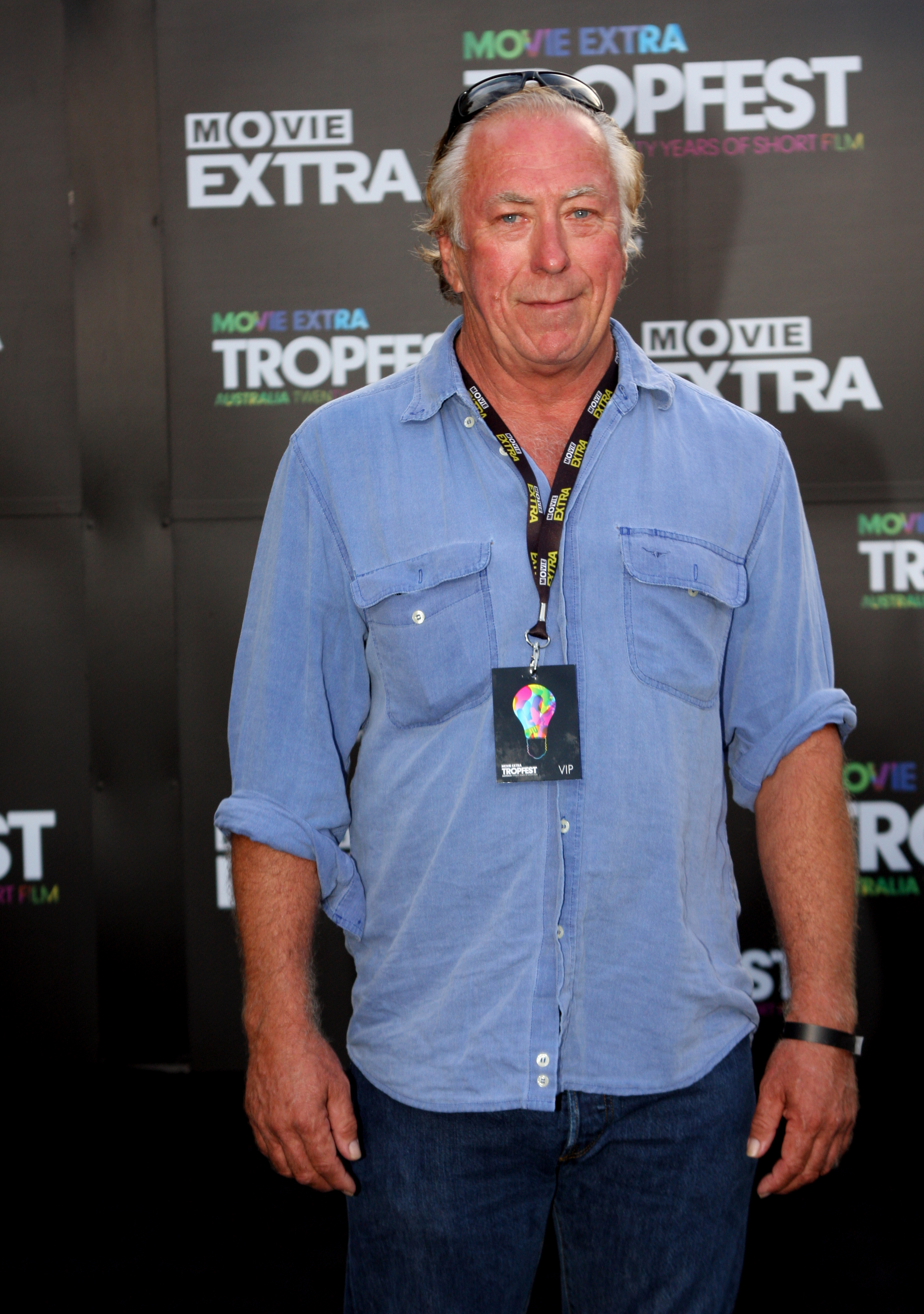
- Bisley in February 2012
- Born: 26 December 1951 (age 74); Lake Munmorah, New South Wales, Australia
- Education: National Institute of Dramatic Art (1977)
- Occupations: Actor, writer
- Years active: 1968–present
- Known for: Mad Max as Jim Goose (1979); The Big Steal as Gordon Farkas (1990); The Great Gatsby as Dan Cody (2013); Water Rats as DS Jack Christey (1998–2001); Doctor Doctor as Jim Knight (2016–2018)
- Spouse: Sally Burleigh (m. 2000; div. 2006)
- Children: 6

Steve Bisley (born 26 December 1951) is an Australian actor and writer. He is best known for his roles in the films Mad Max (1979) and The Great Gatsby (2013). On television, some of his better-known roles include Detective Sergeant Jack Christey in Water Rats and Jim Knight in Doctor Doctor.

== Early life ==
Bisley was born at Lake Munmorah, New South Wales and grew up on a small farm called Stillways. The son of schoolteachers, he moved to Sydney just after his seventeenth birthday. After a few years of working in various jobs, he enrolled in the National Institute of Dramatic Art (NIDA), graduating with a degree in acting in 1977. Other actors in his class included Mel Gibson, Judy Davis, Debra Lawrance and Sally McKenzie.

== Career ==
While still training at NIDA, Bisley and his friend Mel Gibson made their film debuts in Summer City (1977). Towards the end of the course, they were approached by director George Miller and asked to audition for parts in Mad Max (1979). Both were successful and Bisley went on to play Jim 'Goose', the best friend and partner to Gibson's titular character. Mad Max has since become a cult classic and it launched Gibson to mainstream stardom. After this, Bisley played the lead role in the thriller The Chain Reaction (1980), with Gibson making a brief appearance. His other early film credits include roles in The Highest Honor (1983), The Winds of Jarrah (1983), Fast Talking (1984) and Silver City (1984).

In 1980, Bisley played Joe Byrne in The Last Outlaw, a critically acclaimed TV miniseries about Ned Kelly. He was also seen in A Town Like Alice, The Boy in the Bush and the original 1985 miniseries of the medical drama The Flying Doctors.

In 1986, he and his family temporarily relocated to London where he took the lead role in the BBC series Call Me Mister.

Back in Australia, he played the lead role in the 1988 TV movie The Clean Machine. For his role as Inspector Ed Riordan, he won the Best Actor in a One-off Drama accolade at the 1988 Penguin Awards. In 1990 he co-starred with Ben Mendelsohn in the cult teen comedy The Big Steal. His performance as shonky car salesman Gordon Farkas remains one of his most remembered roles.

In 1992, Bisley joined the cast of Police Rescue, playing Senior Sergeant Kevin 'Nipper' Harris. He appeared in 29 episodes, leaving in 1995. He was next seen as Dr Henry King in the ABC series G.P. After this, he became a regular in the third and final season of the critically acclaimed satirical television series Frontline.

In 1998, he began to appear as a guest in Nine’s police drama series Water Rats, playing Detective Jack Christey. The following year, he became one of the lead actors on the show, replacing Colin Friels who had quit due to ill health. Bisley left the show in 2001, but it turned out that his final episode was also the series’ swansong.

Also a stage actor, Bisley has appeared in drama productions. His stage roles include parts in Ray Lawler's Summer of the Seventeenth Doll (1985 and 1995) and as Banjo Paterson in the musical theatre production of The Man from Snowy River: Arena Spectacular (2002). In 2003, he presented a season of television documentaries on the National Geographic Channel.

From 2007 to 2009, Bisley played CMDR Steve Marshall in Sea Patrol. From 2016 to 2018, he was seen in the first two series of Doctor Doctor, playing the father of the lead character. In 2016, he appeared as Harry Firth in the two-part Australian miniseries Brock on Network Ten. The miniseries was based on the life of Australian motor racing legend Peter Brock.

In 2013, Bisley appeared as Dan Cody in Baz Luhrmann's adaptation of The Great Gatsby. He was also seen in the Australian films Red Hill (2010) and Boar (2017). He has revealed that he turned down a role in Baz Luhrmann's 1996 film Romeo + Juliet because he read the script and thought "this is going nowhere". In 2022 he appeared in Mystery Road:Origins.

In 2013, Bisley published his first book, Stillways: A Memoir. The book recounted his life growing up in Lake Munmorah, finishing when he was in his mid-teens. The book was well received and was subsequently shortlisted for the 2014 Douglas Stewart Prize for Non-Fiction in the NSW Premier's Literary Awards, the Queensland Literary Awards, and the 2014 National Biography Award. In 2017, Bisley published his second book, a memoir called All the Burning Bridges. Picking up where Stillways had left off, it covered his adult life.

He appeared as Bear O'Rourke in the 2024 TV mini-series Human Error. In 2026 he had a supporting role in the Amazon Prime comedy-drama Deadloch. For this, he won a Silver Logie for Best Actor in a Comedy.

== Personal life ==
Steve Bisley has been married once. Prior to his marriage, he had four children with long-time partner Shauna Forrest. During the 1980s Forrest was a costume designer for models and actresses.

He married Sally Burleigh, a media publicist, in 2000. They had two children before divorcing in 2006. In September 2009 Bisley was charged with assaulting Burleigh and, on 15 September 2010, he was found guilty and sentenced to 300 hours of community service. Bisley lodged an appeal against the conviction. In July 2013 while promoting his autobiography, Stillways: A Memoir, he described the assault as "a push and shove incident with high emotion displayed on both sides".

== Awards ==
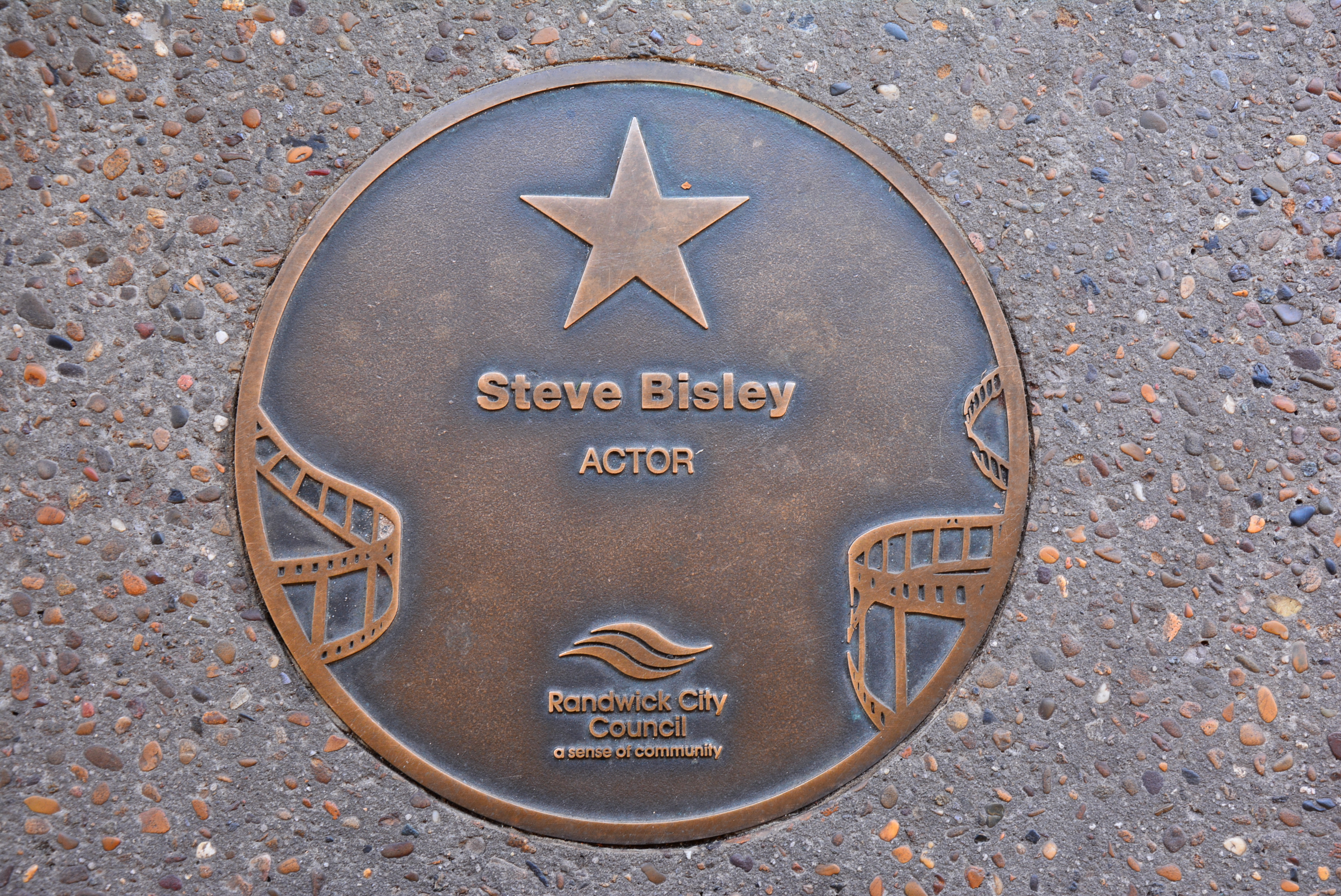
Bisley's plaque at the Australian Film Walk of Fame, Ritz Cinema, Randwick, Sydney

Year	Work	Award	Category	Result
1984	Fast Talking	AFI Awards	Best Actor in a Supporting Role	Nominated
1984	Silver City	AFI Awards	Best Actor in a Supporting Role	Won
1990	The Big Steal	AFI Awards	Best Actor in a Supporting Role	Won
1995	Halifax f.p.	AFI Awards	Best Performance by an Actor in a Television Drama	Nominated
2000	Water Rats	Logie Awards	Silver Logie for Most Outstanding Actor in a Series	Nominated
2001	Water Rats	Logie Awards	Silver Logie for Most Outstanding Actor in a Series	Nominated
2005	Hell Has Harbour Views	AFI Awards	Best Guest or Supporting Actor in Television	Nominated
2010	Steve Bisley	Australian Film Walk of Fame	In recognition of his film & television career	Honoured
2010	Steve Bisley	CinefestOZ	Screen Legend	Honoured
2013	Jack Irish: Bad Debts	Equity Ensemble Awards	Outstanding Performance by an Ensemble in a Miniseries or Telemovie	Nominated
2022	Mystery Road: Origin	AACTA Awards	Best Supporting Actor in a Drama	Nominated
2023	Mystery Road: Origin	Equity Ensemble Awards	Outstanding Performance by an Ensemble in a Drama Series	Won
2026	Deadloch	Logie Awards	Silver Logie for Most Outstanding Actor in a Comedy	Won

== Filmography ==
=== Film ===
Year	Title	Role	Notes
1977	Summer City	Boo	Feature film
1978	Newsfront	Iceman	Feature film
1979	Taxi	Terry Dean	TV movie
1979	The Last of the Knucklemen	Mad Dog	Feature film
1979	Mad Max	Jim 'Goose' Rains	Feature film
1980	The Chain Reaction	Larry Stilson	Feature film
1982	The Little Feller	Frank Blair	TV movie
1982	Squizzy Taylor	Snowy Cutmore	Film
1982	The Highest Honor	AB WG Falls	TV movie
1983	The Winds of Jarrah	Clem Mathieson	Film
1984	Silver City	Victor	Feature film
1984	Fast Talking	Redback	Feature film
1986	2 Friends	Kevin	TV movie
1988	Hard Knuckle	Harry	TV movie
1988	The Clean Machine	Inspector Eddie Riordan	TV movie
1990	The Big Steal	Gordon Farkas	Feature film
1992	Over the Hill	Benedict	Feature film
1994	Hell, Texas and Home		Short film
1995	Sanctuary	Robert 'Bob' King	Feature film
1999	In the Red	Sparky	Feature film
2004	Big Reef	Reilly	TV movie
2004	The Brush-Off	Eastlake	TV movie
2005	Hell Has Harbour Views	Bruce Kent	TV movie
2007	Shotgun	Tommy	Short film
2007	The King	Harry M. Miller	TV movie
2008	The View from Greenhaven	Lach	Feature film
2008	Actingclassof1977.com	Himself	Documentary film
2009	Subdivision	Harry	Film
2010	The Wedding Party	Roger	Feature film
2010	I Love You Too	Bill	Feature film
2010	Red Hill	William 'Old Bill' Jones	Feature film
2012	Jack Irish: Bad Debts	Kevin Pixley	TV movie
2013	The Great Gatsby	Dan Cody	Feature film
2017	Boar	Bob	
2020	The Stranger	John	Short film

=== Television ===
Year	Title	Role	Notes	Ref
1978–1984	Cop Shop	Rod / Bob	6 episodes	
1979	The Sullivans	Richard Granger	1 episode	
1980	The Last Outlaw	Joe Byrne	Miniseries, 4 episodes	
1980	Spring & Fall	Ray	1 episode	
1980	Lawson's Mates		1 episode	
1981	A Town Like Alice	Tim Whelan	Miniseries, 1 episode	
1981	The Patchwork Hero	Barnaby Jamieson	6 episodes	
1982	Jonah	Cook	4 episodes	
1984	A Country Practice	Jim Dawson	2 episodes	
1984	Special Squad	T-Bar	Episode 24: "Early Birds"	
1984	The Boy in the Bush	Esau	4 episodes	
1985	The Flying Doctors	Andy McGregor	3 episodes	
1986	Call Me Mister	Jack Bartholemew	10 episodes	
1986	Studio 86	Peter Faulkner	Episode: "Many Are Called by Francis Chalmers"	
1988	Emma: Queen of the South Seas	Tom Farrell	Miniseries, 2 episodes	
1990	EARTH Force	Wooster	1 episode	
1991	Eggshells	Lester		
1991	Boys from the Bush	Bill	1 episode	
1993	Seven Deadly Sins	Meadowvale Supervisor	Miniseries, episode: "Sloth"	
1994	Escape from Jupiter	Duffy	13 episodes	
1992–1995	Police Rescue	Snr Sgt Kevin Harris	29 episodes	
1995–1996	Halifax f.p.	Jonah Cole	2 episodes	
1995–1996	G.P.	Henry King	52 episodes	
1997	Frontline	Graeme Prowse	13 episodes	
1998–2001	Water Rats	Detective Sgt Jack Christy	97 episodes	
2004	Stingers	Donald	1 episode	
2006	Two Twisted	Frank	1 episode	
2007–2009	Sea Patrol	Commander Steve Marshall	25 episodes	
2008–2009	East of Everything	Terry Adams	11 episodes	
2010	Lowdown	Jack Copper	1 episode	
2013	Redfern Now	Richard	1 episode	
2014	Plonk	Ian Tyler	1 episode	
2016	Brock	Harry Firth	Miniseries, 2 episodes	
2016–2018	Doctor Doctor	Jim Knight	21 episodes	
2019	SeaChange	Gavin Taylor	1 episode	
2020	How to Stay Married	Stuart	1 episode	
2020	Grey Nomads	Ernie	6 episodes	
2022	Darby and Joan	Declan Kemp	Season 1, 1 episode	
2022	Mystery Road: Origin	Peter Lovric	6 episodes	
2024	Human Error	Bear O'Rourke	6 episodes	
2026	Deadloch	Frank McCallister	Season 2	

== Theatre ==
=== As actor ===
Year	Title	Role	Notes
1976	Le Chateau d'Hydro-Therapie Magnetique		Jane St Theatre, Sydney with NIDA Theatre
1976	As You Like It	Jaques / Charles / Silvius	NIDA Theatre, Sydney
1976	Miss Hook of Holland	Chorus	NIDA Theatre, Sydney
1977	Mother and Son	Jim Blake	NIDA Theatre, Sydney
1977	The Hostage	Pat	NIDA Theatre, Sydney, University of Newcastle, Orange Civic Theatre
1977	Once in a Lifetime	Weisskopf	NIDA Theatre, Sydney
1978	Richard III	Archbishop	Melbourne Athenaeum with MTC
1978	The Beaux' Stratagem	Hounslow	Melbourne Athenaeum with MTC
1979	The Caucasian Chalk Circle	Ironshirt	Sydney Opera House with NIDA & STC
1982	Hamlet on Ice	Horatio	Playhouse, Canberra with Theatre ACT
1984	The Blind Giant is Dancing	Allen Fitzgerald	Sydney Opera House with STC
1985	The Doll Trilogy: Kid Stakes / Other Times / Summer of the Seventeenth Doll	Barney Ibbot	Sydney Opera House, Melbourne Athenaeum with STC
1987	A Lie of the Mind		Belvoir St Theatre, Sydney
1988	Summer of the Seventeenth Doll / Away	Barney Ibbot	Pepsico Summerfare, New York with STC
1988; 1989	Don's Party		Sydney Opera House, Melbourne Athenaeum with Gary Penny Productions
1989	Speed-the-Plow	Bobby Gould	Sydney Opera House, Russell St Theatre, Melbourne with Gary Penny Productions
1991	The Selection	Skinny McGahn	Playhouse, Melbourne with MTC
1994	Dead Heart		Old Boans Warehouse, Perth, Eveleigh Railway Yards, Sydney with Black Swan Theatre Company & Belvoir
1995	Summer of the Seventeenth Doll	Barney Ibbot	Playhouse, Melbourne with MTC
2002	The Man from Snowy River: Arena Spectacular	Banjo Paterson	Australian tour
2002	A Man With Five Children	Gerry	Wharf Theatre, Sydney with STC
2003	Inheritance	Luke Delaney	Playhouse, Arts Centre Melbourne with MTC & Sydney Opera House with STC & MTC
2003	The Club	Laurie Holden	Sydney Opera House with STC
2004	Defending the Caveman		Illawarra Performing Arts Centre
2005	Love Letters	Andrew Makepeace III	NIDA Parade Theatre, Sydney
2007	The Glass Soldier	Older Wolfie / 'Pompey' Elliott	Playhouse, Melbourne with MTC
2009	The Removalists	Sergeant Simmonds	Wharf Theatre, Sydney with STC

=== As director ===
Year	Title	Role	Notes
1982	The Banana Bender	Director	Rex Hotel, Sydney with Studio Sydney
