= Growing Up Gracefully =

Growing Up Gracefully is a six-part Australian television comedy documentary series created, written and presented by sisters Hannah Reilly and Eliza Reilly and directed by Mike Nayna. It first screened on Wednesday 19 July 2017 at 9.30 p.m. on the ABC.

The show received attention after a sketch was published on the ABC TV Facebook page, garnering over 5 million views. This sketch was written about in media such as Bustle, Junkee, and BuzzFeed.

== Overview ==
Hannah and Eliza Reilly are two misguided twentysomethings, who after rediscovering the 1950s teen-advice book 'Growing Up Gracefully' and as young women in 2017, road-tested rules for women of that era versus the rules of today, with Hannah following the traditional advice and Eliza following modern advice.
