= Eternity Playhouse =

Coordinates: 33°52′43″S 151°12′58″E

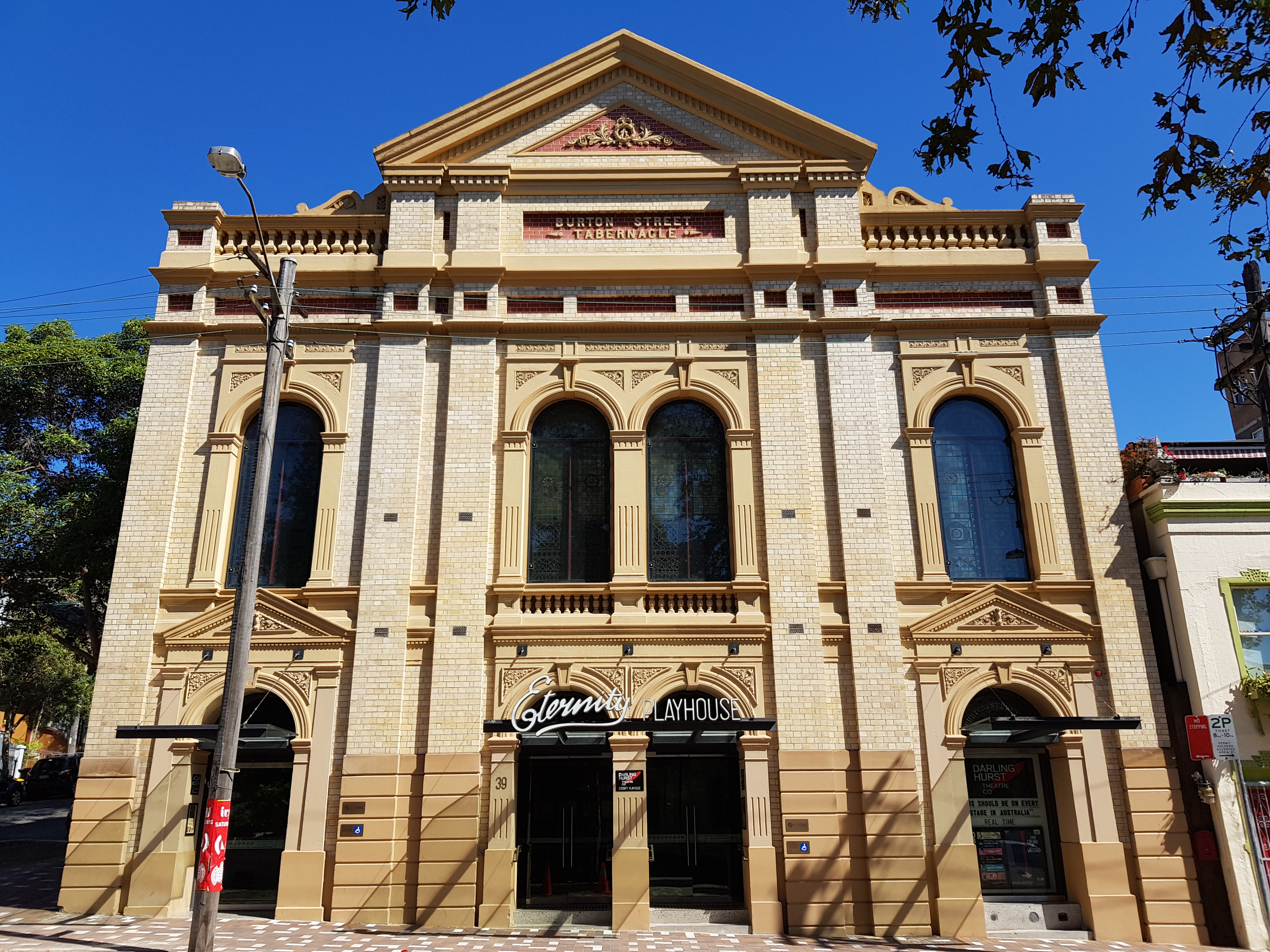
Eternity Playhouse, Darlinghurst

The Eternity Playhouse is a 200-seat theatre in Darlinghurst, Sydney. The playhouse, which opened in 2013, was created from the heritage-listed Burton Street Tabernacle. The name 'Eternity' references the work of Arthur Stace inscribing that word on Sydney streets. It is owned by the City of Sydney.

Darlinghurst Theatre Company was the resident company until it ceased operations in mid-2024 due to financial pressures.
