= Darkman (video game) =

1991 video game

Darkman: The Video Game
- Front box art (NES)
- Developers: Ocean Software; Painting by Numbers (NES)
- Publishers: Ocean Software, Hit Squad (Budget re-release)
- Series: Darkman
- Platforms: NES, Commodore 64, Amstrad CPC, Amiga, Game Boy, ZX Spectrum, Atari ST
- Release: NA: 1991; UK: 1991; NA: 1992; (Game Boy)
- Genre: Action
- Mode: Single-player

Darkman is a video game that was developed by Ocean Software (Painting By Numbers on the NES version, Twilight on the Commodore 64 and ZX Spectrum versions) and published by Ocean Software in 1991. It was released for the Amiga, ZX Spectrum, Amstrad CPC, Commodore 64 and Atari ST. Darkman had two different games of the same name, one for the Nintendo Entertainment System and the other for Game Boy. The game's plot is loosely based on the film of the same name.

== NES version ==
In this side-scrolling platformer, the player controls Darkman, a superhero who can jump, kick and punch, as well as swing from a rope during action sequences between levels. In most levels, Darkman's goal is to defeat the boss of the level before the time limit runs out. Tying into the plot of the film, Darkman can use masks to impersonate the various gangsters who are responsible for his disfigurement, but each disguise dissolves after being exposed to sunlight for too long. While in disguise, Darkman gains both a different appearance as well as the special ability of whoever he is impersonating.

Between levels, Darkman must photograph a different gangster before he can make a mask of them. These scenes involve moving the cursor to take a picture of the gangster. The better the photo accuracy, the more time Darkman is granted to complete the subsequent level. The final level is similar to the ending of the film, and takes place on a skyscraper under construction as Darkman fights for his life.

== Reception ==
Reception

Review scores
Publication	Score
Your Sinclair	85% (Spectrum); 22% (Spectrum re-release)
Crash	82% (Spectrum)
Sinclair User	78% (Spectrum)

The Spectrum version of the game was well received critically, with Crash magazine awarding 82%, and Sinclair User 78%. In a 1991 review, Your Sinclair gave the Spectrum version 85%, while a 1993 review by another Your Sinclair critic gave Darkman's budget re-release 22%.
