= Darkman =

1990 American film by Sam Raimi

- Theatrical release poster by John Alvin
- Directed by: Sam Raimi
- Screenplay by: Chuck Pfarrer; Sam Raimi; Ivan Raimi; Daniel Goldin; Joshua Goldin
- Story by: Sam Raimi
- Produced by: Robert Tapert
- Starring: Liam Neeson; Frances McDormand; Colin Friels; Larry Drake
- Cinematography: Bill Pope
- Edited by: Bud S. Smith; David Stiven
- Music by: Danny Elfman
- Production companies: Renaissance Pictures; Darkman Productions
- Distributed by: Universal Pictures
- Release date: August 24, 1990
- Running time: 96 minutes
- Country: United States
- Language: English
- Budget: $14 million
- Box office: $48.8 million

Darkman is a 1990 American superhero film directed and co-written by Sam Raimi. The film stars Liam Neeson as scientist Peyton Westlake, who is brutally attacked, disfigured, and left for dead by ruthless mobster Robert Durant (Larry Drake), after his girlfriend, attorney Julie Hastings (Frances McDormand), runs afoul of corrupt developer Louis Strack Jr. (Colin Friels). An experimental treatment gives Westlake super-human strength and resilience, with the unintended side-effect of rendering him mentally unstable and borderline psychotic. Consumed with vengeance, Westlake continues his research with the new goal of hunting down those who disfigured him.

After Raimi's initial desire to adapt The Shadow was turned down by Universal Studios, Raimi instead chose to create an original superhero based on a short story he wrote that paid homage to Universal's horror films of the 1930s. It was produced by Robert Tapert, and was written by Raimi, his brother Ivan, Chuck Pfarrer, and brothers Daniel and Joshua Goldin. Artist Tony Gardner designed and created the elaborate makeup effects required to turn Neeson into Darkman.

Neeson's first action film in the main role, Darkman received generally positive reviews by critics and was commercially successful, grossing $48 million, above its $14 million budget. This financial success spawned two direct-to-video sequels (without Neeson or Raimi) – The Return of Durant and Die Darkman Die – as well as adaptations including novels, comic books, and video games.

== Plot ==
Dr. Peyton Westlake is a scientist developing a prototype for a new "synthetic skin" to help burn-victims, but he cannot overcome a flaw that causes the skin to disintegrate after 99 minutes. His girlfriend Julie Hastings discovers an incriminating document called the "Bellasarious Memorandum" which proves that her boss, real estate developer Louis Strack Jr., has been bribing members of the zoning commission. When she confronts Strack, he confesses to the bribery because it aided in his plans for designing a new city and creating countless jobs. He warns her that the document could be sought after by high-ranking criminals for its value.

Westlake realizes that the synthetic skin is photosensitive and light causes the material to break down. However, vicious crime-boss Robert G. Durant and his armed thugs invade Westlake's lab searching for the Bellasarious Memorandum, which Julie had left behind. Westlake is tortured, while his lab-assistant Yakitito is murdered. Durant rigs the lab to explode and escapes with the document; Westlake is horrifyingly disfigured by the blast and thrown from the building.

As a John Doe, he is brought to a hospital and subjected to an experimental nerve procedure to eliminate the pain from his burns. However, as a side effect, his emotions are amplified, triggering an adrenal overload that gives him enhanced strength. Westlake awakens from a coma, escapes from the hospital, and discovers his plight. Realizing that Julie believes he's dead, he re-establishes his lab in an abandoned building, hoping to perfect his synthetic skin to fix his scarred face and body.

Overcome with anger at his circumstances, Westlake decides to seek revenge against Durant and his thugs. He finds and tortures Durant's associate Rick for information before murdering him. Westlake begins using his synthetic skin to create masks of Durant's associates while developing a talent for impressionism. He poses as the various criminals, creating distrust amongst one-another that leads them to killing one of their own, Pauly.

Westlake recreates his own face as a mask and goes to Julie. He convinces her that he was in a coma and keeps his disfigurement from her, making up excuses to leave before the synthetic skin breaks down. However, during a date at a carnival with Julie, he loses his temper and assaults a worker before fleeing. Julie follows him to the abandoned building and realizes that his face was only a mask. After tearfully confessing that she still loves him, she leaves.

While talking to Strack, Julie reveals that Westlake is still alive. She then discovers the Bellasarious Memorandum on his desk and realizes he was in league with Durant the entire time. When Julie leaves, Strack tells Durant to deal with her and Westlake. Durant kidnaps Julie and chases Westlake with his helicopter, trying to hit him with a special gun equipped with explosive bullets. Durant's cohorts storm Westlake's new laboratory. Westlake takes them out, blowing up his own lab to murder the final thug. Durant flees in the helicopter with Westlake dangling from an attached cable. After a long flight, Westlake attaches the cable to a semi-trailer, which pulls the helicopter into an explosive collision, seemingly killing Durant.

Impersonating Durant, Westlake meets up with Strack and a captive Julie at the top of an unfinished building. Strack sees through Westlake's ruse and pulls his mask off, revealing his disfigured face to Julie. A brawl breaks out, and though injured, Westlake gains the upper hand and drops Strack to his death. Julie tries to convince Westlake that he can return to his old life, but he refuses, changed by his quest for revenge and new vicious nature. He slips away from Julie, pulling on a mask and running into a crowd of pedestrians. As Julie searches for him, a disguised Westlake watches her for a moment before walking away. In his mind, he declares himself to be "Darkman".

== Cast ==
- Liam Neeson as Dr. Peyton Westlake / Darkman, a brilliant scientist working to develop synthetic skin. After being burned alive and left for dead, Westlake adopts the identity of Darkman to seek revenge on those who disfigured him.
  - Bruce Campbell portrays a disguised Darkman in the final scene of the film (credited as "Final Shemp"). Campbell additionally provided ADR for Darkman and other characters in post-production.
- Frances McDormand as Julie Hastings, an attorney and Westlake's love interest.
- Colin Friels as Louis Strack Jr., a corrupt and haughty billionaire developer set on completing an ambitious construction project (the "City of the Future") by any means possible.
- Larry Drake as Robert G. Durant, a ruthless and sadistic mob boss who works under the payroll of Strack.

Ted Raimi, Dan Hicks, (both returning from Evil Dead 2), Nicholas Worth, Dan Bell, and Rafael H. Robledo portray Rick Anderson, Skip Altwater, Pauly Mazzuchelli, Sam "Smiley" Rogers and Rudy Guzman respectively, members of Durant's gang. Jessie Lawrence Ferguson and Arsenio "Sonny" Trinidad play rival crime bosses Eddie Black and Hung Fat respectively. Nelson Mashita plays Yakitito, Westlake's lab assistant.

Additionally, Raimi's brother Ivan and director John Landis have cameos as hospital staff, with Jenny Agutter as the doctor treating Westlake's burns. Other appearances include Joel and Ethan Coen as the driver and passenger in an Oldsmobile, Professor Toru Tanaka and Nathan Jung as Hung Fat's Chinese Warriors, William Dear as the limo driver and Julius Harris as the gravedigger. Bridget Hoffman appears as the voice of Westlake's computer system.

== Production ==
=== Development and origins ===
Sam Raimi had long desired to make a movie about pulp hero The Shadow, but Universal Pictures (who had been developing their adaptation since the early 1980s) would not give him the rights to the character. Raimi then decided to create his own superhero, with the idea for "Darkman" developing from a short story he had written about a man who could change his face to become other people. As the short story evolved into a 40-page treatment, the focus expanded to become about a man who had lost his own face, exploring how he would use a newfound face-changing ability to battle criminals as well as how relationships from before his disfigurement would be affected. The story drew elements from other works — the scarred face and doomed love of The Phantom of the Opera, the tragedy of The Hunchback of Notre Dame, and pulp figures like The Shadow. Comparison was also drawn to Batman, with Darkman described as "a non-superpowered man who is a hideous thing who fights crime." Raimi was also inspired by the Universal horror films of the 1930s and 1940s because "they made me fear the hideous nature of the hero and at the same time drew me to him. I went back to that idea of the man who is noble and turns into a monster." Despite the grotesque appearance of the title character, Raimi did not consider Darkman to be a horror story: "it's more a tragedy than anything else. Sure, he looks terrible, he looks hideous [...] but really, what the movie turns out to be is the story of a man trying to recapture his lost love."

In 1987, Raimi submitted the treatment to Universal Pictures; the film was greenlit with a budget in the range of $8–12 million.

=== Pre-production ===
==== Writing ====
I decided to explore a man's soul. In the beginning, a sympathetic, sincere man. In the middle, a vengeful man committing heinous acts against his enemies. And in the end, a man full of self-hatred for what he's become, who must drift off into the night, into a world apart from everyone he knows and all the things he loves.

— Sam Raimi, quoted in "Darkman Brings Director's Talent to Light"

The process of developing the treatment into a screenplay was difficult. The Coen brothers helped Raimi with the initial structure of the script, though they never contributed a full draft. Raimi initially hired ex-Navy SEAL Chuck Pfarrer based on his work on Navy SEALs. Pfarrer's first draft was followed up by drafts cowritten by Raimi and his brother Ivan; Ivan, a doctor, was able to add authenticity to medical aspects and scientific elements of the story.

As Raimi and producing partner Robert Tapert progressed through various drafts, they realized they had a potential franchise on their hands. Universal brought in screenwriting brothers Daniel and Joshua Goldin to work on the script's fifth draft. According to Daniel, they were presented with various drafts and "lots of little story documents. There was just material everywhere; drafts seemed to go in many directions." Goldin focused on "pulling together a way of making the story work," with the brothers adding new lines of dialogue, new characters and bits of action. The Raimi brothers followed up with additional drafts, with the twelfth total draft becoming the shooting script that satisfied the studio.

Durant's finger collection developed over the Pfarrer and Raimi brothers' drafts. The director wanted a specific trademark for the character – one that hinted at a military background. Tapert later recalled Pfarrer was especially skilled at writing the script's villains.

==== Casting ====
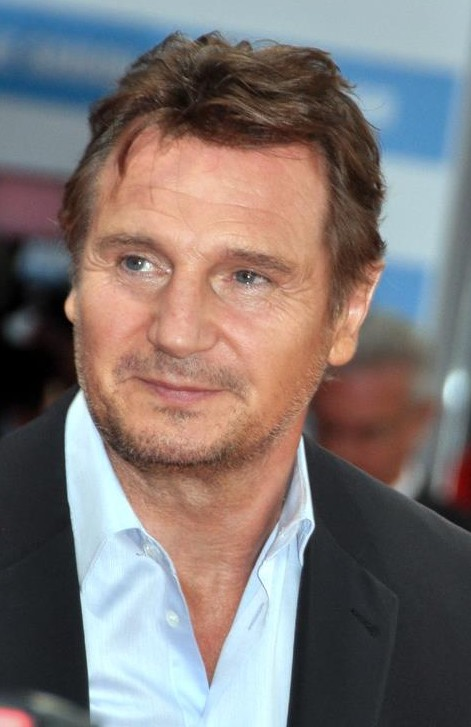
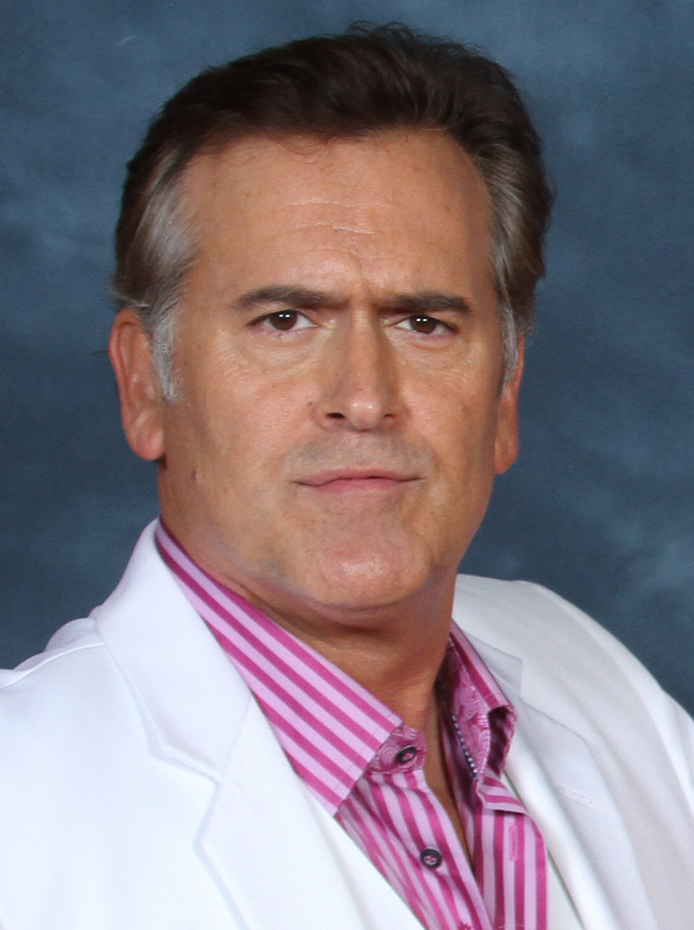
Liam Neeson (left) portrays the titular Dr. Peyton Westlake. Bruce Campbell (right), who had been director Sam Raimi's first choice for the role, portrays a disguised Darkman in a cameo appearance.

For the lead role of Darkman, Raimi was looking for someone who could suggest "a monster with the soul of a man," and could portray such emotional depth while wearing complex makeup. Initially, Raimi's longtime friend and collaborator Bruce Campbell was planned to play Darkman, but the studio did not consider him well known enough to carry the film. Actors including Bill Paxton and Gary Oldman were considered before Liam Neeson was cast; Raimi liked Neeson's "old Gary Cooper charisma", while casting director Nancy Nayor recalled his "haunted eyes." Neeson was drawn to the operatic nature of the story and the inner turmoil of the character. To research for the role, Neeson contacted the Phoenix Society for Burn Survivors, an organization that supports the emotional and social healing of burn survivors.

For Julie Hastings, Westlake's love interest, Universal had been pushing to cast Julia Roberts. Roberts and Neeson had briefly dated and broken up – after an emotional audition, Roberts' agent requested she be withdrawn from consideration. Demi Moore and Bridget Fonda were also considered. Frances McDormand eventually landed the part, beating out second-choice Kelly Lynch; McDormand, Joel Coen (her husband), Ethan Coen, and Sam Raimi were all living together at the time of the production, which had led to her getting the audition. McDormand candidly referred to the character as a "bimbo", describing her decision to take the role of the ingénue love interest as an attempt to break out of being typecast as a character actress due to her history of supporting roles in dramatic movies. McDormand and Neeson demonstrated strong chemistry in auditions and worked closely in rehearsals, rewriting the three love scenes they had together after Westlake becomes Darkman. They got through these scenes, according to the actress, by depending on "each other's knowledge, of theater and each other".

Larry Drake was cast as the villainous mob boss Robert G. Durant. Drake's approach to the character was to underplay his sinister nature, "quiet and careful, yet intense". Raimi remarked that Drake reminded him of Edward G. Robinson: "He looked so mean, so domineering, yet he had this urban wit about him. I thought, 'My God, this guy is not only threatening-looking, he has a good physical presence – what a perfect adversary for the Darkman!'" At the time, Drake was primarily known for his portrayal of the sympathetic character of Benny on L.A. Law, making his turn as a ruthless villain a dramatic departure.

=== Filming ===
Principal photography began on April 19, 1989, and wrapped on August 10, 1989; the film was shot on location in Los Angeles and Toronto, Ontario, and at Santa Clarita Studios in Santa Clarita, California.

Working with Universal meant a significant budgetary increase for Raimi – $14 million in final – allowing him to design and build a laboratory set for Darkman and afford helicopters and professional stuntmen to film the climactic helicopter chase through the city. Universal did not want Darkman to look too much like the Evil Dead films, a notion Raimi agreed with as he desired to portray the characters "as real human beings in extraordinary circumstances". Bill Pope was brought on as director of photography, by recommendation from Barry Sonnenfeld; Darkman was Pope's feature debut, and he would re-team with Raimi for Army of Darkness, Spider-Man 2, and Spider-Man 3. Visually, the filmmaker was interested in paying homage to Universal horror films of the 1930s. Production designer Randy Ser remarked, "if you look at Darkman's lab that he moves into, which is an old warehouse, what was on my mind was Dr. Frankenstein. There were a number of references visually to what we were thinking about in regards to those films."

The shooting was "exhausting" for Neeson, whose makeup took up to five hours to apply; he wore the ten-piece prosthetic makeup for up to 18 hours. Neeson was also preparing for a role as a boxer in The Big Man, and would awake as early as 3 AM to train for his subsequent role before beginning the day's work on Darkman. He saw the lengthy time spent in extensive makeup as a challenge and liked "the idea of working behind a mask on camera, and just exploring the possibilities of what that entailed". He and makeup effects designer Tony Gardner did tests using specific glues, foams, and bandage coverings. They also timed how fast they could apply the prosthetic makeup and put the costume on. Neeson worked with the costume designer on his outfit, including aspects like the cloak. The hardest part for the actor was speaking with false teeth and he ended up doing "a lot of work on my voice – I didn't want the [false teeth] to move at all."

Raimi and McDormand had difficulties working together. McDormand, who at the time had primarily worked in theater, struggled with transitioning to movies and finding the ideal way to portray her character; Raimi reflected that their disagreements were "healthy" even as their conception of the picture differed.

=== Post-production ===
Universal came into conflict with Raimi and Tapert during the arduous post-production of the film, which saw extensive editing and poor preview scores.

Initial cuts of the movie by editor David Stiven performed poorly, with the editor eventually suffering a nervous breakdown and leaving the film. Early preview screenings did not go well as audiences laughed in the wrong places and complained about a lack of a happy ending. Universal executives described the film as one of the worst-scoring pictures in the studio's history, with some preview viewers rating Darkman as the worst film they had ever seen. Editor Bud S. Smith was brought in by the studio to salvage the film, working solo for three weeks without input from Raimi or Tapert. Smith cut Darkman down from two hours to 85 minutes, working to improve the flow of the film and cut some of the more outrageous moments, yet preview scores continued to drop. Tapert recalls disappointment with the studio's reluctance to include many of the "wild things" Raimi had filmed.

The studio finally approved an edit of Smith's. Dispirited but still believing a much better cut could still be made, Tapert and editor Bob Murawski (who would go on to edit many of Raimi's subsequent films) reedited the entire movie in a process that included adding back approximately nine minutes of previously cut footage. This edit—created without the input or approval of either Raimi or Universal—was then delivered as the final picture. Studio executives were outraged by the deception, but as the negative had been cut and sound had been mixed the renegade edit proceeded as scheduled to critic reviews and the final release.

== Music ==
Darkman: Original Motion Picture Soundtrack

Soundtrack album by Danny Elfman
- Released: August 17, 1990
- Recorded: 1990
- Genre: Film score
- Length: 40:09
- Label: MCA
- Producer: Danny Elfman

Danny Elfman chronology
Dick Tracy (1990)	Darkman: Original Motion Picture Soundtrack (1990)	Batman Returns (1992)

Professional ratings
Review scores
Source	Rating
AllMusic	3/5 stars

Released by MCA Records on August 17, 1990, the soundtrack to Darkman was composed by Danny Elfman, who previously scored the music to Tim Burton's Batman in 1989. In 2017, Waxwork Records released the soundtrack on vinyl which was remastered from the original tapes. La-La Land Records released an expanded soundtrack album in January 2020, featuring over 30 minutes of previously unreleased music.

Elfman said of his score: "Again old-fashioned and melodramatic, but in a way that I'm crazy about. Sam Raimi has a wonderful visual style that lends itself easily to music. It was an enormous relief writing long, extended musical sequences, something which is very rare in modern films. No reason to hold back on this one."

All tracks are written by Danny Elfman.

1990 soundtrack
No.	Title	Length
1.	"Main Titles"	1:37
2.	"Woe, the Darkman... Woe"	6:09
3.	"Rebuilding / Failure"	3:16
4.	"Love Theme"	0:56
5.	"Julie Transforms"	1:11
6.	"Rage / Peppy Science"	1:37
7.	"Creating Pauley"	3:19
8.	"Double Durante"	1:50
9.	"The Plot Unfolds (Dancing Freak)"	7:01
10.	"Carnival from Hell"	3:16
11.	"Julie Discovers Darkman"	1:59
12.	"High Steel"	4:19
13.	"Finale / End Credits"
14.	Untitled	3:39
Total length:		40:09

2020 soundtrack Disc 2: Expanded Presentation
No.	Title	Length
1.	"Intro / Three Fingers"	2:56
2.	"Snip, Snip, Snip"	1:42
3.	"Main Titles"	1:41
4.	"Peppy Science" (Film Version)	1:19
5.	"Persistence / Marry Me"	0:42
6.	"Love Theme"	1:00
7.	"The Model"	1:41
8.	"One Hundred Minutes / Peyton Gets Tromped"	2:17
9.	"Yakitito / The Big Bang"	2:47
10.	"Julie Transforms"	1:17
11.	"Hospital"	0:39
12.	"Rage"	0:29
13.	"Woe, the Darkman... Woe" (Film Version)	6:17
14.	"Rebuilding / Failure" (Film Version)	3:24
15.	"Waltz / Rage / First Blood"	2:19
16.	"Creating Pauley"	3:25
17.	"The Plot Unfolds (Dancing Freak)" (Film Version)	6:25
18.	"Finger Stinger"	1:48
19.	"False Durant"	1:13
20.	"Durant Stinger / Durant in Trouble"	2:02
21.	"Double Durant" (Film Version)	1:54
22.	"Carnival from Hell" (Extended Version)	4:06
23.	"Julie Discovers Darkman"	2:03
24.	"Julie Stinger / City Stinger"	0:59
25.	"Peyton on the Run"	2:09
26.	"Darkman Stalks / Guzman's Reveal"	2:19
27.	"Chopper Spree"	1:18
28.	"Shake Him"	2:21
29.	"Durant Bites It / Dead, Not Dead?"	1:44
30.	"High Steel" (Extended Version)	5:57
31.	"Finale / End Credits"	3:45
32.	"Yakitito / The Big Bang" (Alternate)	2:52

== Release ==
=== Marketing ===
Ads asking "Who is Darkman?" began appearing on bus benches, public transit, and television as early as June 1990. Universal VP of Media Vic Fondrk said that the studio did not want to spend much money promoting the film in advance, "but we wanted to create some intrigue for the Darkman character". Raimi was fond of the "brilliant" marketing campaign, remarking "the marketing made the film a money-maker".

=== Box office ===
On its opening weekend, Darkman grossed a total of $8 million in 1,786 theaters, placing first at the box office. To date, the film has grossed a total of $48.8 million worldwide.

== Reception ==
On Rotten Tomatoes, the film has an approval rating of 80% based on reviews from 161 critics. The site's consensus states: "Gruesome and deliciously broad, Sam Raimi's Darkman bears the haunted soulfulness of gothic tragedy while packing the stylistic verve of onomatopoeia springing off a comic strip page." On Metacritic the film has a score of 65 based on reviews from 15 critics, indicating "generally favorable" reviews. Audiences polled by CinemaScore gave the film an average grade of "C+" on an A+ to F scale.

Los Angeles Times film critic Michael Wilmington felt that Darkman was the only film at the time "that successfully captures the graphic look, rhythm and style of the superhero books". Terrence Rafferty of The New Yorker said, "Raimi works from inside the cheerfully violent adolescent-male sensibility of superhero comics, as if there were no higher style for a filmmaker to aspire to, and the absence of condescension is refreshing." Peter Travers of Rolling Stone wrote: "Raimi's live-action comic book aims to deliver scares spiked with laughs. That it does." USA Today gave the film three out of four stars, and wrote: "With good leads and a few bucks, he's come up with a high-octane revenge piece mentionable in the same breath as its predecessors." Richard Corliss in Time said "Raimi isn't effective with his actors, and the dialogue lacks smart menace, but his canny visual sense carries many a scene." Entertainment Weekly gave the film a "B" rating and Owen Gleiberman wrote: "The movie is full of jaunty, Grand Guignol touches (the main gangster enjoys snapping and collecting fingers), but Raimi's images also have a spectral, kinetic beauty." In his review for The Washington Post, Joe Brown wrote: "Though Raimi seems to be trying to restrain himself, his giddily sick sense of humor still pops out all over the place – Darkman is a frenetic funhouse ride that has you laughing and screaming at the same time." Rita Kempley also of The Washington Post called it "a fiendishly stylish journey that links the classics of transfiguration to the terrors of our times". On the TV program At the Movies, Gene Siskel and Roger Ebert gave the film "two thumbs up". Both remarked at how original and stylised Raimi's sense of direction was, with Siskel adding that Darkman as a character was "interesting".

Ian Nathan of Empire magazine said the film was "certainly not Raimi at his best, but some knowing genre nods and an array of great effects make up much of the deficit". People's Ralph Novak called Darkman, a "loud, sadistic, stupidly written, wretchedly acted film".

Darkman was singled out for notice by comic-book writer Peter David in the Comics Buyer's Guide as "The Perfect Super-Hero Film of All Time", although this assessment was based upon other features of the film than general quality. The A.V. Club called Darkman a key transitional film, bridging from Burton's Batman films, while forging its own dark path to the future.

The film was nominated for five Saturn Awards: Best Horror Film, Best Director, Best Actor, Best Supporting Actor, and Best Makeup.

== Other media ==
Tony Gardner's company Alterian, Inc. produced two different Halloween masks of the Darkman character after the film was released. Merchandising for the character all but disappeared for close to a decade until SOTA Toys obtained the rights to make a Darkman action figure. SOTA president Jerry Macaluso explained that Universal had been confused about the merchandise rights:

Universal didn't know they owned the merchandise rights [to Darkman]. It didn't show up on any of their merchandise sheets. I had to convince them to spend a little time and have their lawyers look into it. I knew at the time that film was made Sam (Raimi) didn't have the power to retain those rights so it HAD to be Universal even though they said they didn't have them. Turns out I was right and afterwards Darkman started to show up in all their catalogs of films available to license...

In 2005, SOTA produced two versions of their Darkman action figure (including interchangeable head and hands to allow the figure to be either bandaged or revealing his scarred visage), as well as a Darkman statue.

In November 2007, Sideshow Collectibles put up for pre-order a 1:4 scale "Premium" Format Figure version of Darkman that would be released in 3rd quarter 2008.

=== Comic books ===
Coinciding with the movie's release in 1990, Marvel Comics published a three-issue adaptation of Darkman in color, along with a larger black-and-white magazine-size adaptation consisting of all three issues. In 1993, Marvel published a follow-up six-issue mini-series that served as a sequel to the film.

In 2006, Dynamite Entertainment published crossover series Darkman vs. Army of Darkness, which saw Darkman joining forces with Ash Williams from Army of Darkness. The four-issue miniseries was co-written by Kurt Busiek, who had penned the 1993 Darkman comic series.

=== Novels ===
Alongside the theatrical release in 1990, Jove Books published the novel adaptation written by Randall Boyll. In 1994, Boyll returned to expand upon the adventures of Darkman in four novels published by Pocket Books. Over the course of the booksThe Hangman, The Price of Fear, The Gods of Hell, and In the Face of Death, Boyll develops Darkman's character and how he deals with his new existence as an outcast with the ability to help others.

=== Video game ===
Ocean Software developed a video game adaptation of Darkman, released in 1991, for the NES and multiple other 8-bit and 16-bit home computers.

=== Television ===
Universal Television financed a 30-minute television pilot presentation based on Darkman, which was made in 1992 and was to be shown on Fox. The pilot, directed by Brian Grant, featured an altered retelling of the character's origin and introduced several new characters. Larry Drake reprised his role of Robert G. Durant, while Christopher Bowen took over the role of Peyton Westlake/Darkman and Kathleen York played policewoman Jenny.

The origin is similar to the original film as Peyton discovers his synthetic skin, is attacked and left for dead by Durant and his gang. In this version, however, Peyton is already married to Julie, and she is killed in the explosion. As in the films, Westlake becomes Darkman, and seeks vengeance on Durant and his gang. Darkman's headquarters are in an abandoned observatory overlooking the city, and he is wanted by the police for his actions against Durant's gang. The pilot ends with some scenes from the first film (particularly of Darkman and Durant fighting) and Darkman stating that justice will answer with a brand new face. The pilot went unaired and never got picked up.

=== Sequels ===
Two direct-to-video sequels were produced: Darkman II: The Return of Durant (1995) and Darkman III: Die Darkman Die (1996). Though Drake reprised his role as Durant in the second film, Arnold Vosloo took over the role of Darkman from Neeson. Raimi stepped back to an executive producer role; both sequels were instead directed by Bradford May.

In an April 2022 interview, Neeson was asked if he would be interested in a hypothetical Darkman sequel; he indicated that he would at least be willing to read the script. That May, Raimi shared that Universal was considering a Darkman sequel and that a producer was attached to the project, but confessed his work on Doctor Strange in the Multiverse of Madness was keeping him too busy to learn any more. No official announcement had been made by the studio at the time. In January 2026, Raimi said that his production company, Ghost House Pictures, was trying to make the film, already having a screenplay written and Brian Netto and Adam Schindler set to direct, but was having difficulty with the financing.

== Home media ==
The movie was initially released on VHS and Laserdisc by MCA/Universal Home Video in 1991.

In 1998, Darkman was released on DVD. Bonus material included production notes, cast and crew biographies, and a trailer. All three Darkman films were released in a box set by Universal Studios in August 2007. Each is presented in 1.85:1 anamorphic widescreen, along with an English Dolby Digital 5.1 Surround track.

The high definition version of Darkman was first released on HD DVD on July 31, 2007, followed by a Blu-ray edition on June 16, 2010. Shout! Factory released a "Collector's Edition" Blu-ray on February 18, 2014. Shout released a 4K Blu-Ray of their collector's edition February 20, 2024.
