= The Phoenix Society =

The Phoenix Society (or Phoenix Society) may refer to:

- Phoenix Society (firefighters), a fraternal organization of black firefighters
- Phoenix Society of the Hellfire Club, a dining society derived from the Hellfire Club
- Phoenix Society for Burn Survivors, a support organization for burn victims and their allies
- Phoenix Society (now Bedford Industries), a workplace in Adelaide, Australia for people with disabilities
- Phoenix Society, a campus debate club of Wells College, Aurora, New York, of which Frances Cleveland was a member
