= Dr. Giggles =

1992 film by Manny Coto

- Theatrical release poster
- Directed by: Manny Coto
- Written by: Manny Coto; Graeme Whifler
- Produced by: Stuart M. Besser
- Starring: Larry Drake; Holly Marie Combs
- Cinematography: Robert Draper
- Edited by: Debra Neil-Fisher
- Music by: Brian May
- Production companies: Largo Entertainment; JVC Entertainment; Dark Horse Entertainment
- Distributed by: Universal Pictures
- Release date: October 23, 1992
- Running time: 93 minutes
- Country: United States
- Language: English
- Budget: $7 million
- Box office: $8.4 million

Dr. Giggles is a 1992 American slasher film directed by Manny Coto, starring Larry Drake as Evan Rendell Jr., the eponymous Dr. Giggles, and Holly Marie Combs as Jennifer Campbell. The film co-stars Cliff DeYoung and Glenn Quinn. It is based on the comic book series of the same name published by Dark Horse Comics. It was released by Universal Pictures on October 23, 1992.

== Plot ==
In the town of Moorehigh in 1957, the patients of Dr. Evan Rendell keep disappearing. The townspeople find out that Rendell and his son (Evan Jr.) have been ripping out the patients' hearts in an attempt to resurrect the doctor's dead wife. The townspeople, in an uproar, take matters into their own hands by dragging Dr. Rendell out of his house and stoning him to death in the town streets. The townspeople also search for Evan Jr., but he has inexplicably disappeared.

In 1992 (thirty-five years later), the adult Evan Jr. (now nicknamed "Dr. Giggles" for his giggle and obsession to follow in his father's footsteps) escapes from a mental asylum, killing everyone in his path. In Moorehigh, 19-year-old Jennifer Campbell, her boyfriend Max Anderson, and their friends are planning their summer break. Jennifer, already upset by family trouble, is further distressed from having a heart condition and being forced to wear a heart monitor. Dr. Giggles returns to his childhood home, goes through Evan Sr.'s files, and gathers a list of names. He begins stalking and killing several residents, including Jennifer's friends.

After a party, Jennifer becomes fed up with her heart monitor and dumps it in a fish tank. Jennifer's father finds it and leaves to look for her. Dr. Giggles shows up and kills his wife(Jennifer's prospective stepmother). Jennifer returns to the party and sees Max kissing another girl. Distraught, she runs into the house of mirrors. Dr. Giggles notices Jennifer has the same heart condition as his mother and goes after her. He kills the girl Max was kissing, but Jennifer sees him coming and escapes. Officers Magruder and Reitz find her and take her to the police station.

Officer Magruder explains to Reitz how Evan Jr. escaped. He was on guard duty at the morgue, housing the bodies of Dr. Rendell and his wife. Investigating a giggle, he witnessed Evan Jr. cutting his way out of his mother's body with a scalpel. He realized that Rendell had cut open his wife's body, stuffed his son in and sewn it shut. Upon being threatened by Evan Jr., Magruder passed out from shock. When he woke up, Rendell's wife's corpse had been re-sewn, and all traces of the event at the morgue had been wiped clean.

Dr. Giggles makes his way to Jennifer's house and attacks her father. Officer Magruder goes to investigate Jennifer's house and finds her father there, lying in a pool of blood. Dr. Giggles mortally wounds Magruder who, recognizing Evan Jr., shoots and wounds him before dying. Reitz arrives soon after, finding his partner dead and Jennifer's father wounded but alive.

Meanwhile, Dr. Giggles returns to his hideout, performing surgery on himself to remove the bullet. He kidnaps Jennifer and tells her his plan to replace her "broken" heart with one he took from her friends. Reitz and Max arrive. While Reitz distracts Dr. Giggles, Max and Jennifer escape. Dr. Giggles kills Reitz, but his father's house explodes and collapses on him.

At the hospital, Jennifer learns that the events of the evening have damaged her heart, requiring immediate surgery. While she is being prepped, Dr. Giggles reappears and cuts a bloody path through the hospital staff. He chases her to a janitor's closet. Jennifer ambushes and finally kills Dr. Giggles with his own instruments. Dr. Giggles breaks the fourth wall, staring at the camera and weakly asking, "Is... there a... doctor in the house?" before he collapses and dies.

Recovering in the hospital, Jennifer is visited by Max and her father.

== Cast ==
- Holly Marie Combs as Jennifer Campbell
- Larry Drake as Dr. Evan Rendell Jr. / Dr. Giggles
- Cliff DeYoung as Tom Campbell
- Glenn Quinn as Max Anderson
- Keith Diamond as Officer Joe Reitz
- Richard Bradford as Officer Hank Magruder
- Michelle Johnson as Tamara
- John Vickery as Dr. Chamberlain
- Nancy Fish as Elaine Henderson
- Doug E. Doug as Trotter
- William Dennis Hunt as Dr. Evan Rendell Sr.

== Production ==
On 11 August 1992, the Daily Variety reported that Largo Entertainment signed an exclusive first-look deal with Dark Horse Comics to develop and produce films based on Dark Horse's franchises. Dr. Giggles was the first film produced as part of this venture.

Graeme Whifler's initial script, known under the title Mr. Giggles, was considerably different from the final film. According to Whifler, due to the producers strong desire for a horror franchise, numerous changes were made on the script, all of which Whifler felt resulted in an inferior film. Whifler would later revisit the original script for Mr. Giggles and adapt it himself as writer and director for the 2005 film, Neighborhood Watch. Once Manny Coto was hired as director, he also rewrote the original script at the request of Largo Entertainment, adding in comedic elements of a family doctor based on his experience with his father and brother who are both doctors. Coto stated his intention was to get a balance of both dark humor and horror similar to Tales from the Crypt. Larry Drake was hesitant to take on the role of the titular slasher as he'd done four other horror roles since coming to prominence on L.A. Law and didn't want to be typecast. Coto managed to convince Drake that the film would be more similar tonally to a comic book film and emphasized the humorous aspects of the script, which were a major selling point in getting Drake to sign on. Stuart M. Besser was hired to produce the film due to his success with The People Under the Stairs.

Bad Company singer Paul Rodgers covered the song "Bad Case of Lovin' You" for the soundtrack.

== Release ==
The film was theatrically released on October 23, 1992. A home video release followed on April 28, 1993 for VHS, and May 5, 1993 for LaserDisc, with the latter receiving releases in both fullscreen and widescreen. Since then, the film is now owned by Library Rights Company (UK), Ltd. and Zelus Film Holding Company, LLC, licensing the film to various distributors for subsequent releases. In the 2001 the film was released on DVD by GoodTimes Entertainment, and would later be reprinted on September 25, 2007 by Warner Home Video, as part of their Twisted Terror Collection. Warner Home Video would also release Dr. Giggles on Blu-Ray on July 6, 2010 but only as part of a dual pack alongside the 2008 film Otis, and displaying the film on an open matte 1.78:1 aspect ratio instead of the original theatrical release's 2.35:1. The film would later be released individually on Blu-Ray by Shout Factory on March 21, 2023, this time retaining the proper aspect ratio as well as including a few extra features.

Dr Giggles was the first film distributed by Universal Pictures through its distribution deal with Largo. Universal would handle domestic distribution and release the film in all territories except for Japan and Italy, where the film would be released by the Victor Co. of Japan Ltd. and Penta Films respectively. The film premiered in Los Angeles and New York on 23 October 1992.

The original release was on October 23, 1992 and the re-release on December 12, 2009 at New Beverly Cinema in Los Angeles. Following writing and directing Dr. Giggles, Coto created some more original stories about the character for a then-upcoming comic-book series from Dark Horse.

=== Critical response ===
On review aggregator Rotten Tomatoes, Dr. Giggles holds an approval rating of 23% based on 31 reviews and an average rating of 3.7/10. Its consensus reads, "Larry Drake's deranged performance as the titular doctor is just about all that distinguishes Dr. Giggles from its slasher brethren." Audiences polled by CinemaScore gave the film an average grade of "C+" on an A+ to F scale.

Variety called it a "wildly uneven horror film" and said that the film focuses too much on cheap laughs. Vincent Canby also criticized the script in his review for The New York Times, stating, "The screenplay is stitched together from variations on cliches used by or about the medical community." The Washington Post wrote, "Manny Coto turns to co-writer Graeme Whifler time and again for punchlines in a desperate attempt to revive a script that begins in critical condition and ends up DOA." Sight & Sound wrote that the film's satire "gives way to a few nicely nasty moments" but that the film never tops the visual flair of the opening credits.
