= Miranda Downes =

Australian screenwriter (1950–1985)

Miranda Downes (27 February 1950 – 3 August 1985) was an Australian screenwriter. Ernest Arthur Knibb was convicted of her murder.

Miranda (known as Mandy) attended Cumberland High School in New South Wales. She was awarded a Bachelor of Arts from the University of New South Wales. Subsequently, she completed a course in "script writing" at the National Institute of Dramatic Art (NIDA).

She worked as a production secretary in the film industry when she wrote an original script, Undercover (1983). She later started working on a script called Cane about Italian cane cutters in Queensland, when she was murdered on a beach north of Cairns. Ernest Knibb was arrested after an investigation by the TV show 60 Minutes.

Cane became the mini series Fields of Fire.

== Select credits ==
- Undercover (1983)
- First Love - "The House That Jack Built"
- The Last Resort (1988)
- Fields of Fire
