= Anne-Louise Lambert =

Australian actress (born 1955)

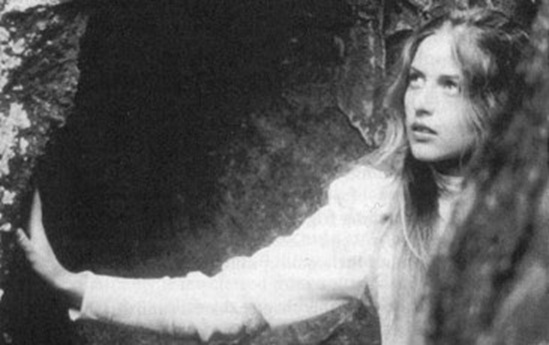
- Lambert in Picnic at Hanging Rock (1975)
- Born: Anne Louise Lambert; 1956 (age 69–70); Brisbane, Australia
- Other names: Anne Lambert
- Occupations: Actress, psychotherapist, counsellor, coach
- Years active: 1972–present
- Notable work: Picnic at Hanging Rock (1975)
- Children: 1

Anne-Louise Lambert (born 1956), also credited as Anne Lambert, is an Australian actress. She is best known for her role as Miranda in the 1975 film Picnic at Hanging Rock.

== Early life ==
Anne Louise Lambert was born in Brisbane, Australia in 1956; she later moved to Sydney. She grew up alongside two younger brothers, Tony and Andrew, and younger sister, screenwriter Sarah Lambert. When their parents split up in the mid-1970s, Lambert moved to the inner-Sydney suburb of Balmain with her mother and siblings.

== Career ==
Under the name Anne Lambert, she first gained recognition on Australian television with roles in three soap operas. In 1973, she played nymphomaniac Sue Marshall in Number 96. The following year, she was an original cast member in a school-based drama, Class of '74, playing student Peggy Richardson.

Director Peter Weir saw Lambert in a television commercial for Fanta playing the fancy Nancy character and felt she was perfect for the lead role as the ethereal Miranda St Clare in Picnic at Hanging Rock. She was nominated for Best Actress in a Supporting Role at the 1976 Australian Film Institute Award for her role in the film.

During 1975, Lambert appeared in a recurring sketch in comedy series The Norman Gunston Show called "The Checkout Chicks". This sketch, a send-up of melodramatic soap operas set in a supermarket, mostly featured other former Number 96 actors – Vivienne Garrett, Candy Raymond, Philippa Baker, Judy Lynne, and Abigail. In 1976, she had a six-month role in adult soap opera The Box as the "sexy and promiscuous" Trish Freeman.

Lambert moved to the UK for work at the age of 21. She adopted the name Anne-Louise Lambert when she realised that another actress was listed as Anne Lambert. She has worked steadily ever since, including roles in the BBC TV series The Borgias (1981), Cousin Phillis (1982) and Peter Greenaway's The Draughtsman's Contract (1982). She played the role of Lady Mary Brackenstall in the adaptation of The Abbey Grange for The Adventures of Sherlock Holmes (1986). She also appeared in Australian TV miniseries such as Mussolini and I (1985), Great Expectations: The Untold Story (1987) and The Dirtwater Dynasty (1988), Fields of Fire 2 (1988) and Tanamera – Lion of Singapore (1989).

Lambert's film credits include A Los Cuatro Vientos (1987), Breathing Under Water (1991) and Seeing Red (1992), Lilian's Story alongside Toni Collette (1996) and Somersault, which won Best Film at the 2004 Australian Film Institute Awards. She also appeared in the 2004 Australian TV series The Alice, the 2006 short drama Photograph (directed by her sister Sarah Lambert), and 2011 short film Waiting for the Turning of the Earth. Her most recent movie is The Last Babushka Doll (2018).

Lambert's stage roles include Sweet Bird of Youth, co-starring with Lauren Bacall and Colin Friels.

== Personal life ==
Lambert resides in the Sydney suburb of Balmain with her son (born in 1989) and works as a psychotherapist, counsellor, and coach.

== Filmography ==
=== Films ===
Year	Tiitle	Role	Type
1975	Picnic at Hanging Rock	Miranda St Clare	Feature film
1982	The Draughtsman's Contract	Mrs. Talmann / Mrs. Herbert's daughter	Feature film (UK)
1982	Gossip	Clare	Feature film (UK) (unfinished)
1987	A los cuatro vientos	Georgina	Feature film (Spain)
1991	Breathing Under Water	Beatrice	Feature film
1992	Seeing Red	Amanda	Feature film
1993	Just Desserts	Mona	Film short
1994	Unacceptable Behaviour	Lisa	Film short
1995	Napoleon	Spider / Earless Wallaby / Desert Mouse (voice)	Feature film
1996	Lilian's Story	Mother	Feature film
1997	A Cut in the Rates		Film short
2004	Somersault	Martha	Feature film
2006	Photograph	Mandy	Film short
2007	You or Me	Annie	Film short
2008	A Chair with a View	Narrator (voice)	Film short
2011	Waiting for the Turn of the Earth	Sarah	Film short
2016	Target Fascination	Patricia Nowlan	Feature film
2018	The Last Babushka Doll		Film short
2022	Mother Mountain	Linda	Feature film

=== Television ===
Year	Title	Role	Type
1973	Number 96	Sue Marshall	7 episodes
1974–1975	Class of '74	Peggy 'The Iceberg' Richardson	
1975	Class of '75	Peggy Richardson	
1975	Behind the Legend		1 episode
1975	Matlock Police	Ellen Prosser	1 episode
1975	Division 4	Julie Sullivan	1 episode
1975	The Norman Gunston Show	Herself in 'The Checkout Chicks' sketch	6 episodes
1976	The Box	Trish Freeman	
1976	Up The Convicts		1 episode
1976	Murcheson Creek		TV movie
1978	Glenview High	Susan	1 episode
1978	Chopper Squad	Marilyn	1 episode
1978	Against the Wind	Miss Stodart	Miniseries, 1 episode
1979	Cop Shop	Jenny McGregor	19 episodes
1981	The Borgias	Lucrezia Borgia	Miniseries, 9 episodes (UK)
1982	Jackanory Playhouse	Princess Gilda	1 episode (UK)
1982	Cousin Phillis	Phillis Holman	4 episodes (UK)
1982	The Year of the French	Ellen Treacy	Miniseries, 3 episodes (France/Ireland)
1983	Jury	Margaret	1 episode (UK)
1985	Mussolini: The Untold Story	Orsola	3 episodes (US/Yugoslavia)
1986	The Return of Sherlock Holmes	Lady Mary Brackenstall	1 episode (UK)
1987	Great Expectations: The Untold Story	Estella	TV movie
1988	The Dirtwater Dynasty	Emma Tarbox / Emma Tarbox Sr	Miniseries, 5 episodes
1988	Fields of Fire II	Kate	Miniseries, 2 episodes
1989	Tanamera – Lion of Singapore	Irene	Miniseries, 7 episodes
1989	Living with the Law		
1991	Heroes II: The Return	Nancy Davidson	Miniseries, 2 episodes
1994	Under the Skin		1 episode: "Grandmother's Teeth"
1997	Big Sky	Jean Friedrich	1 episode
1998	Murder Call	Linda Hindwood	1 episode
1998	Children's Hospital	Marion Laing	1 episode
2001	Changi	Mary	Miniseries, 1 episode
2002	All Saints	Gabrielle Trebom	1 episode
2003	White Collar Blue	Valerie Dunn	1 episode
2004	The Alice	Heaven Daily	TV movie
2005	The Alice	Heaven	1 episode
2015	House of Hancock	Hope Hancock (as Anne Louise Lambert)	Miniseries, 1 episode
2017	House of Bond	Josie Rowland	Miniseries, 2 episodes

== Theatre ==
Year	Title	Role	Type
1975	The Miser		UNSW Old Tote Theatre
1983	The Rivals	Lydia Languish	National Theatre, London
1988	The King and I	Princess Tuptim	Arts Theatre, Adelaide with Metropolitan Musical Theatre Company
1991	Three Stories High - Julia's Song / Painted Woman / Koori Love		Belvoir Street Theatre, Sydney
1993	Money and Friends		Playhouse, Newcastle, University of Newcastle with Hunter Valley Theatre Company
1986	Sweet Bird of Youth	Heavenly Finley	Lyric Theatre, Brisbane, Opera Theatre, Adelaide, Her Majesty's Theatre, Sydney, Princess Theatre, Melbourne
1994	Heartbreak House		His Majesty's Theatre, Perth with Angel Productions

== Awards and nominations ==
Year	Work	Awards	Category	Result
1976	Picnic at Hanging Rock	Australian Film Institute Awards	Best Actress in a Supporting Role	Nominated
