= Seeing Red (1992 film) =

1992 Australian drama film

- Based on: story Red Herring by Virginia Rouse
- Written by: Roger Pulvers
- Directed by: Virginia Rouse
- Starring: Zoe Carides; Anne-Louise Lambert; Peta Toppano; Anthony Brandon Wong; David Wenham
- Country of origin: Australia
- Original language: English

Production
- Producers: Tony Llewellyn-Jones; Virginia Rouse
- Cinematography: Ian Jones
- Editor: Mark Atkin
- Running time: 115 minutes
- Production company: Goomerah Films

Original release
- Release: 1992

Seeing Red is a 1992 Australian film directed by Virginia Rouse and starring Zoe Carides, Anne-Louise Lambert, Peta Toppano, and David Wenham.

== Cast ==
- Tony Llewellyn-Jones as Duncan Banks
- Anne-Louise Lambert as Amanda
- Peta Toppano as Vivien
- Zoe Carides as Red Sessions
- Henri Szeps as Louie Leeds
- George Spartels as Mark
- Hugh Llewellyn-Jones as Hugh Banks
- David Wenham as Frank No 2
- David Field as William
- Anthony Brandon Wong as Nyguen (as Anthony Wong)
- Jean Heard as Clarice
- Peter Sumner as Gorman
