= Todd Boyce =

American actor (born 1961)

- Born: July 1, 1961 (age 65)
- Occupation: Actor
- Years active: 1980–present

Todd Boyce (born July 1, 1961) is an American actor. He is known for his role as Stephen Reid in the ITV soap opera Coronation Street (1996–1997, 2007, 2022–2023).

== Career ==
Boyce joined the Australian soap opera The Restless Years in January 1980. He went on to star in the mini-series Fields of Fire. Boyce debuted in Coronation Street as Audrey Roberts' illegitimate son Stephen Reid in 1996. He has appeared in 47 episodes of the series ranging between 1996 and 2007. He returned to the series in June 2022 and left again in October 2023.

Boyce stars in the E4 comedy drama Beaver Falls as Bobby Jefferson, Head of Camp. In January 2012 he made a guest appearance in the British drama Sherlock. In August 2012, he made a guest appearance in Hollyoaks as Herb, and in 2013 he made a guest appearance in Mr Selfridge.

In 2016, he appeared in the Netflix series The Crown. His film credits include roles in I Can't Get Started (1985), The Punisher (1989), The Delinquents (1989) opposite Kylie Minogue, Blue Ice (1992), Jefferson in Paris (1995), Spy Game (2001), The Final Curtain (2002) and Flyboys (2006).

== Filmography ==
=== Film ===
Year	Title	Role	Notes
1984	One Night Stand	American Sailor	
1985	Rebel	Mary's GI	
1985	I Can't Get Started	Anthony	
1989	The Punisher	Tarrone	
1989	The Delinquents	Lyle	
1992	Blue Ice	Kyle	
1995	Jefferson in Paris	William Short	
2001	The Shaft	ESU Captain	
2001	Behind Enemy Lines	Junior Officer	
2001	Spy Game	CIA Agent Robert Aiken	
2002	The Final Curtain	Pete Lanyard	
2002	Hills Like White Elephants	The Husband	Short film
2004	Foreplay	Tom	Short film
2005	Charlie and the Chocolate Factory	TV Reporter	
2006	Penelope	Preacher	
2006	Flyboys	Mr. Jensen	
2008	The Gatekeeper	Morgan	Direct-to-video
2010	The Empty Plan	Smilgin	
2012	Kon-Tiki	Maitre D'	
2013	Kick-Ass 2	Chief of Police	
2013	The Film-Maker's Son	The American	
2014	In Clear Sight	Cooper	
2015	Everest	Frank Fishbeck	
2016	Denial	Network Reporter #3	
2016	Fantastic Beasts and Where to Find Them	Announcer	
2016	Reindeer in the Mist	Widesword	
2017	Murder on the Orient Express	Judge	
2018	Lives at Random: An Uncomfortable Truth	Narrator (voice)	
2021	The King's Man	Alfred DuPont	

=== Television ===
Year	Title	Role	Notes
1980–1981	The Restless Years	Mark Patterson	780 episodes
1986	Tusitala	Lloyd Osbourne	3 episodes
1986	Hector's Bunyip	Constable Gilbert Goode	Television film
1987	Treasure Island	Additional Voices (voice)	Television film
1987	Great Expectations: The Untold Story	Pip	Television film
1987	Vietnam	Windeat	1 episode
1987	Fields of Fire	Bluey	Main role
1987	Angel in Green		Television film
1988	Great Performances	George Armstrong	Episode: "Melba"
1991	Agatha Christie's Miss Marple (TV series) They Do It with Mirrors	Walter Hudd	Television film
1992	Screenplay	Martin	Episode: "Bad Girl"
1993	The Young Indiana Jones Chronicles	Dex	Episode: "Palestine, October 1917"
1995	Space Precinct	Morgan	Episode: "The Witness"
1996	Bugs	Doctor	Episode: "A Cage for Satan"
1996–1997, 2007, 2022–2023	Coronation Street	Stephen Reid	297 Episodes
1996	Over Here	Hewitt	Television film
1996	The Ring	Military Soldier	Television film
1997	Hostile Waters	Larry Brock	Television film
1997	The Ruby Ring	Mr. McLaughlin	Television film
1998	Unfinished Business	Cliff	1 episode
1999	The Unexpected Mrs. Pollifax	Mason	Television film
1999–2000	Home Farm Twins	Mr. Saunders	5 episodes
2000	The Bill	Piet Van Riessen	Episode: "The Driver"
2001	McCready and Daughter	Paul Nye	Episode: "The Dating Game"
2001	Strange Relations	Oncologist	Television film
2003	Adventure Inc.	Jay Canfield	Episode: "Echoes of the Past"
2003	MI-5	Troy	1 episode
2003	Hear the Silence	Simonson	Television film
2004	Seven Journeys in the American West	Francis Parkman	Television film
2005	Sometimes in April	John	Television film
2005	Space Race	Shepard	Episode: "Race to the Moon"; Documentary series
2005	Broken News	US Police Officer	Episode: "Missing Island"
2006	Assault on Waco	Byron Sage	Television film
2007	Ocean of Fear	Interviewer	Television film
2007	Locked Up Abroad	Glen Heggstad	Episode: "Colombia"
2008	Human Body: Pushing the Limits	Firefighter	Episode: "Brain Power"
2010	I Shouldn't Be Alive	Ken Hildebrand	Episode: "Crushed and Alone"
2011–2012	Beaver Falls	Bobby	12 episodes
2012	Sherlock	Neilson	Episode: "A Scandal in Belgravia"
2012	Hollyoaks	Herb Carter	11 episodes
2013	Mr. Selfridge	Mr. Crenell	1 episode
2014	Miracle Landing on the Hudson	Barry Leonard	Television film
2014	The Assets	Nichols	2 episodes
2014	The Game	Hank Chambers	1 episode
2016	Billionaire Boy	Global Newsreader	Television film
2016	The Crown	U.S.A.F. General	Episode: "Scientia Potentia Est"
2018	High & Dry	Ted	5 episodes
2021	Alex Rider	Colonel Brixham	Episode: "Hunt"
2022	A Spy Among Friends	DI John McCone	Episode: "No Man's Land"

=== Video games ===
Year	Title	Role	Notes
2012	007 Legends	Additional Voices (voice)	
2013	Company of Heroes 2	The Western Front Armies DLC, Ardennes Assault DLC (voices)	
2015	Star Wars: Battlefront	Additional Voices (voice)	
2016	Homefront: The Revolution	Additional Voices (voice)	
2016	Battlefield 1	Additional Voices (voice)	
2018	Lego The Incredibles	Additional Voices (voice)	
