= Andrew Pleavin =

English actor

- Born: 13 April 1968 (age 58); Wirral, England

Andrew Pleavin (born 13 April 1968) is an English actor known for his appearances in the TV film Attila, Unstoppable, Batman Begins, Attack of the Gryphon, Return to House on Haunted Hill and his roles in the British police dramas Messiah III: the Promise and The Bill. In February 2006, he was cast in 300 by Frank Miller, a film in which he played a character called Daxos.

Pleavin was born in England but spent his early years in Transvaal, South Africa. He returned to the UK and to the Wirral in Northern England, aged 12, and received a black belt status in martial arts at the age of 18 after six years of training in Liverpool and London.

From 1993 to 1996, he trained at the London Drama Centre.

== Filmography ==
Film
Year	Title	Role	Notes
1998	Cash in Hand	Barman	
1999	Distant Shadow	Collins	
2002	Re-inventing Eddie	Police Sergeant Carter	
2004	Unstoppable	Cherney	
2004	Playground Logic	Tony Dear	
2005	Batman Begins	Uniformed Policeman No. 2	
2005	Tuesday	Brian	Short
2006	Lipidleggin'	Peter Gurney	
2006	300	Daxos: Arcadian king	
2007	Gryphon	David	
2007	Return to House on Haunted Hill	Samuel	
2009	Blood: The Last Vampire	Frank Nielsen	
2009	Wake Up	Neil	Short
2010	Inception	Businessman	
2011	The Gift	Andrew Lascu	
2014	300: Rise of an Empire	Daxos: Arcadian king	
2014	Love by Design	Oscar	
2016	London Has Fallen	Secret Service Agent Bronson	
2016	High Strung	Slater	
2017	American Assassin	Eisenhower Captain	

Television
Year	Film	Character	Other notes
1999	The Bill	DI Cronin & Roger Dawson	4 episodes, 1999–2005
2000	Heartbeat	Al	1 episode
2001	Attila	Orestes	
2001	The Bombmaker	SAS Captain Crosbie	1 episode
2001	Doctors	Jason	1 episode
2003	Down to Earth	Sgt. Phill Gross	1 episode
2003	Wire in the Blood	Fire Chief	2 episodes 2003 & 2004
2004	Holby City	John Hughes	1 episode
2004	Messiah: The Promise	PO Darrell Teague	
2005	The Worst Week of My Life	Bowden	1 episode
2006	A Good Murder	John Palmer	
2006	Gryphon	David	
2010	Witchville	Erik	
2011	William & Catherine: A Royal Romance	Col Huntington	
