= Arnold Vosloo =

South African actor (born 1962)

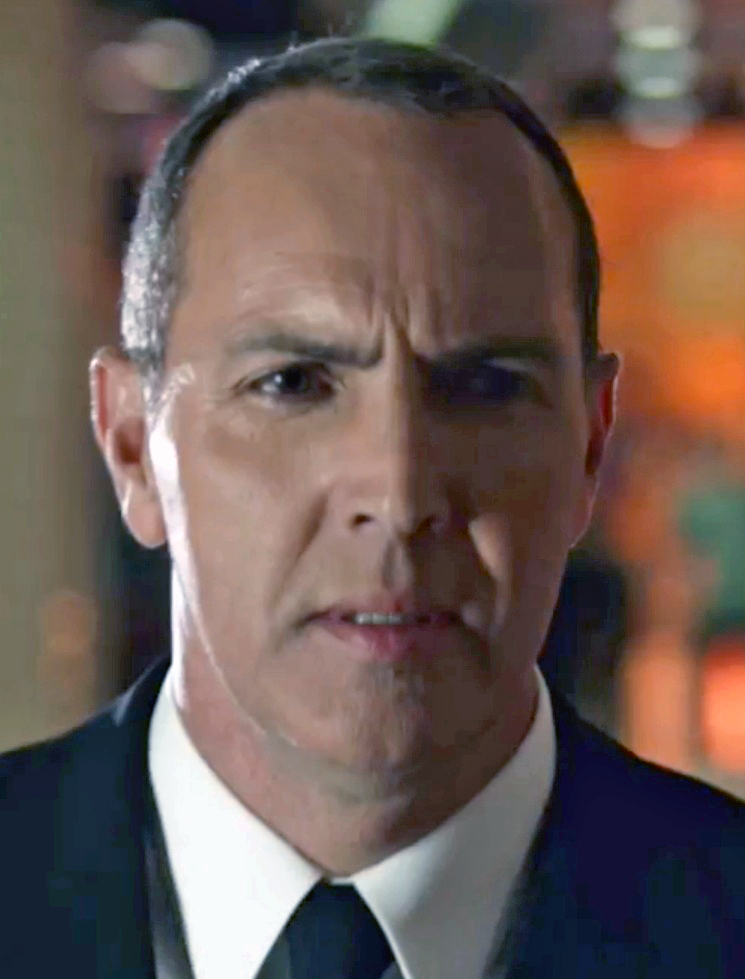
- Vosloo in 2009
- Born: 16 June 1962 (age 64); Pretoria, Transvaal Province, South Africa
- Citizenship: South Africa; United States (since 1988)
- Education: Technikon Pretoria
- Occupation: Actor
- Years active: 1983–present
- Spouses: Nancy Mulford (m. 1988; div. 1991); Sylvia Ahí (m. 1998; div. 2025)

Arnold Vosloo (born 16 June 1962) is a South African and American actor. He began his career as a stage actor and starring in South African films like Boetie Gaan Border Toe (1984). After emigrating to the United States in the late 1980s, he became known for playing villainous roles, most notably as Imhotep in The Mummy (1999) and The Mummy Returns (2001).

Vosloo is also known for his roles in Hard Target (1993), Agent Cody Banks (2003), Blood Diamond (2006), Silverton Siege (2022), and as Zartan in G.I. Joe: The Rise of Cobra (2009) and G.I. Joe: Retaliation (2013). He played terrorist Habib Marwan in the fourth season of 24 (2005), Amit Hadar on NCIS (2009–10), Robin van Rees on Cape Town (2016) and Rudy Tafero on Bosch (2017).

== Early life ==
An Afrikaner of Dutch and German ancestry, Vosloo was born into a Pretoria acting family, his parents having been stage actors. His father ran a drive-in theater in Alberton, Gauteng. He has one sister. After high school and military service (from which he received a medical discharge), he took drama courses at the Technikon Pretoria.

== Career ==
Vosloo began his acting career in South African theatre, where he won several Dalro Awards for his performances in such plays as Don Juan, Hamlet, and Môre is 'n Lang Dag (Tomorrow is a Long Day) and quickly became a regular at Pretoria's State Theatre. He also starred in Torch Song Trilogy and won another award for the TV show, Meisie van Suid-Wes (Girl from South West).

In 1984, Vosloo moved on to film where he continued Dalro Award-winning performances in films such as Boetie gaan Border toe (Boetie goes to the border, a comedy about the Border War) acting alongside fellow South African actor Frank Opperman, and Circles in a Forest (based on the book Kringe in 'n Bos by author Dalene Matthee) in 1990. Vosloo also starred in the "Boetie" sequel, Boetie op maneuvers (Boetie on maneuvers) in 1986. Next was the German three-parter Morenga (1985), Saturday Night at the Palace (based on the play by Paul Slabolepszy about racism in South Africa), Skeleton Coast (1987) and The Rutanga Tapes (1990).

Upon arriving in the U.S., Vosloo returned to the theatre where he appeared in Born in the R.S.A. at Chicago's Northlight Theatre and in the NY's Circle in the Square Uptown's short-lived production of Salomé (1992) together with Al Pacino.

His American film debut was in Gor (1987). He later appeared in the two less successful sequels to the 1990 film Darkman, Darkman II: The Return of Durant (1994) and Darkman III: Die Darkman Die (1996), filling the shoes of Liam Neeson as the title character Darkman.

Vosloo is also known for portraying villains such as in the John Woo film Hard Target (1993), starring Jean-Claude Van Damme, and the title role of the 1999 film The Mummy (starring Brendan Fraser), as well as its 2001 sequel, The Mummy Returns. In both films he played Imhotep, an ancient Egyptian high priest. Vosloo also played François Molay, the main villain's henchman, in the 2003 film Agent Cody Banks.

In 2004, The Revenge of the Mummy: The Ride opened in both Universal Studios theme parks in Orlando and Hollywood. Vosloo and Fraser were there at both openings to promote the new rides, in which both of them star, as well as featuring a life size image of Vosloo as The Mummy.

Alongside his film career, he guest-starred in several TV series, including The Red Shoe Diaries, American Gothic (1995), Nash Bridges (1995), Charmed (2000), Alias (2004) and NCIS (2009). He was one of the main characters in Veritas: The Quest (2003). He also had a major role in the fourth season of 24 (2005), as terrorist leader Habib Marwan. Vosloo appeared in three episodes of Chuck in 2009 as Fulcrum agent Vincent.

In 2004, Vosloo returned to South Africa to make Forgiveness, about an ex-policeman who seeks out the family of the anti-Apartheid activist that he killed. He played mercenary Colonel Coetzee in the 2006 film Blood Diamond, which was partially filmed in South Africa.

Vosloo has been involved in video games: his likeness, as well as his voice, was chosen for the main hero (Saul Myers) of video game Boiling Point: Road to Hell, published in the summer of 2005 by Atari.

Vosloo portrayed the Cobra mercenary and master of disguise, Zartan, in the summer 2009 release G.I. Joe: The Rise of Cobra, reprising this villainous role in the 2013 release G.I. Joe: Retaliation.

== Personal life ==
In 1988, Vosloo became a naturalized United States citizen after marrying his Act of Piracy and Skeleton Coast co-star Nancy Mulford; they divorced three years later. On 16 October 1998, he married Southern California native Silvia Ahí, a Mexican-American marketing director. Vosloo and Ahí are spokespersons for the International Fund for Animal Welfare, IFAW. Ahí filed for divorce June 2025.

In an interview with Charlie Rose, Vosloo noted he looked similar to American actor Billy Zane. According to Vosloo, when people came asking him if he was "the guy in Titanic," he would reply, "Of course, of course," as a joke.

== Filmography ==
Key
†	Denotes films that have not yet been released

=== Film ===
Year	Title	Role	Notes
1983	Funny People 2	Self-actor at interview	
1984	Boetie Gaan Border Toe	Boetie Van Tonder	
1985	Morenga	V. Schiller	
1986	Boetie Op Manoeuvres	Boetie Van Tonder	
1987	Saturday Night at the Palace	Dougie	
1987	Gor	Norman	
1987	Steel Dawn	Makker	
1988	Skeleton Coast	'Blade'	
1988	Act of Piracy	Sean Stevens	
1989	Reason to Die	Wesley Wilson	Filmed in Australia
1989	The Revenger	Mackie	
1989	Circles in a Forest	Saul Barnard	
1992	1492: Conquest of Paradise	Guevara	
1992	The Finishing Touch	Mikael Gant	
1993	Hard Target	Pik Van Cleef	
1995	Darkman II: The Return of Durant	Peyton Westlake / Darkman	Direct-to-video, replacing Liam Neeson
1996	Darkman III: Die Darkman Die	Peyton Westlake / Darkman	Direct-to-video
1997	Zeus and Roxanne	Claude Carver	
1998	Progeny	Dr. Craig Burton	
1999	The Mummy	Imhotep	
2001	The Mummy Returns	Imhotep	
2002	Con Express	General Anton Simeonov	Direct-to-video
2003	Agent Cody Banks	François Molay	
2003	Endangered Species	Warden	
2004	Forgiveness	Tertius Coetzee	
2006	Waist Deep	Police Detective #1	Uncredited
2006	Blood Diamond	Colonel Coetzee	
2006	Lasko: Death Train	Lennart	
2007	Living & Dying	Detective Rick Devlin	
2008	Odysseus: Voyage to the Underworld	Odysseus	
2008	Fire & Ice: The Dragon Chronicles	King Augustin	
2009	G.I. Joe: The Rise of Cobra	Zartan	
2010	Superman/Shazam!: The Return of Black Adam	Black Adam	Voice, short film; direct-to-video
2011	All-Star Superman	Bar-El	Voice, direct-to-video
2011	Green Lantern: Emerald Knights	Abin Sur	Voice, direct-to-video
2013	G.I. Joe: Retaliation	Zartan	
2013	Odd Thomas	Tom Jedd	
2015	Shark Killer	Nix	
2018	The Harrowing	Dr. Franklin Whitney	
2020	Griekwastad	Colonel Dick de Waal	
2022	Silverton Siege	Captain Johan Langerman	
2023	Condor's Nest	Colonel Martin Bach	
2025	Sniper: The Last Stand	Ryker Kovalov	
2025	London Calling	Harry	
2026	Ranabaali	Sir Theodore Hector	Indian-Telugu language film
2027	The Mummy: Book of the Dead †	Imhotep	Filming

=== Television ===
Year	Title	Role	Notes
1983	Meisie van Suidwes	Willem Dreyer	9-parter TV series
1988	Killer Instinct	Assad	Television film
1990	Buried Alive	Ken Wade	Television film
1992	Red Shoe Diaries	Bill	Episode: "Double Dare"
1995	American Gothic	Rafael Santo	Episode: "A Tree Grows in Trinity"
1995	Fallen Angels	MacMan	Episode: "Fly Paper"
1996	Nash Bridges	Alex Abe	Episode: "Genesis"
1999–2000	Strange World	Dark-Haired Man	3 episodes
2000	Charmed	Darklighter	Episode: "Murphy's Luck"
2003–2004	Veritas: The Quest	Vincent Siminou	13 episodes
2004	Alias	Mr. Zisman	Episode: "Crossings"
2004	Meltdown	Khalid / Sands	Television film
2005	24	Habib Marwan	17 episodes
2007	Shark	Andre Zitofsky	Episode: "Gangster Movies"
2008	Fire & Ice	King Augustin	Television film
2009	Chuck	Vincent Smith	3 episodes
2009–2010	NCIS	Mossad Officer Amit Hadar	3 episodes
2010	Psych	J.T. Waring	Episode: "A Very Juliet Episode"
2011	Young Justice	Kobra	Voice, episode: "Drop-Zone"
2011	Bones	Jacob Broadsky	3 episodes
2013	Elementary	Christos Theophilus	Episode: "Heroine"
2014	Crisis	Jakob Vries	2 episodes
2015	Grimm	Jonathon Wilde	Episode: "Maréchaussée"
2016	Criminal Minds: Beyond Borders	Armand Smit	Episode: "Iqiniso"
2016	Cape Town	Robin Van Rees	6 episodes
2017	Voltron: Legendary Defender	Ulaz	Voice, episode: "Shiro's Escape"
2017	Bosch	Rudy Tafero	9 episodes
2019	The Blacklist	Marko Jankowics	Episode: "Marko Jankowics (No. 58)"
2019	Tom Clancy's Jack Ryan	Jost Van Der Byl	4 episodes
2022	Ludik	Daan Ludik	6 episodes
2024	Plan B	Paul Schmidt	5 episodes
2026	The Terminal List	Richard "Rich" Hastings	2 episodes

=== Video games ===
Year	Title	Voice role
2005	Boiling Point: Road to Hell	Saul Myers
2007	Stranglehold	Damon Zakarov
