= Georgine Anderson =

British actress (1928–2024)

- Born: February 8, 1928
- Died: February 15, 2024 (aged 96)
- Occupation: Actress
- Years active: 1958-2014

Georgine Anderson (8 February 1928 – 15 February 2024) was a British actress. She had a career spanning seven decades working in the Royal Shakespeare Company, the West End and in television productions. She was most known for starring in such programmes as The Woman in White (1982), Persuasion (1971) and The Prime of Miss Jean Brodie (1978).

== Acting credits ==
Title	Year	Role	Notes	Ref.
Private Investigator	1958	Angela Waite (as George Anderson)	TV Series	
BBC Sunday-Night Theatre	1959	Ann Crichton	TV Series	
A Midsummer Night's Dream	1959	Fairy	TV Movie	
No Hiding Place	1961	Lucy Worth	TV Series (2 episodes)	
The Queen and the Rebels	1963	Elizabetta	TV Series (3 episodes)	
Coronation Street	1971	Miss Muldoon	Soap Opera	
Undermind	1965	Receptionist	TV Series	
Dixon of Dock Green	1967	Magistrate	TV Series	
Biography	1970	Bettina von Breitkopf	TV Series	
Fraud Squad	1970	Alice Harland	TV Series	
Special Branch	1969	Mrs. Bishop	TV Series	
The Main Chance	1969	Mrs. Kellaway	TV Series	
Sanctuary	1968	Sister Thomas	TV Series	
Dixon of Dock Green	1967	Magistrate	TV Series	
A Family at War	1971–1972	Helen Hughes	TV Series	
Persuasion	1971	Mrs. Croft	TV Mini Series	
Coronation Street	1971	Mrs. Fielding	Soap Opera	
The Organization	1972	Beryl (uncredited)	TV Series	
Villains	1972	Health Visitor	TV Series	
Crown Court	1973	Mrs. Whittaker	TV Series	
Thriller	1973	Jane	TV Series	
A Pin to See the Peepshow	1973	Bertha Starling	TV Series	
Marked Personal	1974	Nora	TV Series	
Centre Play	1974	Evelyn	TV Series	
Play for Today	1974–1975	Helen Childers, Mrs. Franklin	Episode: Penda's Fen	
The Hanged Man	1975	Dorothy Graham	TV Mini Series	
Upstairs, Downstairs	1975	Mrs. McKay	TV Series	
The Glittering Prizes	1976	Marigold	TV Mini Series	
Esther Waters	1977	Miss Rice	TV Series	
Sister Dora	1977	Mrs. Pattison	TV Mini Series	
Love for Lydia	1977	Mrs. Holland	TV Series	
BBC2 Play of the Week	1978	Ms. H2A	TV Series	
The Prime of Miss Jean Brodie	1978	Miss Gaunt	TV Series	
Armchair Thriller	1978	Mrs. Forde	TV Series	
Playhouse	1977–1979	Mrs. Allinson, Mrs. Smith	TV Series	
Matilda's England	1979	Miss Pritchard	TV Mini Series	
A Family Affair	1979	Miss Richards	TV Mini Series	
Enemy at the Door	1980	Marjory Clifford	TV Series	
Cribb	1980	Winifred Probert	TV Series	
From a Far Country	1981	Woman		
The Woman in White	1982	Countess Fosco	TV Mini Series	
Cousin Phillis	1982	Margaret Holman	TV Series	
Secrets	1983	Matron	TV Series	
Storyboard	1983	Mrs. Rennie	TV Series	
Angels	1976–1983	Sister Bernard, Rose Rutherford	TV Series	
Invitation to the Wedding	1983	2nd Woman	TV Series	
The Jewel in the Crown	1984	Mrs. Hobhouse	TV Series	
Sharing Time	1984	Mrs. Quigley	TV Series	
Thirty-Minute Theatre	1984	Mrs. Roseacre (voice)	TV Series	
Hallelujah!	1984	Mrs. Fishwick	TV Series	
Blott on the Landscape	1985	Mrs. Bullett-Finch	TV Mini Series	
Time for Murder	1985	Christine Turner	TV Series	
Harem	1986	Aunt Lily	TV Movie	
Auf Wiedersehen, Pet	1986	Pauline Oxlade	TV Series	
Take the High Road	1986	Joyce Cameron	TV Series	
Agatha Christie's Miss Marple: Sleeping Murder	1987	Mrs. Hengrave	TV Movie	
Never the Twain	1988	Sybil Wainwright	TV Series	
Campion	1989	Mrs. Turner	TV Series	
The Campbells	1990	Miss MacKay	TV Series	
Harry Enfield's Television Programme	1990	Librarian	TV Series	
Taggart	1990	Lena Henderson	TV Series	
Growing Pains	1992	Olive	TV Series	
Century Falls	1993	May Harkness	TV Mini Series	
Wycliffe	1994	Barbara Prout	TV Series	
Screen Two	1991–1994	Old Lady, Elsie Mont	TV Series	
Coronation Street	1995	Eunice Watts	Soap Opera	
Murder Most Horrid	1996	Mrs. Stewart	TV Series	
Douglas	1996	Joan Beaumont	TV Series (Pilot)	
In Suspicious Circumstances	1996	Mistress Odingsells	TV Series	
An Unsuitable Job for a Woman	1997	Mrs. Goddard	TV Series	
Jonathan Creek	1998	Gwynneth Sweetland	TV Series	
Baby Doll	2000	Rose	Stage Play	
Midsomer Murders	2000	Madge Fielding	Episode: "Blue Herrings"	
Heartbeat	2001	Minnie Bateson	TV Series	
The Cazalets	2001	Miss Treeves	TV Series	
The Infinite Worlds of H. G. Wells	2001	Miss Price	TV Mini Series	
Holby City	2004	Alice Mason	TV Series	
All About George	2005	Muriel	TV Series	
Casualty	1990–2006	Brenda Gayton, Lillian Hogarth	TV Series	
Midsomer Murders	2006	Rosemary Wood	Episode: "Dance with the Dead"	
Doctor Who	2007	May	Episode: "Gridlock"	
Inspector George Gently	2009	Enid Peachment	TV Series	
Whitechapel	2013	Cecilia Cade	TV Series	
New Tricks	2014	Peggy	TV Series	
