= Stuart M. Besser =

American actor

Stuart Besser is a film producer. He has also appeared as an actor in one film, Identity.

== Filmography as producer ==
- The People Under the Stairs
- The Break-Up
- Vampire in Brooklyn
- Dr. Giggles
- Love at Large
- Mile 22
- Scream
- Scream 3
- Molly's Game
- The Trial of the Chicago 7
- Being the Ricardos
- The Social Reckoning
