= Fields of Fire (miniseries) =

1987 Australian series about cane cutters

- Based on: Cane by Robert Donaldson
- Written by: Miranda Downes; Robert Marchand
- Directed by: Robert Marchand
- Starring: Todd Boyce; Melissa Docker; Kris McQuade; Nicholas Hammond
- Country of origin: Australia
- Original language: English
- No. of episodes: 2 x 2 hours

Production
- Producers: David Elfick; Steve Knapman
- Budget: $4 million

Original release
- Network: Nine Network
- Release: 14 June – 15 June 1987

Fields of Fire is a 1987 Australian mini series about cane cutters in Queensland just prior to and during World War II.

== Plot ==
In 1938, Englishman Bluey arrives in the north Queensland town of Silkwood. Two sisters are interested in him, Kate and Dusty. Their mother is Silkwood's matriarch.

== Production ==
The budget was $4 million, $150,000 of which came from the Queensland Film Corporation. It was shot in Harwood Island, Ulmarra, Clarence River.

== Fields of Fire II ==
Fields of Fire
- Also known as: Fields of Fire II
- Based on: David Elfick; Robert Marchand
- Written by: Patricia Johnson
- Directed by: Robert Marchand; David Elfick
- Starring: Todd Boyce; Melissa Docker; Anne Louise Lambert; Joseph Spano; Nicholas Hammond
- No. of episodes: 2 x 2 hours

Production
- Producers: David Elfick; Irene Korol
- Budget: $3.75 million

Original release
- Network: Nine Network
- Release: 22 May – 23 May 1988

Fields of Fire II is a 1988 sequel set in the late 1940s.

=== Plot ===
In 1946 Franco becomes a black marketeer and marries Gina. Bluey marries Dusty after the war.

== Fields of Fire III ==
Fields of Fire
- Also known as: Fields of Fire III
- Written by: Patricia Johnson
- Directed by: David Elfick; Irene Korol
- Starring: Peta Toppano; Noni Hazlehurst; Nicholas Hammond
- No. of episodes: 2 x 2 hours

Original release
- Network: Nine Network
- Release: 16 July – 17 July 1989

There was a third Fields of Fire in 1988 which dealt with the story in the 1950s.

=== Plot ===
In 1951 Gina and her brother Paolo are successful cane growers. Gina is attracted to Rinaldo. The Menzies government holds an anti-communist referendum.

== Main cast list ==
Character	Actor	Series		
Character	Actor	Fields of Fire	Fields of Fire II	Fields of Fire III
Bluey	Todd Boyce			
Dusty	Melissa Docker			
Burgess	Nicholas Hammond			
Elsie	Kris McQuade			
Kate	Anna Hruby			
Kate	Anne-Louise Lambert			
Tiny	Ollie Hall			
Jacko	John Jarratt			
Whacker	Harold Hopkins			
Chook	Patrick Ward			
Acreman	Paul Bertram			
Dave	Ken Radley			
Albie	Philip Quast			
Red	Jack Mayers			
Lofty	Bill Young			
Franco	Terry Serio			
Franco	Joseph Spano			
Gina	Peta Toppano			
Paolo	Robert Ruggiero			
Shorty	Dan Simmonds			
Shorty	Danny Ruggiero			
Dawn	Noni Hazlehurst			
Rinaldo	Martin Sacks			
Basia	Gosia Dobrowolska			
Iris	Michele Fawdon			
