= Boetie Gaan Border Toe =

- Directed by: Regardt van den Bergh
- Written by: Johan Coetzee, Cor Nortjé
- Produced by: Philo Pieterse
- Starring: Arnold Vosloo; Eric Nobbs Frank Dankert
- Release date: 1984
- Running time: 94 minutes
- Country: South Africa
- Language: Afrikaans

Boetie Gaan Border Toe is a 1984 satire film set during the South African Border War. The film was directed by Regardt van den Bergh, and stars Arnold Vosloo (his film debut), Frank Dankert and Frank Opperman. Production was assisted by the South African Defence Force (SADF).

== Plot ==
Boetie van Tonder, a young Afrikaner, faces conscription into the South African military. Although initially determined to resist national service and defy instruction, he quickly finds comfort in the company of his fellow conscripts as they weather the harshness of basic training and their subsequent deployment to the Angolan border.

== Cast ==
- Arnold Vosloo as Boetie van Tonder
- Eric Nobbs as Korporaal Botes
- Frank Dankert as Dampies Ball
- Kelsey Middleton as Jenny Ball
- Janie du Plessis as Elize
- Kerneels Coertzen as Davel
- Pagel Kruger as Mnr. Moerdijk
- William Abdul as James
- Frank Opperman as De Kock
- Blake Toerien as Piet Slabbert
- Christo Loots as Sunshine
- Neels Engelbrecht as Gattie
- Rudi De Jager as Meyer
- Bobbette Fouche as Mev. Moerdijk
- Graham Clarke as Dokter
- Gys de Villiers as Korporaal Smit
- Jacques Loots as Politikus
- Jana Cilliers as Lecturer (dosent)
- Gretha Brazelle as Charmaine

== Reception ==
Literary analyst Monica Popescu described Boetie Gaan Border Toe and its sequel, Boetie Op Manoeuvres, as works which essentially romanticised the South African Border War and devoted a disproportionate amount of emphasis to the "chivalrous conduct of SADF soldiers". Keyan Tomaselli of the University of Johannesburg criticised the film as "propagandistic".

Boetie Gaan Border Toe was a financial success, breaking South African box office records.
