= Ollie Hall =

Rugby player (1952–2020)

- Full name: Oliver Bythe Hall
- Born: 20 March 1952 Wellington, NSW, Australia
- Died: 13 November 2020 (aged 68)
- School: The King's School
- Occupation: Actor / Farmer

Rugby union career
- Position: Prop
International career
Years	Team	Apps	(Points)
1983	Australia		

Oliver Bythe Hall (20 March 1952 — 13 November 2020) was an Australian actor and rugby union player.

== Biography ==
Born in Wellington, New South Wales, Hall was the son of a grazier and grew up on the family farm. He boarded at The King's School in Sydney and as a First VIII rower won the 1970 Head of the River regatta for the school. After playing his schoolboy rugby in the 2nd XV, Hall joined Yeoval on his return home and his game quickly developed under renowned country rugby coach John Stanbrook, gaining Central West representative selection in 1972. He played his early rugby as a lock before he transitioned in 1978 to the front row.

Hall played rugby in Sydney's Shute Shield competition for Manly and was named "best clubman" in his first season in 1982. He was a member of Manly's 1983 premiership team coached by future Wallabies coach Alan Jones. Three months after making his New South Wales representative debut, against Argentina in Sydney, Hall was one of five Wallabies rookies to achieve selection for the 1983 tour of Italy and France. He played five uncapped matches during the tour. His career was then undone by persistent knee injuries and after numerous surgeries he transitioned into acting.

As an actor, Hall had several film and television roles, mainly in the late 1980s. Most notably, he featured in the 1985 film Mad Max Beyond Thunderdome, as a guard to Tina Turner's character. He also had a recurring role as Tiny in the 1987 mini series Fields of Fire.

== Filmography ==
=== Film ===
Year	Title	Role
1985	Mad Max Beyond Thunderdome	Aunty's Guard
1986	Dead End Drive-In	Frank
1986	Short Changed	Officer Collins
1988	Young Einstein	Darwin's Bodyguard
1990	Quigley Down Under	Carver
1992	Eight Ball	Eric Biggs

=== Television ===
Year	Title	Role	Notes
1985	Shout! The Story of Johnny O'Keefe		2 episodes
1986	Shark's Paradise	Smith	TV Movie
1987	Fields of Fire	Tiny	2 episodes
1987	The Lizard King	Frank	TV Movie
1988	Fields of Fire II	Tiny	2 episodes
1988	Richmond Hill	Cuddles	1 episode
1988	Act of Betrayal	Big Man	2 episodes
1988	Joe Wilson	Trooper McCaffrey	1 episode
1989	The Magistrate	Wayne	2 episodes
1989	Fields of Fire III	Tiny	2 episodes

== See also ==
- List of Australia national rugby union players
