= Gryphon (film) =

- Written by: Kenneth M. Badish; Boaz Davidson; Abram Cox; Sean Keller
- Directed by: Andrew Prowse
- Starring: Amber Benson; Jonathan LaPaglia; Larry Drake
- Country of origin: United States
- Original language: English

Production
- Running time: 89 minutes

Original release
- Network: Sci Fi Channel
- Release: January 27, 2007

Gryphon also known as Attack of the Gryphon is a 2007 television film directed by Andrew Prowse, starring Amber Benson, Jonathan LaPaglia, and Larry Drake. It premiered on the Sci-Fi Channel on January 27, 2007.

The television film continues a tradition of science fiction films featuring computer-animated monsters that have been part of the Sci-Fi Pictures original films series since its inception in 2002. These include Sabertooth (2002), Rottweiler (2004), Mansquito (2005), Hammerhead: Shark Frenzy (2005), Pterodactyl (2005), Minotaur (2006), and Mammoth (2006).

== Plot ==
Following the conflict between two princes of kingdom of Vallon, Lock and Delphus, who fight over their father's throne and culminated to the latter's defeat in a single combat 300 years prior to the present, the land had since split into two rivaling nations; Lockland and Delphi. At the eve of Lockland's destruction, the desperate Locklander king turns to his chief sorcerer Armand (Larry Drake) for help after his castle is besieged and his son and crown prince got killed in the ensuing struggle against the counsel of Amelia (Amber Benson), the prince's brother. With aid of a portion of the king's blood as well as his own, Armand brings a stone statue of a gryphon, a flying beast that is the totem of Lockland, to life against the invaders. As Amelia feared, shortly after the invading army has been dealt with, Armand wasted no time to turn against his king and the rest of the Locklanders in a coup with the gryphon on his side. Although the blood binding Armand established between him and the gryphon allows him to control it and renders it unkillable through conventional means, their connection resulted the sorcerer to feel the beast's pain.

Princess Amelia escapes during the takeover and pursues the retreating Locklanders, led the Delphite prince Seth (Jonathan LaPaglia), who had been in the vanguard of the besieging forces. Having inherited the gift of magical visions from his parents, the prince is advised by his mother Cassandra (Sarah Douglas), a sorceress, to seek an artifact called the Draconian Pike, the only weapon that can kill the gryphon. His mother warns him that he must retrieve the two halves of the pike and reassemble it to kill the gryphon before a solar eclipse occurs in two weeks, or Armand will be able to enact a ritual that makes himself and the beast immortal.

Amelia and her retinue capture Seth and his man-at-arms, David (Andrew Pleavin), during a night raid on their camp in a location called The Valley of the Dead. They locate the haft of the Draconian Pike in a centuries-old temple. Fending off an attack by the gryphon by means of "dragon's fire" (apparently black powder or an explosive variant of Greek fire), they escape and move on to seeking the blade. Meanwhile, Armand attempts to foment mistrust between the two rival nations by killing a Locklander messenger and sending his body to Amelia's father, a threat against her life magically scored into his chest. The king of Lockland calls for his armor and mounts a counter-invasion of Delphi. Meanwhile, Amelia confronts Seth at knife-point in his tent, demanding that he tell her where the blade is, but she lets her guard down momentarily and he takes advantage, seizing the knife; they fall into an amorous embrace. That same night, Armand sends his two magic-wielding brides, Daphne and Kyra, to seduce one of the Locklander soldiers into stealing the haft piece from Amelia and Seth. When Seth and Amelia find it gone the next morning, they decide to send messengers to their respective parents to muster the combined armies of Lockland and Delphi. Amelia and her remaining knights attack Armand's lair, while Seth and his retainer David enter a magically-warded labyrinth to retrieve the blade.

The two kings call a truce and their armies prepare for a massed assault, while the gryphon prepares to destroy them. Queen Cassandra of Delphi bids her husband farewell and rides into the deserted stronghold of the enemy. Once Seth retrieves the blade, he rushes to the sorcerer's lair to confront him, but finds his path blocked by the sorcerer's brides. Cassandra tells her son to leave the sorceresses to her and go to dispatch the gryphon, sacrificing herself in a magical strike against them. Meanwhile, Armand has captured Amelia and killed the Locklander knight champion, and demands that she become his bride. Seth and David arrive and fight with the sorcerer, but soon loses the blade of the Draconian Pike. Assembling the pike, Armand kills David and prepares to kill the Delphite Prince, but is persuaded to spare him by the surrender of Amelia. As the eclipse begins, Armand proclaims that he will soon become an immortal and that his progeny with Amelia will be the new Titans. As he walks away from the defeated Delphite Prince, his hand touches Amelia's belly and he realizes that she is already pregnant with the prince's child. Furious, he rejects her and prepares to kill them both. A struggle ensues and Armand again knocks the prince to his knees, but is unable to deliver the coup de grace because the Delphite queen's spirit still protects her son. The sorcerer calls the gryphon down on the prince, to whom the princess tosses the Draconian Pike. It appears as if Seth is charging for the sorcerer, but instead hops onto a rock and turns just in time to level the pike at the stooping gryphon, impaling it. The gryphon reverts to stone and shatters as it falls to the ground, while the sorcerer dissolves into a pool of blood.

The armies of Lockland and Delphi rejoice at their deliverance, cheering as Amelia and Seth raise the reassembled Draconian Pike overhead to symbolize the reunion of the sundered kingdoms of Vallon. In a voice over, Amelia proclaims that the curse of civil war has been lifted.

== Cast ==
- Jonathan LaPaglia as Prince Seth of Delphi
- Larry Drake as Armand The Sorcerer
- Amber Benson as Princess Amelia of Lockland
- Andrew Pleavin as David
- Douglas Roberts as General Gorwin
- Ashley Artus as Gerard
- Sarah Douglas as Queen Cassandra of Delphi
- Amy Gillespie as Daphne
- Simone Levin as Kyra
- Adrian Pintea as King Phillip of Lockland
- Ștefan Velniciuc as General Orina
- Ciprian Dumitrascu as Lock
- Vlad Jacob as Delphus
- Radu Andrei Micu as Sir Patrick of Delphi
