= Darkman II: The Return of Durant =

1995 film by Bradford May

- Official DVD cover
- Directed by: Bradford May
- Screenplay by: Steven McKay
- Story by: Robert Eisele; Lawrence Hertzog
- Based on: Characters by Sam Raimi
- Produced by: David Roessell
- Starring: Arnold Vosloo; Larry Drake; Kim Delaney; Renee O'Connor; Lawrence Dane
- Cinematography: Bradford May
- Edited by: Daniel Cahn
- Music by: Randy Miller
- Production companies: Universal Productions Canada; Renaissance Pictures
- Distributed by: MCA Universal Home Video
- Release date: July 11, 1995
- Running time: 93 minutes
- Countries: Canada; United States
- Language: English
- Budget: $4 million

Darkman II: The Return of Durant is a 1995 Canadian-American superhero film directed by Bradford May. It is a direct-to-video sequel to the film Darkman, with series creator Sam Raimi serving as executive producer. Arnold Vosloo succeeds Liam Neeson as the title character, who attempts to recover an experimental superweapon from his nemesis Robert G. Durant, once again played by Larry Drake. It was followed by the third installment in the trilogy, Darkman III: Die Darkman Die.

== Plot ==
Sometime after taking down crime-boss Robert G. Durant and his associates, brutally-scarred scientist Peyton Westlake continues to work on perfecting his synthetic skin formula, funding his research by stealing from criminals as the vigilante "Darkman". His synthetic skin is still limited by photosensitivity, only able to last 99 minutes in light before breaking down. Durant, left in a coma by his previous encounter with Westlake, suddenly awakens. He quickly assembles some of his former associates and has them break a brilliant criminal named Dr. Alfred Hathaway out of prison. Hathaway had previously begun designing highly-experimental particle-beam weaponry; Durant wants him to complete the design so they can sell the futuristic weapons on the black market.

Westlake, wearing a disguise and using a false name, meets and befriends a scientist named David Brinkman, who is also working on a similar synthetic skin formula. Brinkman has been able to break past the 99-minute photosensitivity barrier of Westlake's synthetic skin, though his formula similarly is not permanent. Westlake suggests the two form a partnership to finally crack the code to creating permanent skin; Brinkman happily agrees. Westlake also briefly meets Brinkman's sister Laurie, who is on shaky terms with her brother.

Durant realizes that Brinkman's lab is one of the only buildings in the city that has the power requirements needed for his plans. After Brinkman firmly refuses his offers to buy the building, Durant has his men torture and murder Brinkman in retaliation. Westlake discovers Brinkman's body and notices that one of his fingers has been cut off, matching Durant's calling card of collecting a finger from his victims. Realizing that his old nemesis is still alive, Westlake vows revenge. Hathaway completes his particle-beam weapons, which hold devastating power and are able to blow up small buildings with a single blast. Durant lines up his first buyers, a group of white supremacists.

After seeing a news story on Durant, Westlake meets with hot-shot television reporter Jill Randall to get more information from her. She runs his fingerprints after becoming suspicious with his secret behavior. She tracks him down and deduces his true identity. She reveals that she is investigating Durant's possible return, and Westlake begins to begrudgingly work alongside and befriend her. However, when Randall runs a last-minute news-report on Durant's return, he has her killed with a car bomb, further infuriating Westlake.

Westlake learns that Durant is again seeking to purchase Brinkman's building, this time from the grieving Laurie. He sets out to protect her, but is unable to stop Durant from kidnapping her after she refuses to sell. Westlake uses his synthetic skin to disguise himself as Durant's thugs and infiltrate their base of operations. In an ensuing battle, Durant's men, Dr. Hathaway, and the white supremacists are all killed. Westlake saves Laurie while Durant attempts to flee in his car. However, Durant doesn't realize until it's too late that Westlake has taken a page from his own book and rigged his car with a bomb; he is finally killed once and for all in the blast.

Westlake bids Laurie farewell, and later sees a news report on Randall's death. Tipping his hat to the memory of his friends, Westlake vows to continue his lone fight against crime and injustice.

== Cast ==
- Arnold Vosloo as Dr. Peyton Westlake / Darkman
- Larry Drake as Robert G. Durant
- Kim Delaney as Jill Randall
- Renee O'Connor as Laurie Brinkman
- Lawrence Dane as Dr. Alfred Hathaway
- Jesse Collins as Dr. David Brinkman
- David Ferry as Eddie Scully
- Rod Wilson as Ivan Druganov
- Jack Langedijk as Rollo Latham
- Sten Eirik as "Whitey"
- Steve Mousseau as Roy
- James Millington as Mr. Perkins
- Kevin Rushton as Skinhead
- Phillip Jarrett as Dan
- Catherine Swing as Bonnie Cisco
- Graham Rowat as Bob, The Producer
- Chris Gillett as Bob's Boss
- David Clement as Detective Stringer
- Donna Mullin as Miss S&M

== Production ==
=== Development and writing ===
The original Darkman was a modest success in theaters, but it made more money on home video. Shortly after it was released, major rental chain Blockbuster Video appealed to Universal for a sequel. The studio was unenthusiastic about a theatrical follow-up, as the original's good, not great receipts, combined with the usual decrease in revenue incurred by sequels, made it a risky proposition. A pilot for a potential series, which featured Larry Drake as Robert G. Durant but was more reboot than sequel, was shot in early 1992. It was considered by Fox alongside another Renaissance Pictures show, M.A.N.T.I.S., but only the second was picked up. Later that year, Universal announced that it would retool the Darkman franchise as a pair of direct-to-video films.

Darkman II was billed as the first direct-to-video live action film produced under the Universal Pictures banner. However, a number of television films made by Universal Television subsidiary MCA Television Entertainment (MTE) had already been released on physical media by MCA/Universal Home Video. Among those were sequels to Universal classics like Psycho IV and The Birds II. While those premiered on Showtime before their video release, the concept was similar. In fact, half of the budget for the Darkman sequels came from Universal's television division, while the rest came from its home video division.

TV veteran Bradford May, who had directed two features for MTE, was originally approached to helm some Hercules television films that Renaissance had tabbed for MCA Television's Action Pack syndication package. He could not come to financial and creative terms with the production, but was offered the Darkman sequels as an alternative, and accepted. David Roessel, already a producer on the unreleased Darkman pilot and the short lived M.A.N.T.I.S., was the main producer in charge of both sequels.

During production, the screenplay was credited to Steven McKay and Chuck Pfarrer, a co-writer on the original, but Pfarrer was not mentioned in the final film. Lawrence Hertzog, who wrote one of the screenplay drafts, received a story credit, as did MCA regular Robert Eisele, writer of The Birds II, the Action Pack's Vanishing Son and the unreleased Darkman pilot. May says he also performed a couple of uncredited rewrites, although it is unclear which of the sequels he contributed to. Canadian composer Paul Zaza was originally approached to score one or both of the sequels. He declined out of loyalty to longtime friend Bob Clark, who had a job lined up for him, although he later regretted turning down the opportunity to work for Raimi.

Arnold Vosloo was approached to take over the role of Payton Westlake during the filming of another Renaissance production, Hard Target, in which he played one half of the villainous duo. Renaissance regular Renee O'Connor, then between her roles as Deianeira and Gabrielle in the Hercules/Xena universe, also appears.

=== Filming ===
Both Darkman II and III were filmed in Toronto with much of the same crew. The films were shot in quick succession, although not strictly back-to-back. A four-week break was planned between the two shoots, but it was extended after the Northridge Earthquake. Due to Larry Drake's prior commitments, his sequel was shot second, although it ended up being released first. For this reason, the film was known at the start of production as Darkman III: Durant Returns. Photography was listed as starting on March 15, 1994. The Return of Durant was budgeted at US$4 million.

Special make-up effects were overseen by frequent Raimi collaborators KNB EFX Group. Each of the single-use masks worn by Vosloo cost US$10,000. According to May, the opening car chase featured the first cannon-based barrel roll in the history of the Toronto film industry.

== Release ==
=== Theatrical preview ===
Darkman II was screened at an AMC theater in Fort Lauderdale, Florida, in presence of Arnold Vosloo and several executives at locally headquartered company Blockbuster Video, around two months prior to its national home video release. A contemporary Billboard magazine write-up suggests that the special showing was open to the general public.

=== Home media ===
According to director May, Universal considered releasing Darkman II in theaters after seeing the completed film; Universal eventually decided against it as some of the low budget visual effects betrayed its small screen roots. The film's sales campaign was backed by a standalone videocassette sent to rental stores nationwide, which featured a behind-the-scenes documentary and promotional pitch.

Darkman II was released on VHS tape on July 11, 1995. As per industry standards, the Laserdisc followed one week later on July 18. The film peaked at 28 in the Billboard video rental charts, spending two weeks in the top 40.

The Return of Durant was re-issued on DVD by Universal on January 5, 1999. It included production notes, cast & crew biographies, and a trailer. Shout! Factory released a special edition Blu-ray of the film on November 7, 2017. It features a new feature-length audio commentary from director Bradford May, and a standard definition print of the film's television version.

=== Television ===
Due to the novelty of direct-to-video sequels to studio films, some early examples of the format were given a primetime network TV broadcast. Darkman II was shown on July 7, 1998, on Fox. Airing opposite the MLB All-Star Game, The Return of Durant performed poorly, garnering a 2.8 rating and a 5 share. It received notice for being the lowest rated film in the history of the network up to that point. The film's television version includes a small amount of additional and alternate footage.

== Reception ==
One Rotten Tomatoes, the film holds a 48% approval rating based on 23 reviews, with the consensus summarizing: "Without the gothic melodrama and berserk wit of its predecessor, Darkman II: The Return of Durant struggles to rise above its made-for-video roots despite flashes of fun and admirable cinematic ambition."

TV Guide gave the film two stars out of five and said, "without the hyperbolic style of Raimi [and his] sustained visual dazzle—here supplied mainly in flashbacks—Darkman, well, pales." Richard Scheib of Moria Reviews was similarly unimpressed, writing that "on the whole, it is an entirely average effort" and "director Bradford May gives it the frustratingly banal look of a made-for-TV movie." He also rated it a two out of five. Hock Teh of IGN rated the film five out of ten and assessed that "Darkman II lost the comic book experience present in the first movie and in its place is a straight-up action flick with some major plot holes."

Ian Jane of DVDTalk was more positive, judging that "[p]layed with slightly more serious intent than its predecessor, Darkman II isn't bad for a low budget sequel."

== Sequel ==
The film was followed by a third and final entry in the series, Darkman III: Die Darkman Die, which was also released direct-to-video on August 20, 1996.
