= The Woman in White (1982 TV series) =

- Genre: Mystery
- Based on: The Woman in White by Wilkie Collins
- Written by: Ray Jenkins
- Directed by: John Bruce
- Starring: Diana Quick; Ian Richardson; Jenny Seagrove
- Composer: Patrick Gowers
- Country of origin: United Kingdom
- Original language: English
- No. of series: 1
- No. of episodes: 5

Production
- Producer: Jonathan Powell
- Running time: 55 minutes
- Production company: BBC

Original release
- Network: BBC Two
- Release: 14 April – 12 May 1982

The Woman in White is a British mystery television series adapted from the novel of the same title by Wilkie Collins. It first aired on BBC 2 in five parts between 14 April and 12 May 1982.

== Main cast ==
- Diana Quick as Marian Halcombe
- Ian Richardson as Frederick Fairlie
- John Shrapnel as Sir Percival Glyde
- Jenny Seagrove as Laura Fairlie
- Kevin Elyot as Louis
- Alan Badel as Count Fosco
- Daniel Gerroll as Walter Hartright
- Georgine Anderson as Countess Fosco
- Anna Lindup as Fanny
- Deirdra Morris as Anne Catherick
- Anna Wing as Mrs Clements
- Carol MacReady as Mrs Michelson
- Jeannie Crowther as Margaret Porcher
- Andrew Carr as Fletcher
- Hilary Sesta as Madame Rubelle
- Pauline Jameson as Mrs Catherick

== Bibliography ==
- Baskin, Ellen. Serials on British Television, 1950-1994. Scolar Press, 1996.
- Miller, Ron. Mystery Classics on Film: The Adaptation of 65 Novels and Stories. McFarland, 2017.
