= Darkman (character) =

Fictional character, in Darkman films

- Darkman character
- Liam Neeson as Darkman
- First appearance: Darkman
- Created by: Sam Raimi
- Portrayed by: Liam Neeson (Darkman); Christopher Bowen (Unaired pilot); Arnold Vosloo (Darkman II: The Return of Durant and Darkman III: Die Darkman Die)

In-universe information
- Full name: Peyton Westlake
- Alias: Dr. Peyton Westlake
- Gender: Male
- Occupation: Former scientist Vigilante
- Abilities: Expert scientist Master of disguise and stealth Skilled hand-to-hand combatant Genius-level intelligence Enhanced strength, speed, agility, and stamina Use of synthetic skin Immunity to pain

Darkman (Peyton Westlake) is a superhero and the protagonist of the 1990 superhero film Darkman and its sequels, Darkman II: The Return of Durant and Darkman III: Die Darkman Die. The character originated in a short story titled "The Darkman" written by the film's director, Sam Raimi. He was portrayed by Liam Neeson in the original film and Arnold Vosloo in the sequels.

== Fictional character biography ==
In the third film and the un-aired television pilot, his biography is slightly retconned, but the character's canonical history is as such: Peyton Westlake was a mild-mannered and brilliant scientist working on a synthetic "skin" capable of aiding burn victims. He had a good relationship with district attorney Julie Hastings, who indirectly caused his injuries by telling corrupt developer Louis Strack Jr. that he could not build his "city of the future" without a permission document from Westlake's laboratory. At this, Strack hired sadistic mobster Robert G. Durant to get the document and in the process, Durant and his gang brutally disfigured Westlake, killed his assistant and destroyed his lab.

Julie believed he was dead and a funeral was held, but Westlake's hideous body was placed in a clinic and was used for various experiments to sever Westlake's pain receptors, which enhances his strength but leaves him unable to feel tactile sensations. The experiments, however, affected Westlake's mental stability and he became an impulsive, bipolar, sarcastic, and violent man. Westlake escaped the clinic and sought refuge in an abandoned building in the film's city. He hid his grotesque appearance with bandages and a trenchcoat and used his synthetic skin, which only lasts 99 minutes in the light. He managed to rebuild a relationship with Julie, claiming he survived his "accident" and constantly fleeing so that she does not see his true face. As "Darkman", he begins ruining Durant's illegal activities by framing his gang so Durant kills his own men, including his possible implied lover. After discovering the culprit is Darkman, Durant attempts to kill him from a helicopter using a grenade launcher. Darkman manages to defeat his archenemy by clinging to the helicopter and using his strength to pull it into a tunnel and explode the chopper. Darkman gratifyingly yells, "Burn in Hell!"

After this, Darkman poses as Durant in order to infiltrate Strack's new skyscraper, which was the reason the developer hired Durant in the first place. Strack suspects Darkman will come after him and takes Julie hostage. Strack suggests they join forces but when he refuses they battle atop the skyscraper. Darkman has the chance to spare his life but instead throws Strack to his death. Believing he has become too much of a monster to be with Julie, he abandons her, vowing to become a vigilante and bringer of justice.

After two and a half years of crimefighting, Darkman is shocked to discover that Durant is alive and that he must again battle his arch-enemy. He also wishes to avenge a scientist named Brinkman, whom he had been partnering with in order to perfect his synthetic skin so he may lead a normal life. After defeating Durant, Darkman found a new enemy in drug lord Peter Rooker who proved to be his most powerful adversary after going through a process that makes his strength equal to Darkman's. Darkman managed to bring down Rooker by posing as him but felt conflicted as he fell in love with Rooker's wife and young daughter, whom he had to abandon as well to resume his life as a vigilante. Beforehand, however, he finally manages to perfect his synthetic skin but uses the only sample to heal Rooker's daughter.

== Powers and abilities ==
Due to clinical experiments, the nerve endings connected to Darkman's skin have been severed, rendering him immune to pain, but unable to feel physical sensations. Additionally, to compensate for his loss of physical feelings, adrenaline flows unchecked through Darkman's body, enhancing his physical strength, speed, agility, reflexes, stamina, and durability.

Using his synthetic skin, Darkman is able to pose as criminals, imitate their voices, and trick them into engineering their own downfall. He's also a skilled hand-to-hand combatant, and an expert in the fields of science with a genius-level intellect.

== Personality ==
Darkman possesses similar ethics to those of a superhero, such as not harming the innocent, but has the tenacity and impulsiveness of a psychopath as demonstrated when he revels in the suffering of criminals. He also has a dangerous temper, as seen in Darkman when he (disguised as his former self) breaks the fingers of an obnoxious carnival worker for refusing to give Julie Hastings the prized elephant. When Julie refuses the prize, he remarks, furiously, "Take the fucking elephant!" When a cat hisses at him, he is enraged and argues with the cat, and accuses it of thinking he is a "freak of nature". Despite his temper and preference for violence, Darkman also has a morbid sense of humor in sticky situations. For example, Darkman breaks into a business meeting while attached to Durant's chopper. He remarks to the businessman, "Excuse me!" before being pulled off again, and when Strack begs for mercy, stating murder will haunt his conscience. Darkman, after only some hesitation, drops him to his death and remarks, "I'm learning to live with a lot of things".

== Appearances ==
=== Films ===
==== Darkman ====
This film documents Darkman's origins and his relationship with Julie, and systematically showing his transformation into a vengeful criminal killer and his first battle with Durant and the businessman Strack.

==== Darkman II: The Return of Durant ====
Durant survives his ordeal from the first film and plans to take over the city using futuristic weaponry. Only Darkman can stop his archenemy and avenge one of Durant's latest victims.

==== Darkman III: Die Darkman Die ====
Drug lord Peter Rooker allies with a scientist who also worked on Darkman's superhuman strength and invulnerability. He invents a steroid that gives test subjects superhuman strength, but leaves them mentally unstable. Darkman then poses as Rooker to foil his plan, but ends up having to save the villain's family.

=== Novels ===
At the time of the first film's release, Jove Books published a novelisation written by Randall Boyll. In 1994, Boyll wrote four new novels (The Hangman, The Price of Fear, The Gods of Hell, and In the Face of Death) which continue Darkman's story and expand his character and background.

=== Comics ===
At the time of the film's release in 1990, Marvel Comics published a three issue comic book adaption. In 1993, Marvel also published a six issue miniseries about the character. In 2006, Dynamite Entertainment published a crossover comic where Darkman teams up with another Sam Raimi creation Ash Williams.

In 2006, Dynamite Entertainment published a crossover comic where Darkman teams up with another Sam Raimi creation Ash Williams.

=== Unaired television pilot ===
The character also appears in an unaired TV pilot played by Christopher Bowen, with a similar origin to the movie version with some alterations. In this version while Robert G. Durant (Larry Drake reprising his role) retains his role in causing the explosion that turned Peyton into Darkman, Julie is also killed in the explosion. Darkman then seeks vengeance on Durant and eventually kills him.

=== Video games ===
Darkman was developed by Ocean Software (Painting By Numbers on the NES version, Twilight on the Commodore 64 and ZX Spectrum versions) and published by Ocean Software in 1991. It was released for the Amiga, ZX Spectrum, Amstrad CPC, Commodore 64 and Atari ST. It also had two different games of the same name for the Nintendo Entertainment System and Game Boy. The game's plot is loosely based on the film of the same name.
