= Maeve Dermody =

Australian actress

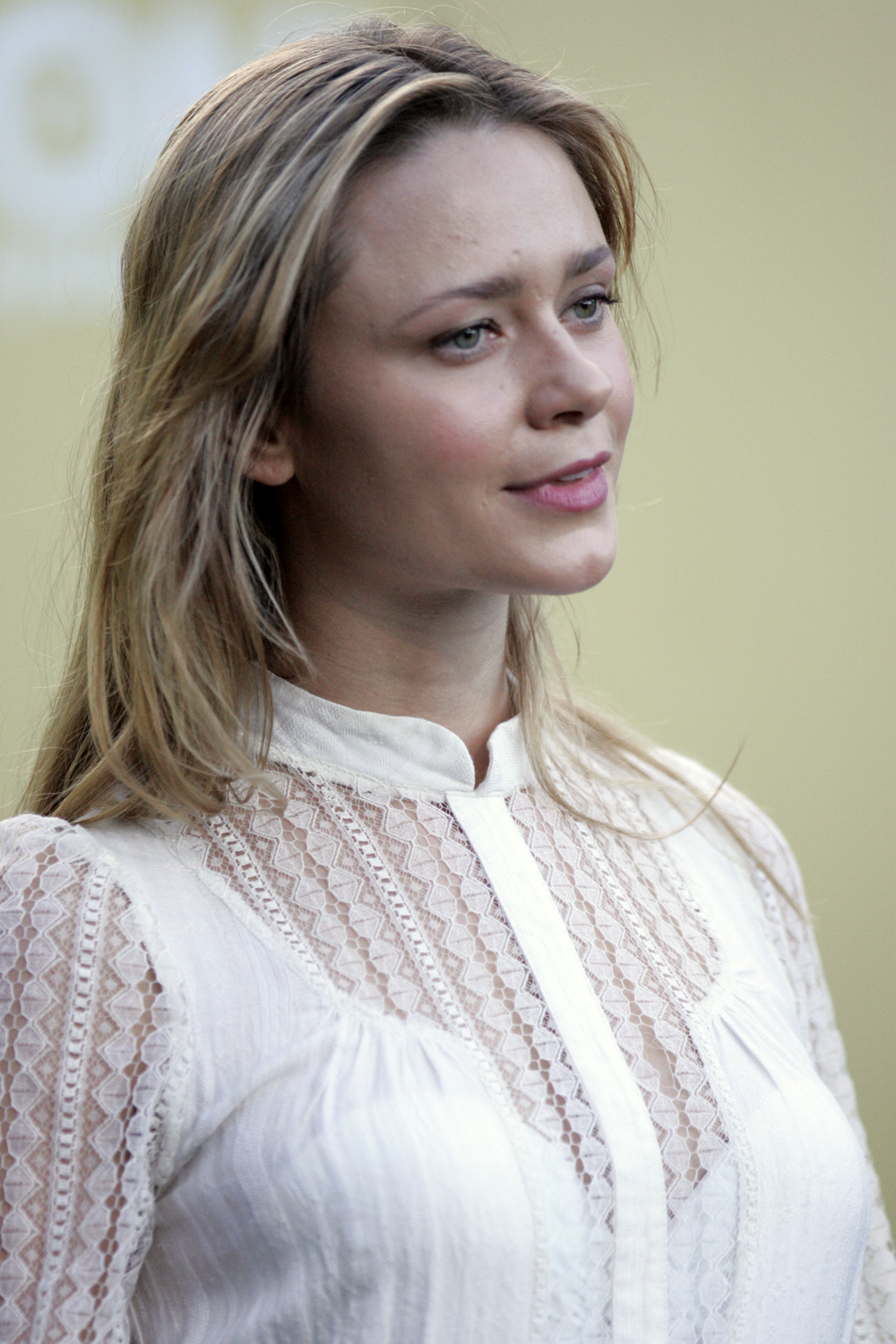
- Born: Australia
- Occupation: Actress
- Years active: 1991–present
- Known for: Black Water (2007)

Maeve Dermody (/meɪv ˈdɜːrmədi/ mayv DUR-mə-dee) is an Australian actress. After a film appearance at five years old, her adult acting career has included work in Australian and British television, theatre, short films, and feature films.

== Early life and education ==
Maeve Dermody is the daughter of Susan Murphy Dermody, a film theorist, historian, director, and Zen Rōshi. Her father is a psychologist. Dermody's family encouraged a love of literature and the arts, and supported performing as well - her mother gave Dermody her first part when she was five years old in the film her mother directed Breathing Under Water, released in 1993.

Dermody attended Mosman High School in Sydney, completing year 12 with a near-perfect Universities Admission Index. During high school she was active in drama classes, as well as the Australian Theatre for Young People, and furthered her acting education with several courses at the National Institute of Dramatic Art in Sydney.

== Career ==
While still in high school, Dermody began getting roles in Australian television series such as All Saints (1998), and in short films. Her first major film role was in the independent thriller Black Water (2007), about a trio of people trapped in the mangroves of the Northern Territory by a menacing saltwater crocodile. Dermody's performance in Black Water earned her multiple nominations for Best Supporting Actress awards in the Australian film industry. Her next major film role was in Beautiful Kate (2009), for which she was again nominated for the AFI Best Supporting Actress Award.

She had a lead role in the 2010 film Griff the Invisible, and in the 2012 miniseries Bikie Wars: Brothers in Arms.

In 2013, Dermody starred as Claire Simpson in the 10-part Australian-Singaporean TV drama series Serangoon Road.

Dermody is also active in the Australian theatre, having appeared in productions such as Killer Joe, Measure for Measure, Our Town, and The Seagull, for major theatre companies in Sydney.

At Christmas 2015, Dermody starred as Vera Claythorne in BBC One's version of Agatha Christie's thriller And Then There Were None.

In 2016 she played the lead role as Kate in Pawno.

She plays the lead role as Sarah, a woman escaping domestic violence with her teenage son, in the 2026 film Life Could Be a Dream.

== Filmography ==
=== Film ===
Year	Title	Role	Notes
1992	Breathing Under Water	Maeve	
2003	All Shook Up	Billy	Short
2006	A Fairytale of the City	The Girl	Short
2007	Walnut	Ghyselle	Short
2007	Black Water	Lee	
2009	Shot Open	Amelia Walsh	Short
2009	Past Midnight	Ginny	Short
2009	Beautiful Kate	Toni	
2009	At the Breakfast Table		Short
2010	Griff the Invisible	Melody	
2010	Magpie	Martha	Short
2012	Dangerous Remedy	Jo Wainer	TV film
2012	Almost	Emily	Short
2013	Greg's First Day	Mandy	Short
2014	Wedding of the Year		
2015	The Fear of Darkness	Dr. Sarah Faithfull	
2016	Pawno	Kate	
2016	The Space Between	Olivia	
2017	2:22	Sandy	
2018	Birdie		Short
2019	Love Type D	Frankie	
2020	The Secret Garden	Alice	
2020	The Immortal	Lucy	Short
2026	Life Could Be a Dream	Sarah	

=== Television ===
Year	Title	Role	Notes
2003	White Collar Blue	Amanda Payne	1 episode
2006	All Saints	Taylor Patterson	Episode: "Truth Hurts"
2006	Monarch Cove	Charlotte Lee	Miniseries, 1 episode
2007	The Chaser's War on Everything		1 episode
2009	My Place	Evelyn	Episode: "1918 Bertie"
2011	Paper Giants: The Birth of Cleo	Rachel Carr	Miniseries
2012	Miss Fisher's Murder Mysteries	Eunice Henderson	Episode: "Murder on the Ballarat Train"
2012	Bikie Wars: Brothers in Arms	Lee	Miniseries, series regular
2012	Rake	Polly Nesbitt	2 episodes
2012	Dangerous Remedy	Joanne Bertram	Telemovie
2013	Power Games: The Packer-Murdoch War	Anna Murdoch	Miniseries
2013	Serangoon Road	Claire Simpson	Series regular
2015	And Then There Were None	Vera Elizabeth Claythorne	Miniseries
2016	Ripper Street	Prudence Sumner	Episode: "All the Glittering Blades"
2016-2018	Marcella	Grace Gibson	4 episodes
2017	SS-GB	Sylvia Manning	Miniseries
2017	The Frankenstein Chronicles	Esther Rose	Season 2, series regular
2019	Carnival Row	Portia Fyfe	Season 1, series regular
2019	Gold Digger	Emily	Miniseries, episode: "Her Daughter"
2020-2021	The Beast Must Die	Violet	Series regular
2022	Why Didn't They Ask Evans?	Moira Nicholson	Miniseries, 3 episodes
2025	A Thousand Blows	Lady Grace	

=== Music videos ===
Year	Title	Artist	Role
2009	"Warning"	Incubus	Lead Girl

=== Theatre ===
Year	Play	Role	Venue / Company
2004	Vincent in Brixton	Eugenie Loyer	Ensemble Theatre, Sydney
2005	The Girl on the Sofa	The Girl	New Theatre, Sydney
2006	The Peach Season	Zoe	Griffin Theatre Company, Sydney
2008	Killer Joe	Dottie	Downstairs Theatre, Sydney
2010	Measure for Measure	Juliet	Belvoir St Theatre, Sydney with Company B
2010	Our Town	Emily Webb	Sydney Opera House with Sydney Theatre Company
2011	The Seagull	Nina Mikhailovna Zarechniy	Belvoir St Theatre Sydney with Company B

== Awards and nominations ==
Year	Award	Category	Work	Result
2008	AFI Awards	Best Actress in a Supporting Role	Black Water	Nominated
2008	IF Awards	Best Actress	Black Water	Nominated
2008	YEN Magazine	Young Woman of the Year: Film, Television and Theatre	—N/a	Won
2009	Film Critics Circle of Australia Awards	Best Supporting Actress	Black Water	Nominated
2009	AFI Awards	Best Actress in a Supporting Role	Beautiful Kate	Nominated
2010	Film Critics Circle of Australia Awards	Best Supporting Actress	Beautiful Kate	Nominated
2010	FBi Radio Sydney Music, Arts & Culture Awards	Best Performer	Our Town	Nominated
2011	News Limited	Star of the Year	—N/a	Won
2015	FilmQuest Cthulhu Trophy	Best Actress	Pawno	Nominated
2016	AACTA Awards	Best Actress in a Leading Role	Pawno	Nominated
2017	Film Critics Circle of Australia Awards	Best Actress	Pawno	Nominated
2021	Micheaux Film Festival	Outstanding Actress in Feature Film	Love Type D	Nominated
