= Breathing Under Water (film) =

- Directed by: Susan Dermody
- Written by: Susan Dermody
- Produced by: Megan McMurchy
- Starring: Anne Louise Lambert; Maeve Dermody; David Argue
- Release date: 1991
- Country: Australia
- Language: English
- Box office: A$17,200

Breathing Under Water is an Australian film, the first feature from director and writer Susan Dermody.

== Plot ==
Dermody's Breathing Under Water is the tale of a main character named Beatrice who travels to a mythical city deep in the ocean.

== Cast ==
- Anne Louise Lambert as Beatrice
- Maeve Dermody as Maeve
- Gillian Jones
- David Argue as Bus Conductor
