= Cousin Phillis (TV series) =

British television series

- Genre: Drama
- Based on: Cousin Phillis by Elizabeth Gaskell
- Written by: Mike Healey
- Directed by: Mike Healey
- Starring: Anne-Louise Lambert; Tim Woodward; Ian Bannen
- Country of origin: United Kingdom
- Original language: English
- No. of series: 1
- No. of episodes: 4

Production
- Producer: Ray Colley
- Running time: 30 minutes
- Production company: BBC

Original release
- Network: BBC One
- Release: 5 September – 26 September 1982

Cousin Phillis is a British four-part television series that was originally broadcast on BBC One in 1982. It is an adaptation of the 1864 novel of the same title by Elizabeth Gaskell. A wedding scene was filmed on location at the Baptist Chapel, Great Warford.

== Cast ==
- Anne-Louise Lambert as Phillis Holman
- Dominic Guard as Paul Manning
- Tim Woodward as Edward Holdsworth
- Ian Bannen as Reverend Ebenezer Holman
- Georgine Anderson as Margaret Holman
- Daphne Oxenford as Bessie Norton

== Bibliography ==
- Baskin, Ellen . Serials on British Television, 1950-1994. Scolar Press, 1996.
