= Darkman III: Die Darkman Die =

1996 film by Bradford May

- Promotional release poster
- Directed by: Bradford May
- Written by: Michael Colleary; Mike Werb
- Based on: Characters by Sam Raimi
- Produced by: David Roessell
- Starring: Arnold Vosloo; Jeff Fahey; Darlanne Fluegel; Roxann Dawson
- Cinematography: Bradford May
- Edited by: Daniel Cahn
- Music by: Randy Miller
- Production company: Renaissance Pictures
- Distributed by: MCA Universal Home Video
- Release date: August 20, 1996 (United States)
- Running time: 87 minutes
- Countries: United States; Canada
- Language: English

Darkman III: Die Darkman Die is a 1996 Canadian-American superhero film directed by Bradford May, starring Arnold Vosloo, Jeff Fahey, Darlanne Fluegel and Roxann Dawson. It is the sequel to 1995's Darkman II: The Return of Durant, whose director Sam Raimi serves as executive producer. Vosloo once again stars as Darkman, who stands against power-hungry entrepreneur Peter Rooker (Fahey), and forges a strange emotional bond with his enemy's neglected wife and daughter.

== Plot ==
Scientist Peyton Westlake is still searching for the key to creating a permanent liquid-skin formula to mend his burned face and body, and continues to operate as the vigilante "Darkman." He interrupts a criminal exchange spearheaded by power-hungry businessman and crime boss Peter Rooker, who becomes fascinated by Westlake's superhuman strength and agility. Westlake is later approached by Dr. Bridget Thorne, one of the physicians who saved his life after the brutal attack that scarred him years earlier. She offers to help him complete his liquid-skin formula, while also theorizing she can surgically repair his nervous system, restoring some of the sensory loss he has experienced since the attack.

They travel to a laboratory Thorne has set up in an abandoned industrial complex, where she completes the surgery, seemingly restoring Westlake's ability to perceive sensation. Using her cutting-edge equipment, Westlake manages to create a small amount of permanent liquid skin, which does not break down in sunlight as his other samples have.

However, Rooker suddenly arrives and reveals that Thorne is his mistress. Rooker explains that he desires the enhanced strength that Westlake has at his disposal. The two plan to use Westlake as a guinea pig to try and replicate the perpetual adrenal overload that gives him his power. Thorn also reveals that she implanted an electrical shock-device into the back of his neck to control him. They steal Westlake's skin sample and a computer disk containing his research, and put him through a series of strenuous physical tests. Westlake later finds a pair of pliers and manages to rip the shock-device from his neck before escaping.

Westlake, trying to learn more about Rooker, encounters his neglected wife Angela and their young daughter, Jenny. At first concerned, he eventually develops feelings for the two upon realizing how lonely and empty his life is. He uses his liquid skin to assume Rooker's identity and pours his energy into being a loving father and husband, including seeing Jenny perform in her school's production of Beauty and the Beast.

Rooker uses the data from Westlake's tests to create a super-strength formula. He gives it to his men, and orders them to assassinate an idealistic district attorney at a public gathering. Westlake arrives in the nick of time and is able to stop the assassination attempt. Rooker next learns that Westlake had stolen his identity to spend time with his family. He murders Thorne and psychopathically declares his intention to be a better husband and father to a horrified Angela. Rooker takes his family back to Thorne's lab, holding them hostage.

Westlake follows them. Upon arrival, he learns that Rooker has injected himself with the last of the super-strength formula, which has not only increased his physical strength, but also seemingly amplified his insanity. The two engage in a brutal brawl throughout the building. Westlake manages to reclaim the sample of permanent liquid skin during the fight, but his research disk is destroyed. He finally gets the upper hand and is able to trick Rooker into falling into an industrial shredding machine, killing him.

A gas-line in the building catches fire, causing a massive explosion; Westlake is able to save Angela and Jenny, but Jenny's face is terribly burned. Westlake decides to use the liquid skin to repair Jenny's face rather than his own. After Angela thanks Westlake for saving her daughter, he leaves them, vowing to continue his work on the formula while fighting crime and injustice.

== Cast ==
- Arnold Vosloo as Dr. Peyton Westlake / Darkman
- Jeff Fahey as Peter Rooker
- Darlanne Fluegel as Dr. Bridget Thorne
- Roxann Dawson as Angela Rooker
- Nigel Bennett as Nico
- John Novak as District Attorney Ryan Mitchell
- Shawn Doyle as Adam
- Joel Bissonnette as Mayo
- Ronn Sarosiak as Mack
- Peter Graham as Joey
- Vieslav Krystyan as Ivan
- Chris Adams as Whit
- Rick Parker as E.K.
- Alicia Panetta as Jenny Rooker
- Christopher Bondy as Gibson
- Von Flores as Johnny Lee
- Walker Boone as Sergeant Troy. This marked Boone's final live-action film role before his death in 2021.
- Eric Hollo as Paul Raney
- Bob Windsor as Uncle Owen
- Lorne Cossette as Dr. Leonard
- Diana Platts as Herself

== Production ==
=== Development and writing ===
Darkman III: Die Darkman Die is the sister picture to its predecessor, Darkman II: The Return of Durant. Both films were greenlit together by Universal Pictures in 1992, and developed alongside one another.

Darkman III was written by Michael Colleary and Mike Werb. The pair was concurrently polishing their spec script Face/Off, which was pitched before the Darkman sequels, but went through a protracted development across two studios, and ended up being filmed after them. Some narrative elements, such as a character taking his arch enemy's facial features and becoming close to the latter's unsuspecting family, are common to both Darkman III and Face/Off. Dark Horse Comics' Mark Verheiden, author of Timecop and its Raimi-produced film adaptation, performed some uncredited rewrites on Darkman III. Verheiden was also the original writer for the Dark Horse adaptation The Mask, to which Werb contributed major script revisions. It is unknown whether the involvement of both men on those two projects is coincidental.

Due to Larry Drake's prior commitments, the sequel he appeared in was scheduled to be shot last, and it was initially assumed that this would be its release order as well. For this reason, Darkman III was known as Darkman II during production. However, in a March 1995 interview, actress Roxann Dawson said she was unsure of the film's final title. It was eventually decided to switch the releases around and alter their numbers accordingly, which led to some minor inconsistencies in the now renamed Darkman III, as research concerning synthetic skin is less advanced than in its purported prequel.

=== Filming ===
Like The Return of Durant, Die Darkman Die was shot in Toronto, Ontario, and used much of the same crew. Principal photography started on November 15, 1993, and concluded on December 20. The crew then took a break before the shooting of the other instalment. The aggregate budget for both films was slightly less than US$7 million, with Darkman II: The Return of Durant taking up the better part of that amount at US$4 million.

May prioritized key set pieces to make the most of the film's modest means. According to the director, the final factory explosion in Die Darkman Die was the largest in Canadian film history up to that point. However, Verheiden also remembers that a relatively simple scene he had written, where an enraged Darkman bashed a thug's head into the hood of a car, was nixed as the required props and stuntpersons were too expensive.

== Release ==
=== Home media ===
Darkman III: Die Darkman Die was released on VHS tape on August 20, 1996. As per industry standards, the Laserdisc followed one week later on August 27.

Die Darkman Die was re-issued on DVD by Universal on January 5, 2004, in the U.S., as part of the budget priced "Universal Studio Selections" collection. It was devoid of features other than a chapter selection. An international pressing predates the domestic version. Listed with a release date of October 23, 2000 in the U.K., it included a brief biography of lead actor Arnold Vosloo.

Shout! Factory released a Blu-ray of the film on November 7, 2017. It includes a new feature-length audio commentary from director Bradford May and a trailer.

=== Television ===
Like its predecessor, Darkman III received a primetime network TV showing on Fox on July 7, 1999, almost one year after Part II, and with similar results. It garnered a 2.7 rating and a 6 share.

== Reception ==
On review aggregator website Rotten Tomatoes, the film holds a 39% approval rating based on 18 reviews

Jeff Fahey's dual performance as Darkman and Rooker was widely praised. Ian Jane of DVDTalk called the actor "fun as the crazed bad guy", while TV Guide commended him "for creating a new nemesis for Darkman who is not simply a retread of the first two films' sinister Durant".

The film's production values received mixed to poor reviews. TV Guide said "The production boasts impressive visuals in the form of blue screen pyrotechnics and various makeup effects. It is clear that Darkman III is not a mere cash-in on the original's popularity". Ballantine Books's DVD and Video Guide was less impressed, commenting that it had to make do "without the outrageous stunts and hyperkinetic visuals that made the first film so memorable." Richard Scheib of Moria Reviews thought that "the low budget shows through at times".

Alan Jones of the BBC's RadioTimes praised "a well-realised script accenting character as much as explosive gimmicks". Scheib wrote that "where Die Darkman Die does work is in the central character conflict it sets up. The story twists about on a unique dilemma—that of Darkman wearing a mobster’s face as a disguise but in so doing coming to provide the care and attention the mobster never gave his wife and child". Hock Teh of IGN also noted that "Darkman III surprised me in a good way by harking back to our hero's emotional state of mind so evident in the first movie." Jane, however, disagreed with the new direction, saying "[w]hile it's interesting to see how the story deals with Darkman's emotional turmoil by throwing Rooker's wife and child into the mix, the story this time around is pretty convoluted. Peter M. Nichols of The New York Times also found that "[b]y contrast [with The Return of Durant], the second sequel, Darkman III: Die Darkman Die, takes a campy approach to a story that seems to be tiring."

== Possible sequel ==
While Darkman II and III were made after Fox passed on a regular TV show based on the character, a May 1995 report by Variety indicated that Universal still considered them as backdoor pilots for a potential series. According to Larry Drake, Raimi also told him that a story was in place for a fourth feature that would see Durant return once more, should the first two sequels be successful. Vosloo stated that he would consider reprising his role, but remained on the fence due to the toll taken on him by extended make-up sessions. After the films, the actor vowed not to take on such effects-intensive work again. He later mollified his stance to appear in The Mummy, although much of that was CGI.

In a May 2022 interview, Raimi acknowledged that Universal was considering a new Darkman film; he also named a producer to oversee the project. His comment pertained to a question about a legacy sequel, suggesting a partial reboot that would ignore the direct-to-video instalments.
