= Christopher Bowen =

British actor

- Born: 20 October 1959 (age 67)
- Occupation: Actor

Christopher Bowen (born 20 October 1959) is a British actor.

Bowen was educated at the Cathedral School, Llandaff, Radley College, and Magdalene College, Cambridge University. He trained at the Old Vic Theatre School in Bristol and spent three years with the RSC in the 1980s. Other theatre credits include the title role in "Macbeth" at the Southwark Playhouse, Laertes in "Hamlet" at the Young Vic, Veit Kunz in "Franziska" at the Gate Theatre, Oberon in "A Midsummer Night's Dream" for the City of London Festival, Maecenas in "Antony and Cleopatra" at the Haymarket Theatre.

His television credits include: Mr Briggs in "Jane Eyre" for the BBC, Alastair Campbell in "Why We Went to War" for C4, Ant Johnson in "Holby City", Richard Carey in "Murder in Mesopotamia" (Poirot), Dempsey and Makepeace, Knights of God, John Dexter in Tanamera – Lion of Singapore, Mordred in the Doctor Who serial "Battlefield", Little Lord Fauntleroy, Waiting for God, Castles, Peak Practice, Heartbeat, Doctors, Rosemary & Thyme and the title role in an unaired pilot of Darkman.

His film credits include: Commander Day in the James Bond film Tomorrow Never Dies, Charles Fairford in Cold Comfort Farm directed by John Schlesinger, the Prince of Wales in Richard III, Hamilton in Gaudi Afternoon directed by Susan Seidelman.

== Filmography ==
=== Film ===
Year	Title	Role	Notes
1995	Richard III	Prince Edward	Feature film
1995	Cold Comfort Farm	Charles Fairford	Originally a TV Movie, but then theatrically released
1997	Tomorrow Never Dies	Cmdr. Richard Day (HMS Devonshire)	Feature film
2001	Gaudi Afternoon	Hamilton	Feature film
2003	Monsieur N.	Col. Bingham	Feature film
2016	Maigret Sets a Trap	Inspector Lefors	TV movie
2017	On Chesil Beach	Cricket Captain	Feature film

=== Television ===
Year	Title	Role	Notes
1987	Knights of God	Helicopter Pilot	7 episodes
1989	Tanamera – Lion of Singapore	John Dexter	7 episodes
1989	Doctor Who	Mordred	4 episodes
1995	Castles	Alex Milburn	24 episodes
