= Cousin Phillis =

1863–1864 novella by Elizabeth Gaskell

Cousin Phillis is a novella published between 1863 and 1864 by Elizabeth Gaskell. It was first published in four parts in The Cornhill Magazine, though a fifth and sixth part were planned. Later it was published in book form, including an edition in 1908 with illustrations by Mary Wheelhouse. The story is about 19-year-old Paul Manning, (Note: Paul is seventeen at the beginning of the story, but he turns nineteen before meeting his cousin Phillis.) who moves to the country and befriends his mother's family and his (second) cousin Phillis Holman, who is confused by her own placement at the edge of adolescence.

Most critics agree that Cousin Phillis is Gaskell's crowning achievement in the short novel. The story is uncomplicated; its virtues are in the manner of its development and telling. Cousin Phillis is also recognized as a fitting prelude for Gaskell's final and most widely acclaimed novel, Wives and Daughters, which ran in Cornhill Magazine from August 1864 to January 1866.

In 1982 a BBC television adaptation Cousin Phillis starring Anne-Louise Lambert, Tim Woodward and Ian Bannen.

== Characters ==
- Paul Manning (the narrator, Phillis's cousin)
- Mr Manning (Paul's father and inventor)
- Mr Edward Holdsworth (railway engineer)
- Mr Holman (independent church minister and farmer)
- Mrs Holman
- Miss Phillis Holman
- Mr Ellison (Mr Manning's business partner)
- Miss Lucille Ventadur (at last Mr Holdsworth's wife)
- Betty (the servant at Holman house)

== Style ==
Cousin Phillis resists categorisation to a certain extent, being situated between a short story and a novel. This was a rare form in Victorian fiction, but one favoured by Gaskell. The piece is a presented in a remembered form mimicking an anecdote. Set in the 1840s, it deals with themes of social change in an isolated rural community that is reflected other works such as Cranford or North and South.
