= Tanamera – Lion of Singapore =

British–Australian television miniseries

- Genre: Drama
- Written by: Peter Gibbs
- Directed by: John Power; Kevin Dobson
- Starring: Christopher Bowen
- Country of origin: Australia
- Original language: English

Production
- Producers: Jan Badlier; David Lee
- Running time: 7 x 1 hour

Original release
- Release: 18 February 1989 – 1989

Tanamera – Lion of Singapore was a 1989 Australian drama serial which was a co-production between Central Independent television and Grundy in 1989.

== Plot ==
The lives of two leading families of Singapore, the Dexters and the Soongs, become intertwined when John Dexter falls in love with Julie Soong. Action takes place between 1935 and 1948.

The series is based on the novel Tanamera by Noel Barber. "Tanamera" is the name of the house built by Grandpa Jack, the patriarch of the Dexter family; it is derived from Tanah Merah, Malay for "Red Earth". The grounds of the huge Tanamera bungalow consisted largely of red soil.

== Cast ==
- Christopher Bowen as John Dexter
- Khym Lam as Julie Soong
- Anthony Calf as Tim Dexter
- Gary Sweet as Tony
- John Jarratt as Neil Forbes
- Anne-Louise Lambert as Irene
- Penne Hackforth-Jones as Mama Jack
- Ed Devereaux as Grandpa Jack
- Tushka Bergen as Natasha
- Lewis Fiander as Papa Jack
- Bruce Spence as Hammond
- Bryan Marshall as Chalfont
- Betty Lucas as Lady Bradshaw
- Wallas Eaton as Shelton Thomas
- Darren Yap as Paul
- Robert Coleby as Bonnard
- Anthony Wong as Miki
- Ned Manning as Ray
- Terry McDermott as Fire Chief

== Broadcast ==
The series was first shown in the United Kingdom, and from April 1989, Albania, Finland, New Zealand and America as well.
