= Great Expectations: The Untold Story =

- Genre: Period drama
- Based on: Great Expectations by Charles Dickens
- Written by: Tim Burstall
- Story by: Tom Burstall
- Directed by: Tim Burstall
- Starring: John Stanton; Sigrid Thornton; Robert Coleby; Anne-Louise Lambert; Ron Haddrick; Noel Ferrier; Danny Simmons; Todd Boyce
- Music by: George Dreyfus
- Country of origin: Australia
- Original language: English
- No. of episodes: 6

Production
- Executive producers: Antony I. Ginnane; Ray Alchin
- Producers: Tom Burstall; Ray Alchin
- Production location: Sydney
- Cinematography: Peter Hendry
- Editors: Tony Kavanaugh; Lyn Solly
- Running time: 50 minutes 102 minutes (film version)
- Production companies: Hemdale Film Corporation; Australian Broadcasting Corporation; International Film Management
- Budget: A$5,970,077

Original release
- Network: ABC
- Release: 7 February – 14 March 1987

Great Expectations: The Untold Story is a 1987 Australian period drama miniseries, which was later re-edited as a feature film.

It is based on an account of what happened to Magwitch from Charles Dickens' 1861 novel Great Expectations when he was in Australia.

== Plot ==
Magwitch is sentenced to life in New South Wales. He is put on a chain gang run by Solomon Tooth and eventually amasses a fortune.

== Cast ==
- John Stanton as Magwitch
- Sigrid Thornton as Bridget
- Robert Coleby as Compeyson
- Anne Louise Lambert as Estella
- Noel Ferrier as Jaggers
- Ron Haddrick as Lankerton
- Danny Simmons as Young Pip
- Todd Boyce as Older Pip
- Serge Lazareff as Courtney
- Annie Byron as Mrs. Joe Gargery
- Bruce Spence as Joe Gargery
- Brian Moll as Uncle Pumblechook
- Les Foxcroft as Gaoler
- Richard Morgan as Pryce

== Production ==
The project was the idea of Tom Burstall, who made it with his director father Tim. Tim Burstall says in the writing of it he was influenced by a book by Price Waring, Tales of the Old Convict System. It was filmed in Sydney from 9 March to 11 July 1986.
