= Larry Drake =

American actor (1949–2016)

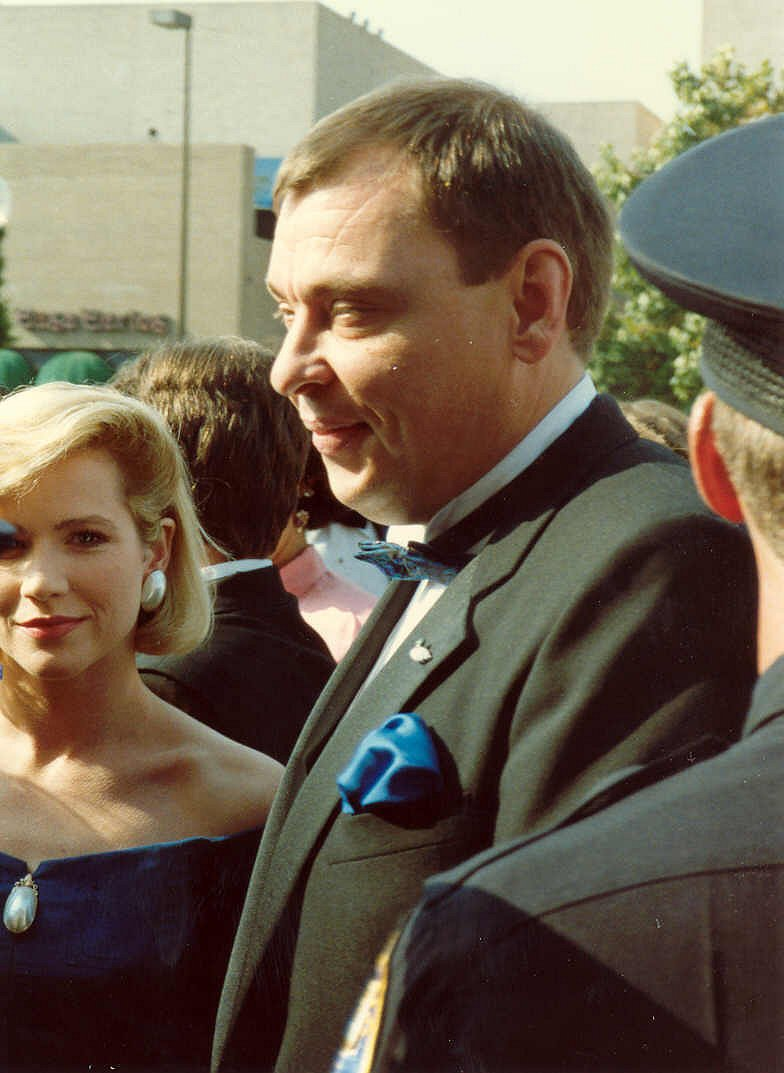
- Drake on the red carpet at the 40th Annual Primetime Emmy Awards, August 28, 1988.
- Born: Larry Richard Drake; February 21, 1950; Tulsa, Oklahoma, U.S.
- Died: March 17, 2016 (aged 66); Hollywood, California, U.S.
- Resting place: Hollywood Forever Cemetery
- Education: University of Oklahoma
- Occupations: Actor; acting teacher; playwright
- Years active: 1971–2016
- Spouse: Ruth de Sosa (m. 1989; div. 1991)
- Awards: Emmy Award, 1988-1989

Lawrence Richard Drake (February 21, 1950 – March 17, 2016) was an American actor. He was best known for his role as Benny Stulwicz in L.A. Law, for which he won two Primetime Emmy Awards. He also appeared as Robert G. Durant in both Darkman and Darkman II: The Return of Durant, a homicidal mental patient who escapes an insane asylum in the slasher black comedy Dr. Giggles, and was the voice of Pops in Johnny Bravo.

== Early life ==
Larry Richard Drake was born in Tulsa, Oklahoma, on February 21, 1950, the son of Raymond John Drake, a drafting engineer for an oil company, and Lorraine Ruth (née Burns), a homemaker. He graduated from Tulsa Edison High School and the University of Oklahoma.

== Career ==
Drake is mostly remembered for his portrayal of developmentally disabled Benny Stulwicz in L.A. Law, from 1987 until the show's end in 1994, for which he twice won the Primetime Emmy Award for Outstanding Supporting Actor in a Drama Series. in 1988 and 1989. He returned to the role of Benny in the 2002 reunion film L.A. Law: The Movie.

He appeared in numerous film and television roles, including Time Quest, Dark Asylum, Paranoid, Bean, Overnight Delivery, The Beast, The Journey of August King, Murder in New Hampshire, Dr. Giggles, Darkman, Darkman II: The Return of Durant, The Taming of the Shrew, American Pie 2, and Dark Night of the Scarecrow. He was a regular on Prey. Drake provided the voice of Pops in Johnny Bravo. In 2007, he co-starred in Gryphon, a Sci-Fi Pictures original film.

Drake also performed frequently on stage at theaters including South Coast Repertory, Old Globe Theatre, Los Angeles Theatre Center, and the Dallas Theater Center, with more than 100 roles over the course of his career.

He also wrote plays, including the comedies Whodunnit, Darling? and Double Entendre, both co-written with Charles Edward Pogue.

Drake was a longtime student of acting teacher and coach Stephen Book and his Improvisation Technique, the application of improvisation to scripted acting. In 2003, Drake became Book's assistant at the Stephen Book Acting Workshop in Hollywood and in 2006 began teaching his own classes there as well. He continued teaching at the workshop until his death.

== Personal life ==
Drake was married from 1989 to 1991 to Ruth de Sosa, an actress and producer known for her roles in The Young Indiana Jones Chronicles and Planes, Trains and Automobiles.

== Death ==
On March 17, 2016, Drake was found dead in his Los Angeles home at the age of 67. Drake's manager, Steven Siebert, reported that he had some health problems in the months before his death. It was later reported that Drake had a rare form of blood cancer that caused his blood to thicken.

== Filmography ==
=== Film ===
Year	Title	Role	Notes
1971	This Stuff'll Kill Ya!	Bubba	
1975	Trucker's Woman	Joe 'Diesel Joe'	
1976	The Electric Chair	Courtroom Observer	Uncredited
1976	Date with a Kidnapper	Age Home Attendant	
1978	The Seniors	Bus Sign Installer	Uncredited
1980	The Big Brawl	Judge #1	
1981	The White Lions	Fiske	
1981	Dark Night of the Scarecrow	Bubba Ritter	Television film
1983	The Taming of the Shrew	Baptista	Short
1984	The Karate Kid	Yahoo #1 At Beach	
1986	The Ladies Club	Cop #2	
1988	For Keeps	Night Clerk	
1988	Too Good to Be True	Glen Robie	Television film
1989	Oh, Henry!	Henry	Television film
1990	Darkman	Robert G. Durant	Nominated – Saturn Award for Best Supporting Actor
1991	Murder in New Hampshire: The Pamela Wojas Smart Story	Mark Sisti	Television film
1992	Dr. Giggles	Dr. Evan Rendell Jr. / Dr. Giggles	
1992	Blind Geronimo and His Brother	Unknown	
1994	One More Mountain	Patrick Breen	Television film
1995	Darkman II: The Return of Durant	Robert G. Durant	Direct-to-video
1995	The Journey of August King	Olaf Singletary	
1996	The Beast	Lucas Coven	Television film
1997	Bean	Elmer	
1998	Overnight Delivery	Hal Ipswich	
1998	Paranoia	Calvin Hawks	
1998	The Treat	Ray	
1999	Inferno	Ramsey Hogan	
1999	Durango Kids	Dudley	
2000	Runaway Virus	Dr. Griggs	Television film
2000	Time of Her Time	Dr. Joyce	
2000	Timequest	J. Edgar Hoover	
2001	American Pie 2	Natalie's Dad	
2001	Dark Asylum	'The Trasher'	
2002	L.A. Law: The Movie	Benny Stulwicz	Television film
2002	Spun	Dr. K.	
2005	Jenny Says	Dr. Weinhouse	Short
2005	I Will Avenge You, Iago!	The Warden	
2005	Officer Down	Captain Raymond Taggart	Television film
2005	Mrs. Harris	Harris, Defense Team Psychiatrist	Television film
2006	Living the Dream	Richard	
2006	Love Hollywood Style	Walter	
2006	National Lampoon's Dorm Daze 2	Dean Dryer	
2007	Gryphon	Armand The Sorcerer	
2008	Pathology	'Fat Bastard'	
2009	Green Lantern: First Flight	Ganthet	Voice, direct-to-video
2009	Dead Air	Vernon	
2016	The Secrets of Emily Blair	John Doe	Final film role

=== Television ===
Year	Title	Role	Notes
1983	American Playhouse	Conveener / Homer	Episode: "The Skin of Our Teeth"
1983	Hardcastle and McCormick	Jesse Roberts	Episode: "Just Another Round of That Old Song"
1986	Code of Vengeance	Jack Fergusen	Episode: "Rustler's Moon"
1987	Hunter	Kirkland	Episode: "Hot Pursuit, Part 2"
1987–1994	L.A. Law	Benny Stulwicz	144 episodes Primetime Emmy Award for Outstanding Supporting Actor in a Drama Series (1988–1989); Viewers for Quality Television Award for Best Supporting Actor in a Quality Drama Series (1988–1989); Nominated – Golden Globe Award for Best Supporting Actor – Series, Miniseries or Television Film (1989–1990, 1992); Nominated – Primetime Emmy Award for Outstanding Supporting Actor in a Drama Series (1990)
1989–1990	Tales from the Crypt	Killer Santa, Tobias	2 episodes: "And All Through the House" and "The Secret"
1995	The Outer Limits	Robert Vitale	Episode: "The Message"
1995	The Naked Truth	Dr. Bryce Fromm	Episode: "Elvis Is Coming!"
1996	Superman: The Animated Series	Mr. Eelan	Voice, episode: "My Girl"
1996	Road Rovers	Captain Zachary Storm	Voice, 2 episodes
1997	Spy Game	Leo Ludwig	Episode: "Well, Nothing to Fear but Death Itself"
1997	Dead Man's Gun	Samuel 'Buryin' Sam' Roller	Episode: "Buryin' Sam"
1998	Prey	Dr. Walter Attwood	14 episodes
1998	Fantasy Island	Bill Terken	Episode: "Estrogen"
1999	Batman Beyond	Jackson Chappell	Voice, episode: "The Winning Edge"
1999–2001	Johnny Bravo	Pops, additional voices	Voice, 26 episodes
2000	The Fearing Mind	Police Officer Hooper	Episode: "On the Road"
2000	Star Trek: Voyager	Chellick	Episode: "Critical Care"
2001	Stargate SG-1	Burrock	Episode: "Beast of Burden"
2001	Thieves	Robert Ventana	Episode: "The Long Con"
2002	As Told by Ginger	Dr. Weinstein	Voice, episode: "Never Can Say Goodbye"
2002	Six Feet Under	Inspector Gerson	Episode: "The Last Time"
2002	A Nero Wolfe Mystery	Hackett	Episode: "Help Wanted, Male"
2002	Firefly	Sir Warwick Harrow	Episode: "Shindig"
2003	Crossing Jordan	Tom	Episode: "Wild Card"
2003	Justice League	Colonel Vox	Voice, episode: "Maid of Honor"
2004	What's New, Scooby-Doo?	Moss T. Meister	Voice, episode: "Recipe for Disaster"
2006	7th Heaven	Mr. Riley	Episode: "And More Secrets"
2008	Boston Legal	Bishop Luke Bernard	Episode: "The Gods Must Be Crazy"

=== Video games ===
Year	Title	Role	Notes
2008	Star Wars: The Force Unleashed	Kazdan Paratus	
