= Phoenix Society for Burn Survivors =

U.S. non-profit organization

Phoenix Society for Burn Survivors is an American non-profit organization. As "one of the first burn support organizations in the United States", it is "dedicated to empowering anyone affected by a burn injury". It is based in Grand Rapids, Michigan.

== History ==
The organization was founded in 1977 by Alan Breslau, a man who was extensively burned due to a commercial airliner crash in 1963. After visiting a boy at a burn center several years earlier, Breslau recognized a need for peer support for those with burn injuries.

== Activities ==
The Phoenix Society offers an array of support to those it serves. It has an online community to connect these people. Its program SOAR is focused on one-on-one peer support for people recently affected by burn injuries with those who have already been affected and involved in recovery, including family, friends, and caregivers. A special subset of this type of care for youngsters and adolescents also exists to address the special needs of this group.

The organization holds an annual international conference, The Phoenix World Burn Congress, where "900 burn survivors, their families, caregivers, burn care professionals, and firefighters" meet and exchange information, ideas, and support.

The Phoenix Society also organizes events and demonstrations to educate the public, and to raise awareness and funds for their cause.
