= Deidre Kitcher =

Deidre Kitcher is an Australian film producer, and co-founder of Filmscope Entertainment with her partner John V. Soto. Kitcher has produced three of John V. Soto's films, Crush (2009), Needle (2010) and The Reckoning (2014).

== Career ==
Kitcher founded Filmscope Entertainment with her partner John V. Soto in 2007. Filmscope Entertainment is an Australian-based production company that makes commercial genre films. In 2009, she produced Crush, a thriller film following an international architecture student at University of Western Australia and martial arts champ, who finds work as a house sitter for the wealthy owners of a home in Perth. The film was shot on location at Perth, Western Australia including South Perth, Perry Lakes Reserve, University of Western Australia and West Perth. The film was released on 54 countries worldwide.

In 2010, she produced the supernatural thriller film Needle, a murder mystery, with six distinct clues pointing to one of ten suspects. In premiered at CinefestOZ in August 2010. It won a number of awards, most notably Best Horror Make-up Effects from Screamfest (2010) and Best Cinematography from both the British Horror Film Festival (2010) and the Melbourne Underground Film Festival (2011). Needle was sold to 82 countries worldwide, and has achieved significant success in Turkey which opened at No. 4 across 62 screens.

Filmscope's feature film The Reckoning (2014), a $2.35 million crime thriller starring Jonathon LaPaglia and Luke Hemsworth, was completed in January 2014. It premiered at CinefestOZ on 29 August, and was released on five cinemas nationally in Perth, Sydney, Brisbane and Melbourne on 5 September. The Reckoning follows Detective Robbie Green, who after his partner is murdered, must track down two teenage runaways whose video footage contains the identity of the killer.

== Filmography ==
Title	Year	Role	Format	Status
The Reckoning	2014	Producer	Feature	Released
Needle	2010	Producer	Feature	Released
Crush	2009	Producer	Feature	Released
