= Griffin (The Invisible Man) =

Titular fictional character from H.G. Wells' novel The Invisible Man

- The Invisible Man character
- Griffin, portrayed by Claude Rains in the 1933 film in an invisible state wearing an outfit to enable others to see him
- First appearance: The Invisible Man
- Created by: H. G. Wells
- Portrayed by: Claude Rains; Andrey Kharitonov; Christian Slater; Oliver Jackson-Cohen; Michael Dorman

In-universe information
- Full name: Jack Griffin (original film); Adrian Griffin (remake)
- Alias: The Invisible Man
- Species: Human
- Gender: Male
- Title: Doctor
- Occupation: Scientist
- Significant others: Flora Cranley (fiancée) (original film); Cecilia Kass (fiancée) (remake)
- Relatives: Frank Griffin (brother; original film series); Frank Raymond (grandson; original film series); Tom Griffin (brother; remake)
- Nationality: English
- Date of Birth: 1890s-1900s (original film); 1985-1986 (remake)
- Status: Deceased

Griffin, also known as the Invisible Man, is a fictional character who serves as both the protagonist and antagonist of H. G. Wells' 1897 science fiction novel The Invisible Man. In the original work, Griffin is a scientist whose research in optics and experiments into changing the human body's refractive index to that of air results in him becoming invisible. After becoming invisible, he wraps his head in bandages and dons a pair of goggles or glasses in order to enable others to see him. Unable to reverse the invisibility process, he descends into insanity and becomes a criminal.

The character and variations thereof have been featured in various media, including films, television series and merchandise. The most famous non-literary incarnation of Griffin is portrayed by Claude Rains in the 1933 film The Invisible Man, distributed by Universal Pictures. The film spawned a number of sequels that feature different invisible characters. Griffin and the 1933 film have become iconic in popular culture, particularly in regards to horror fiction. A new film, loosely inspired by the original novella and the original film, again titled The Invisible Man, was released in 2020.

== Overview ==
Griffin is a brilliant research scientist who discovers a formula for making a human being invisible. The formula entails taking opium and another drug, which makes his blood boil, then processing his body in a radiator engine. He succeeds, but he finds himself unable to reverse the process. Unlike the character in the 1933 film, the Griffin of the novel is possibly a psychopath or sociopath even before he makes himself invisible.

== In the novel ==
Griffin is a gifted young medical student with albinism who studies optical density. He believes he is on the verge of a great scientific discovery, but feels uncomfortable working under his professor named Hobbema (whom he calls a "thief of ideas"). To ensure that he gets sole credit for the discovery, he leaves the university and moves to a dingy apartment to continue his experiments alone.

To finance his experiments, Griffin robs his own father, which drives the father to commit suicide (because the money had not even been his own). Working as a recluse in his flat, Griffin invents a formula to bend light and decrease the refractive index of physical objects, making them invisible. He intends from the start to perform the process on the neighbours' cat and then on himself, but is forced to rush his experiments due to persistent intrusion from his landlord, who is suspicious of his activities and wonders if he is a vivisectionist. He processes himself to hide from his landlord and sets fire to the building to cover his tracks. He winds up alone, wandering invisible and naked through the streets of London, struggling to survive out in the open, unseen by those around him.

To make himself visible again, Griffin steals some clothes from a dingy backstreet theatre shop, including a trench-coat and hat. He wraps his head in bandages to conceal his invisibility, covering his eyes with large dark goggles. He takes up residence in the Coach and Horses Inn in the village of Iping so he can reverse his experiment in a quiet environment. Complications arise with locals unnerved by his appearance, particularly Teddy Henfrey, a clock-jobber who considers him to be a criminal evading prosecution, and Mr Cuss, who first encounters his invisibility. As a result, his progress slows and he has insufficient money to satisfy the innkeeper Mrs Hall. To pay the bill, Griffin burgles the home of Reverend Bunting. The police pursue him and in a fit of frustrated anger, he reveals his invisibility by throwing off his clothes and escaping.

Now driven insane by his inability to reverse the experiment, Griffin seeks assistance from a tramp named Thomas Marvel. He has Marvel carry money for him, but Marvel runs away with the money. Griffin pursues him to the town of Port Burdock where he runs into his old schoolmate Dr Kemp. Still bitter and angry towards the rest of humanity, Griffin attempts to convince Kemp to be his visible partner and help him begin a "reign of terror". Kemp, rather than assisting the crazed Invisible Man, alerts Colonel Adye of the Port Burdock police. Furious, Griffin vows to kill Kemp, but is forced to flee.

Kemp rallies the people of Port Burdock, who find and overcome Griffin when he attempts a one-man siege on Kemp's house. Griffin is surrounded and savagely beaten by navvies. His last words are "Mercy! Mercy!", prompting Kemp to call off the mob and administer first aid, though it is too late. Griffin dies, becoming visible again, revealing a brutally battered corpse. A police officer asks for a blanket to cover Griffin's face.

== Universal Monsters ==
In the 1933 film The Invisible Man, Griffin's first name is Jack (the novel never reveals his first name). He was played by Claude Rains.

Jack Griffin works for Dr Cranley, assisting him in food preservation experiments alongside his friend Dr Arthur Kemp. Griffin is deeply in love with Cranley's daughter, Flora, and the two plan to marry, but Griffin is poor and thus afraid he has nothing to offer her. He begins experimenting with an obscure and dangerous drug called monocane, hoping his work will make him rich and famous—and a worthwhile husband for Flora. Griffin discovers a combination of monocane and other chemicals that makes a person invisible. Too excited by his discovery to think clearly, Griffin leaves Kemp and the Cranleys to complete the experiment in solitude. He injects himself with the formula over the course of a month and becomes invisible. Only after he is invisible does he realise that he does not know how to reverse the process. Panicking, Griffin goes to the village of Iping and rents a room in the Lion's Head Inn, where he begins searching for a formula to reverse the invisibility. He makes himself appear visible by wrapping his head in bandages and wearing dark goggles. Curious locals, the maddening side effects of monocane, and frustration from multiple failed tests drive Griffin insane. After he assaults|Jenny Hall and severely injures her husband Herbert, Griffin is confronted by the police, but sheds his clothing to be invisible and eludes them. He seeks help from Kemp, but the monocane has so affected his mind that he succumbs to megalomania and plans world domination with "invisible armies". He wants to make Kemp his visible partner and assistant. Not even a visit from Flora and her father helps ease Griffin's increasing insanity. He vows to kill Kemp after his old friend alerts Inspector Lane to his whereabouts and despite intensive police protection surrounding Kemp, Griffin eventually makes good on his threats. After killing Kemp by tying him up in his car and sending it over a cliff, he seeks refuge from the cold in a farmer's barn. The farmer summons police, who set fire to the barn. As Griffin flees the burning barn, the Chief of Detectives, who can see his footprints in the snow, shoot at him, the shot passing through both of his lungs. Griffin dies from the gunshot wounds in the hospital. During this, the effects of the monocane begin to wear off and Griffin returns to sanity apologising for his crimes by saying "I meddled in things that man must leave alone". The invisibility also wears off in death and Griffin's body becomes visible again.

The film portrays Griffin more sympathetically than the novel. The novel's Griffin is callous and cruel from the beginning and only pursues the experiment for wealth and his ego. The movie shows Griffin as an honourable man who is misguided. His insanity is purely a side-effect of the invisibility drug and his motivation for the experiment was a misguided desire to do good for science and mankind, born primarily out of his love for his fiancée.

=== Other Universal incarnations ===
- The Invisible Man Returns (1940): Vincent Price stars as Sir Geoffrey Radcliffe / Invisible Man, the owner and heir to a coal mining factory. Radcliffe tries to clear himself of a murder charge for the death of his brother, Sir Michael Radcliffe. He receives the invisibility serum from his best friend Frank Griffin (Jack Griffin's brother) and later escapes from his execution to the house of his friend and co-worker Ben Jenkins. He lives there for a while, reuniting with his lost love Helen Manson as well. However, policemen arrive at the place, causing Geoffrey to escape and later meet Frank again at his coal mining factory. There he overhears Willie spears, a former night watchman and now superintendent, threaten to shut Griffin's laboratory down. Geoffrey realises that Spears helped in killing his brother. He finds Spears and starts interrogating him by turning off his car engine and beating him. Finally Spears tells Geoffrey who did the murder before falling unconscious. Geoffrey then finds out that his cousin Richard Cobb was the killer; later, he goes to Cobb's house and threatens him in front of Helen. Richard calls the police, and they try to catch Radcliffe; however, he manages to escape quickly and then goes back to Helen and Frank. Soon he starts to go mad, causing Frank to lock him up before the police arrive. In the commotion, Geoffrey escapes from Frank as well. The next morning he threatens to kill Cobb with a revolver and walks him to Willie Spears's house. It is also revealed that Geoffrey hanged Spears, but the latter is still alive to tell Geoffrey that Cobb murdered Michael. This makes Richard kill Willie and then escape from Geoffrey, who chases him to the coal mining factory, where Helen and Frank are also. The former two (Geoffrey and Richard) fight atop a wagon on a coal-train track. Geoffrey defeats Cobb before getting shot by Police Inspector Sampson from below, whilst the wagon crashes downwards. After the commotion, Geoffrey is injured and taken to the hospital. Cobb, before dying, finally tells Frank, Helen, and Sampson that he killed Geoffrey's brother. Geoffrey is expected to die, but one of the workers donates his blood to Frank who uses it to revive, heal, and revert Geoffrey to human form. It ends with Geoffrey being alive and reuniting with Helen as Frank smilingly looks on.
- The Invisible Woman (1940): Virginia Bruce stars as Kitty Carroll / Invisible Woman. A comedic instalment in the franchise, Carroll, a fashion model, becomes invisible after being subjected to experimentation by Professor Gibbs who uses his new invisibility machine on her. It is also revealed that alcohol makes her invisible. Kitty first uses her invisibility to get revenge on her sadistic and mean boss Growley before returning to Gibbs's lab; later, she goes with him to a cottage in the woods to meet Richard Russell, Gibbs's landlord, who pays for his lab and wants to kick him out along with his long-suffering butler George. Richard finally witnesses invisible Kitty, and the two form an attraction to each other. Kitty becomes visible again, but Richard is knocked out and Kitty and Gibbs are kidnapped by gangster Blackie Cole and his henchmen. Cole wants to become invisible like Carroll and plans to use it to immigrate to U.S. from the Mexican border. He threatens Gibbs to force him replicate his invisibility machine. He tests it on one of his henchmen; however, when it doesn't work, he kicks the man out and threatens to kill Gibbs and Kitty. Meanwhile, the former henchman goes to Richard and George and informs them where Kitty and the professor are. The three arrive there just in time for Kitty to drink alcohol, turn invisible, and beat up the gangsters along with Richard, using a machine gun along the way. She finally gets Blackie in the end as she electrocutes his whole body, injuring and probably killing him as well. A year or so later, Kitty, now visible again, is married to Richard. He looks at her and his newborn baby along with Gibbs and George; the baby, however, turns invisible, causing everyone to panic hilariously and Gibbs to laugh. There is no direct link to the previous films or Wells's novel in this movie.
- Invisible Agent (1942): Jon Hall stars as Frank Griffin Jr. / Frank Raymond / Invisible Man. Raymond is the son of Frank Griffin and the nephew of the original Invisible Man Jack Griffin. Heroically uses the formula on himself to help the Allies during WWII after the Pearl Harbor Attack and after a bunch of Axis Powers spies led by Conrad Stauffer and Baron Ikito attack the antiques shop where he works. Frank goes to Nazi Germany by becoming invisible, meets Allied Russian agent Maria Sorenson, and gets the files needed for the Allies. Later he gets kidnapped by the Japanese; however, the Nazis arrive and fight with the Japanese. Frank escapes with Sorenson meanwhile as Ikito kills Stauffer and then himself. Frank and Maria then escape, bombing Nazi planes along the way. Nazi officer Karl Heiser tries to kill them but is gunned down by Nazi soldiers for escaping the jail he was put into. Frank and Maria then crash but are rescued by Allied soldiers. The next morning, Frank wakes up in the hospital and is revealed to be visible again, to Maria's shock and happiness, even though she wants to know how and when.
- The Invisible Man's Revenge (1944): Jon Hall stars as Robert Griffin / Invisible Man. Griffin is a madman who seeks revenge on those who have wronged him, and becomes invisible upon experimentation by eccentric scientist Dr Peter Drury. He uses his invisibility to get revenge on his former friends and business partners-turned-enemies, Sir Jasper and Lady Irene Herrick. He badly scares Irene and persuades Jasper to let him marry his and Irene's daughter, Julie Herrick. However, Griffin realises that Julie is to be married to reporter Mark Foster, and when he starts to lose his invisibility he goes back to Drury's house and forces the doctor to transfer his blood to him. This causes Drury to die. Griffin, now human again, sets the house afire as Mark arrives and tries to kill the latter because he can then marry Julie. Mark survives, however, and Dr Drury's pet dog Brutus escapes the house and starts to follow Robert to get revenge on him for killing his master. Robert then arrives at the Herrick household where he runs into his old friend and coal-mine worker Herbert Higgins, now a blackmailer. Robert tells Herbert to distract the people in the house and Brutus whilst he slowly starts turning invisible again. Mark investigates; invisible Robert knocks him out and tries to transfer his blood to him. Meanwhile, outside, Higgins tries his best to distract Sir Basil, Jasper's friend, a police officer and Brutus. However, he fails, causing them and Herbert to go into the basement and witness Robert almost kill Foster. Griffin tries to attack them; however, he is pinned down and mauled to death by Brutus whilst the policeman and Basil rescue Mark. It ends with Mark and Julie reuniting, Basil explaining Griffin's case, Brutus staying at the Herrick House, and Higgins realising the errors of his blackmailing ways.
- Abbott and Costello Meet Frankenstein (1948): Vincent Price reprises his role in a cameo appearance at the end of the film. After Wilbur (Costello) berates Chick (Abbott) for not believing his warnings about Dracula and Frankenstein's Monster, Chick remarks that with their having seen the last of them and the Wolf Man, there's nobody to frighten them. A lit cigarette appears to float as the Invisible Man remarks that he'd hoped to get in on the excitement. He introduces himself, prompting Wilbur and Chick to leap out of the boat.
- Abbott and Costello Meet the Invisible Man (1951): Arthur Franz stars as Tommy Nelson / Invisible Man. Nelson, a middleweight boxer, is framed for the murder of his manager. As he tries to clear himself of the crime, he gets the invisibility serum from a former colleague of Jack Griffin's. He then teams up with detectives Bud and Lou, shenanigans ensue, and it all wraps up with Nelson killing the real murderers. At the end, he is cured of invisibility by Lou donating his blood to him. Claude Rains appears in a still-photograph, reprising his role as John "Jack" Griffin.

=== Reboot ===
Johnny Depp was to portray the Invisible Man as part of Universal's Dark Universe, a shared cinematic universe based on the classic Universal Monsters. It was uncertain if the character would be Dr Griffin or a very different character. But on November 8, 2017, producers Alex Kurtzman and Chris Morgan moved on to other projects, leaving the future of the Dark Universe in doubt.

In January 2019, Universal announced that the plan moving forward was to focus on filmmaker-driven films, and less of an interconnection in the Dark Universe. Ultimately, Elisabeth Moss was given a starring role in the film as Cecilia Kass, while Oliver Jackson-Cohen and Michael Dorman were respectively cast as Adrian and Tom Griffin. The Invisible Man re-entered development, written and directed by Leigh Whannell and produced by Jason Blum. Johnny Depp still had option to star in the lead role, though all parties ultimately passed. The Invisible Man was released on February 28, 2020, receiving positive reviews. In this version, Adrian Griffin is a wealthy scientist and pioneer in the field of optics who fakes his death and becomes invisible to torment his ex-girlfriend Cecilia, whom he constantly abused and controlled. Unlike the novel and 1933 film, the invisibility is achieved through a suit fixed with hundreds of micro-cameras instead of an invisibility formula. When Adrian's brother Tom was found in the invisibility suit, Adrian used him as a scapegoat, claiming to Cecilia that Tom was holding him prisoner. In an attempt to get Adrian to confess, she meets him at his house to discuss her pregnancy while James listens in on a wire. Adrian insists that he had actually been kidnapped, claiming that his experience has changed his outlook on life and their relationship. Cecilia departs to use the restroom. Moments later, the room's security camera captures Adrian seemingly committing suicide by slicing his throat. Cecilia emerges from the bathroom and "frantically" calls the police. Off-camera, she taunts him to reveal that she had retrieved the earlier-hidden second invisibility suit to kill Adrian, and a horrified Adrian then dies, realising that Cecilia has won and he has ultimately lost. When Detective James Lanier arrives and asks what happened, she confirms what the camera saw. He spots the invisibility suit in her bag, but accepts her story and allows her to leave.

== Appearances in other works ==
=== Film ===
==== Mad Monster Party? and Mad Mad Mad Monsters ====
The Invisible Man appears in the Rankin Bass film Mad Monster Party? voiced by Allen Swift, performing an impression of Sydney Greenstreet. This depiction of the Invisible Man is shown to wear a fez, dark glasses, and a purple dressing gown. He is among the monsters invited by Baron Boris von Frankenstein to attend his meeting at his castle on the Isle of Evil in the Caribbean Sea. A pie thrown into his face reveals that he has an enormous nose and is extremely ugly.

Swift reprises his role as the Invisible Man in Mad Mad Mad Monsters. This version goes by the name of Claude. He, his invisible wife Nagatha, their invisible son Ghoul, and his invisible dog Goblin are invited by Baron Henry von Frankenstein to attend the wedding of Frankenstein's Monster and the Monster's Bride at the Transylvania-Astoria Hotel on the midnight of Friday the 13th.

==== Hotel Transylvania series ====
In Genndy Tartakovsky's Sony Pictures Animation Hotel Transylvania film series , Griffin is voiced by David Spade. He is one of the supporting characters who checks into Hotel Transylvania, being one of Count Dracula's friends. This version is completely invisible and his glasses are the only thing that can be seen in the movie. He is more outwardly, heroic and laid-back than his previous incarnations.

==== Monster Mash (2024) ====
A variant of Griffin called Hawley Griffin appears in the 2024 film Monster Mash, portrayed by Gabriel Pranter. He is targeted by Dr. Victor Frankenstein's monstrous creation Boris who steals some of his invisible skin which Dr. Frankenstein plans to incorporate into his ultimate monster. He joins forces with Count Dracula, Ramesses the Mummy, and a werewolf named Charles Conliff to rescue Dracula's daughter Elisabeta and fight Dr. Frankenstein.

=== Radio ===
John Hurt voiced Griffin in the Big Finish Productions adaptation, released shortly after Hurt's death in 2017.

== Influence ==
=== Literature ===
==== The League of Extraordinary Gentlemen ====
In Alan Moore and Kevin O'Neill's comic book series, The League of Extraordinary Gentlemen, Hawley Griffin is depicted as a member of the Victorian-era team of agents for which the series is named. Griffin is given the first name "Hawley" in the title (as a reference to Hawley Crippen). Griffin has escaped his comeuppance at the end of the novel by using an invisible half-wit as a decoy allowing him to escape to Rosa Coote's boarding school, where he is captured by the League. Like the novel he is a power-hungry psychopath. In the second volume, he assaults Mina Murray, betrays his teammates and sides with the Martians.

==== The Nobody ====
In Jeff Lemire's The Nobody, a graphic novel retelling of the Wells story, the Invisible Man is named John Griffen. The character goes through a similar episode as the Invisible Man's Griffin does. Both men hide out in an inn in a small town, only to be driven out because of fear and curiosity.

=== Film and television ===
==== The Invisible Man (2000 TV series) ====
The Syfy television series The Invisible Man features thief character Darien Fawkes, played by Vincent Ventresca, who is recruited by a spy agency and implanted with an invisible gland.

==== The League of Extraordinary Gentlemen ====
In the 2003 film adaptation of the League of Extraordinary Gentlemen comic book series, the Invisible Man who joins the League is not Griffin (due to copyright issues), but Rodney Skinner (potrayed by Tony Curran) is a gentleman thief who stole the invisibility formula from the original Invisible Man.

==== Hollow Man series ====
In Claudio Fäh's 2006 Destination Films film Hollow Man 2, Michael Griffin (portrayed by Christian Slater) is a soldier upon whom the formula developed by Sebastian Caine five years earlier is applied by the Reisner Institute, as a part of a covert operation by the United States Department of Defense to create the perfect assassin for black ops missions, codenamed "Silent Knight".

== See also ==
- The Invisible Man in popular culture
- Universal Monsters
- Hollow Man

== Bibliography ==
- Browning, John Edgar; Picart, Caroline Joan (2010). Dracula in Visual Media: Film, Television, Comic Book and Electronic Game Appearances, 1921–2010. McFarland & Company. p. 203. ISBN 9780786433650.
