= Jason Ballantine =

Australian film editor

- Born: 1970 (age 55–56); Australia
- Occupation: film editor
- Years active: 1998–present

Jason Ballantine (born 1970) is an Australian film editor. He was the president of the Australian Screen Editors guild from 2010 to 2013. He was nominated in the category of Best Editing in the 2005 Australian Film Institute Awards for his work on Wolf Creek. In 2019, he was inducted as a member of the American Cinema Editors.

== Filmography ==
Year	Title	Director	Notes
2002	Star Wars: Episode II – Attack of the Clones	George Lucas	Assistant editor
2005	Wolf Creek	Greg McLean	Nominated — AACTA Award for Best Editing
2005	Star Wars: Episode III – Revenge of the Sith	George Lucas	Assistant editor
2006	The Bet	Mark Lee	
2006	The Caterpillar Wish	Sandra Sciberras	
2007	Rogue	Greg McLean	Nominated — ASE Award for Best Editing
2008	Prom Night	Nelson McCormick	Remake of 1980 film
2009	Crush	Jeffrey Gerritsen; John V. Soto	
2010	Uninhabited	Bill Bennett	
2010	Needle	John V. Soto	
2012	Wish You Were Here	Kieran Darcy-Smith	FCCA Award for Best Editing; Nominated — AACTA Award for Best Editing; Nominated — ASE Award for Best Editing
2013	The Great Gatsby	Baz Luhrmann	AACTA Award for Best Editing; FCCA Award for Best Editing; Nominated — ASE Award for Best Editing
2015	The Longest Ride	George Tillman Jr.	
2015	Mad Max: Fury Road	George Miller	Additional editor
2016	Spectral	Nic Mathieu	
2017	It	Andy Muschietti	
2018	How It Ends	David M. Rosenthal	
2019	It Chapter Two	Andy Muschietti	
2021	The Guilty	Antoine Fuqua	
2021	The King's Man	Matthew Vaughn	
2023	The Flash	Andy Muschietti	Likeness used for Jay Garrick / Flash
2024	The Crow	Rupert Sanders	
2025	Ballerina	Len Wiseman	
2026	Jack Ryan: Ghost War	Andrew Bernstein	

Short films

Year	Title	Director
2002	Free	Jeremy Cumpston
2002	Running Down These Dreams	Jane Manning
2004	Chipman	Annabel Osborne
2009	Emergence	Anthony Furlong
2009	The Seventh Wave	Martin Thorne
2009	Radio Pirates	Craig Newland

Television

- Hi-5 (1998)
- I'm a Celebrity...Get Me Out of Here! (2002)
