= The Flight Before Christmas =

The Flight Before Christmas may refer to:

- The Flight Before Christmas (2008 film)
- The Flight Before Christmas (2015 film)
- Shaun the Sheep: The Flight Before Christmas, a 2021 Shaun the Sheep special
