= The Invisible Man (2020 film) =

2020 film by Leigh Whannell

- Theatrical release poster
- Directed by: Leigh Whannell
- Written by: Leigh Whannell
- Based on: The Invisible Man; 1897 novel by H. G. Wells
- Produced by: Gavin O'Connor; Michael Helfant; Bradley Gallo
- Starring: Elisabeth Moss; Aldis Hodge; Storm Reid; Harriet Dyer; Michael Dorman; Oliver Jackson-Cohen
- Cinematography: Stephen F. Windon
- Edited by: Andrew Mondshein
- Music by: Benjamin Wallfisch
- Production companies: Blumhouse Productions; Goalpost Pictures; Nervous Tick Productions
- Distributed by: Universal Pictures
- Release dates: February 27, 2020 (Australia); February 28, 2020 (United States)
- Running time: 124 minutes
- Countries: Australia; United States
- Language: English
- Budget: $7 million
- Box office: $182 million

The Invisible Man is a 2020 science fiction horror film written and directed by Leigh Whannell. Loosely based on H. G. Wells's 1897 novel, it stars Elisabeth Moss as a woman who believes she is being stalked and gaslit by her abusive ex-boyfriend (Oliver Jackson-Cohen) after he acquires the ability to become invisible. Aldis Hodge, Storm Reid, Harriet Dyer, and Michael Dorman appear in supporting roles.

Development on a contemporary film adaptation of the novel began in 2006, but was halted in 2011. An attempt at reviving the project in 2016 as part of Universal Pictures' cinematic Dark Universe was also cancelled following the critical and financial failure of The Mummy in 2017. After Universal moved away from a serialized universe to standalone films, the project reentered development in 2019 with Whannell attached.

The Invisible Man premiered in Hollywood, California on February 24, 2020, and was theatrically released on February 28, 2020, in the United States. It received highly positive reviews from critics, with praise for Whannell's direction, Moss's performance, opening sequence, atmosphere, musical score and themes on domestic abuse. The film was also a commercial success, grossing $145 million worldwide against a $7 million budget. Due to its theatrical release being cut short by the COVID-19 pandemic, the film was made available for digital rental three weeks after it premiered in the United States.

== Plot ==
Cecilia Kass is trapped in an abusive relationship with wealthy optics engineer and businessman Adrian Griffin, the founder and CEO of the human–computer augmentation company Cobalt. One night, she drugs Adrian with her diazepam and escapes his highly secured house; Adrian is awoken by a car alarm and nearly catches her, but she gets away with the help of her younger sister Emily.

Cecilia hides out with her childhood friend, San Francisco Police detective James Lanier, and his teenage daughter, Sydney. Two weeks after Cecilia's escape, news breaks that Adrian has committed suicide. His lawyer/younger brother Tom Griffin contacts Cecilia to inform her that Adrian left her $5 million in his will.

As time goes on, Cecilia suspects that there is another presence in the house after several strange events, but James assures her she is just traumatized and paranoid. During a job interview, she finds her work portfolio contents removed and then faints. The doctor tells her that high levels of diazepam were found in her system. In her bathroom, she finds the same bloodied diazepam bottle with which she drugged Adrian.

Cecilia, accompanied by James, meets with Tom again. She believes that Adrian faked his death and used his optics expertise to become invisible in order to torment her, but Tom rebuffs the idea and pleads with her to not let Adrian posthumously win, revealing that he too was a victim of Adrian's manipulations and is glad his brother is dead. Later, Emily receives a fake insulting email from Cecilia's account. Afterwards, an unseen force hits Sydney, who assumes it was Cecilia, causing James to ask her to leave. While alone at the house, Cecilia tries to catch the figure she believes hit Sydney. She finds Adrian's phone in the attic, on which she immediately receives a text saying "surprise". Cecilia dumps paint down the attic trap door, coating an invisible figure. A violent struggle ensues, but Cecilia escapes.

Determined to find answers, Cecilia goes to Adrian's home to investigate his lab, where she finds an additional invisible bodysuit, confirming her suspicions. Right after she hides the suit in their former bedroom's closet, the invisible figure attacks again, so she flees and contacts Emily. The pair meet at a restaurant, where the invisible figure slits Emily's throat and places the knife in Cecilia's hand, framing her for murder.

While awaiting trial, Cecilia is remanded to a psychiatric hospital, and at night hears a voice exclaim "Surprise". Later, she learns she is pregnant. Tom offers to get Cecilia's charges dropped if she agrees to "go back to him (Adrian)" and raise the child, implying that Tom helped stage his brother's suicide. He reveals that Adrian tampered with her birth control to impregnate her. Cecilia refuses the offer and steals a fountain pen from him. That night, she attempts suicide to lure out the invisible figure. When the figure tries to stop her, she stabs him with the pen, causing the suit to malfunction. The security team arrives, but the figure incapacitates them before fleeing the hospital with Cecilia in pursuit. To protect her unborn child, the figure threatens to attack those she loves. Cecilia races to James's house and finds the figure attacking him and Sydney. She shoots the figure dead but finds Tom in the suit. Police storm Adrian's house and find him alive, tied up and claiming that Tom held him prisoner. They conclude that Tom killed Emily as well, but Cecilia believes that Adrian set his brother up as the scapegoat for his crimes.

To get Adrian's confession, a now exonerated Cecilia meets him at his house for dinner wearing a wire, while James listens in from a few blocks away. She agrees to mend their relationship if he confesses to killing Emily. Adrian insists that Tom was responsible but claims that the experience changed his outlook on life and how he treated her. After Adrian says the word "surprise", hinting that he actually was the invisible man, Cecilia excuses herself to the bathroom. However, she equips his invisible suit that she previously hid and slits his throat, with the nearby security camera making it seem as if he committed suicide. After calling 911, she whispers "surprise" to Adrian, and he collapses dead.

When James arrives, Cecilia confirms to him what the camera captured. He notices that she is carrying the extra suit but agrees to keep silent and allows her to leave.

== Cast ==
- Elisabeth Moss as Cecilia "Cee" Kass, an architect
- Aldis Hodge as James Lanier, a San Francisco police detective, Sydney's father, and Cecilia's childhood best friend
- Storm Reid as Sydney "Sid" Lanier, James's teenage daughter
- Oliver Jackson-Cohen as Adrian Griffin, a mad scientist and the CEO of Cobalt, a company from Whannel's previous film Upgrade (2018).
- Harriet Dyer as Emily "Em" Kass, Cecilia's younger sister
- Michael Dorman as Tom Griffin, Adrian's younger brother and lawyer

Additional cast members include Renee Lim as Doctor Lee, Nicholas Hope as the head doctor at the psychiatric hospital, Nash Edgerton as a security guard, and Anthony Brandon Wong as a motorist whose vehicle is taken by Cecilia. Benedict Hardie, who appeared in director Leigh Whannell's previous film Upgrade as Fisk Brantner, plays Marc Brantner, an architect at a firm that Cecilia interviews for.

== Production ==
=== Development ===
Development of a new The Invisible Man film began as early as 2006 when David S. Goyer was hired to write the screenplay. Goyer remained attached to the project as late as 2011, with little to no further development on the film. In February 2016, the project was revived with Johnny Depp cast as the titular character and Ed Solomon writing the screenplay. It was revealed to be part of an intended cinematic universe featuring Universal Pictures' modern-day reboot of their classic monsters. The would-be film series was set to begin in 2017 with The Mummy, starring Tom Cruise, Sofia Boutella, and Russell Crowe. The Mummy director Alex Kurtzman stated that fans should expect at least one film per year from the series. However, once The Mummy was released to negative critical reception and box office returns deemed by the studio as insufficient, changes were made to the Dark Universe to focus on individual storytelling and move away from the shared universe concept.

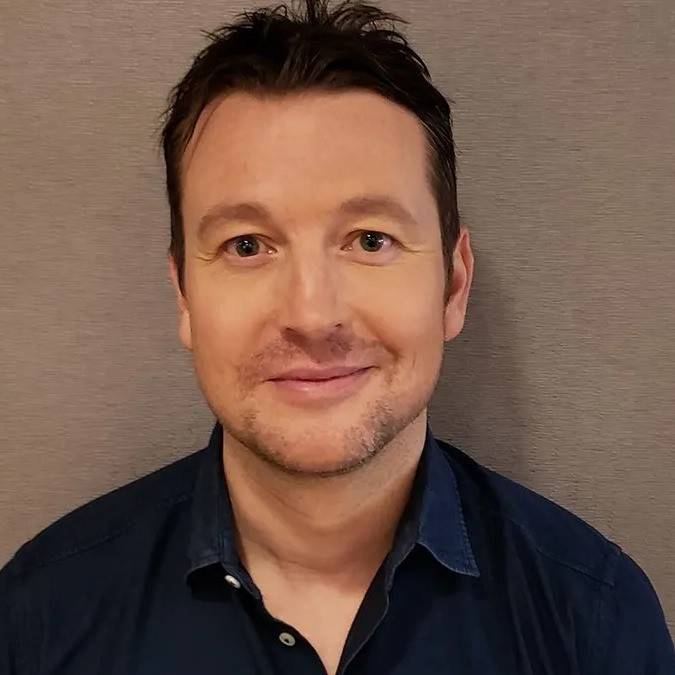
Writer and director Leigh Whannell

In January 2019, Universal announced that all future movies on their horror characters would focus on standalone stories, avoiding inter-connectivity. Successful horror film producer Jason Blum, founder of production company Blumhouse Productions, had at various times publicly expressed his interest in reviving and working on future installments within the Dark Universe films. The Invisible Man was set to be written and directed by Leigh Whannell and produced by Blum, but would not star Depp as previously reported. Whannell said the film was never planned to be a part of the Dark Universe. In March 2019, Elisabeth Moss entered early negotiations to star, with her official casting the following month. Storm Reid, Aldis Hodge, and Harriet Dyer later joined the cast, with Oliver Jackson-Cohen set to play the titular role in July. Jessica McNamee auditioned for Dyer's role.

=== Filming ===
Principal photography began on July 16, 2019, and ended on September 17, 2019, in Sydney, Australia. The filming location used for Adrian's highly secured house was Headland House in Gerringong, Australia. During production, Whannell would work with Moss to make adjustments to the script to better portray a woman's perspective.

== Music ==
Benjamin Wallfisch composed the music for the film. The score album was released on February 21, 2020, by Back Lot Music, a week before the film's release. It was released in double LP vinyl formats on June 5, 2020, by Mondo.

== Release ==
The Invisible Man was theatrically released in the United States on February 28, 2020, by Universal Pictures. It was originally scheduled for release on March 13, 2020, but in August 2019, it was moved up two weeks. As pandemic restrictions were loosened, the film was released in three Santikos Theatres locations in San Antonio, Texas on May 1, 2020. The film was released in Mainland China, on December 4, 2020.

On March 16, 2020, Universal Pictures announced that the film would be released digitally in the United States and Canada through Premium VOD on March 20, just three weeks after the film's theatrical debut and before the end of the usual 90-day theatrical run. This was because of movie theater closures that started in mid March because of the COVID-19 pandemic restrictions.

== Reception ==
=== Box office ===
The Invisible Man grossed $70.4 million in the United States and Canada, and $74.1 million in other countries, for a worldwide total of $144.5 million, against a production budget of $7 million.

In the United States and Canada, the film was projected to gross $24–30 million from 3,610 theaters in its opening weekend. It made $9.9 million on its first day, including $1.65 million from Thursday night previews. The film went on to debut to $28.2 million, topping the box office. The film made $15.1 million in its second weekend (dropping 46%) and then $5.9 million in its third weekend. In the film's fourth weekend, due to the mass theater closures around the country caused by the COVID-19 pandemic, it made $64,000 from 111 locations, mostly drive-in theaters.

The film continued to play almost exclusively at drive-ins in the following weeks; it made $444,000 in its 13th weekend, $320,800 in its 14th, and $209,000 in its 15th. The film reclaimed the top spot atop the box office in its 16th weekend, making $383,000 from 187 theaters.

=== Critical response ===
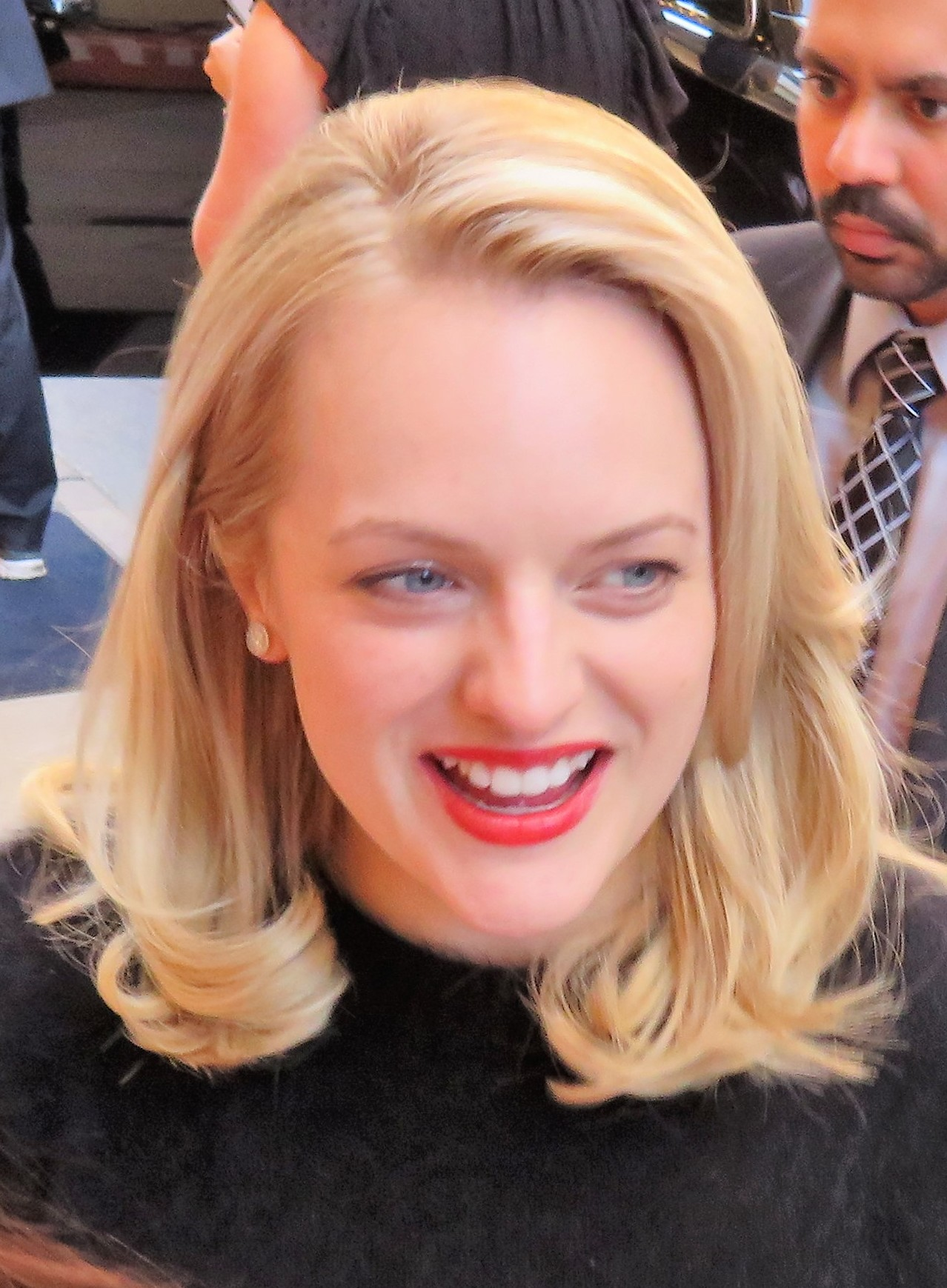
Elisabeth Moss received praise from critics for her performance in the film.

Review aggregator website Rotten Tomatoes reported that 91% of 422 reviews of the film were positive with an average rating of 7.8/10. The site's critics consensus reads: "Smart, well-acted, and above all scary, The Invisible Man proves that sometimes, the classic source material for a fresh reboot can be hiding in plain sight." As of September 2025, Rotten Tomatoes ranked it as the 30th best horror film of all time. Metacritic assigned a weighted average score of 72 out of 100, based on 58 critics, indicating "generally favorable" reviews. Audiences polled by CinemaScore gave the film an average grade of "B+" on an A+ to F scale, and PostTrak reported it received an overall positive score of 76% and an average four out of five stars, with 53% of people they polled saying they would definitely recommend the film.

Manohla Dargis of The New York Times wrote that Moss's performance "gives the movie its emotional stakes," adding, "while her agony can be unnerving, it is even more shivery when her weeping stops and this horror-movie damsel in distress becomes a threat." Writing for The A.V. Club, Jesse Hassenger gave the film a "B+", also praising Moss's performance and the film's centering of her character's experience; the publication followed up with a video review from senior writer Katie Rife and Ignatiy Vishnevetsky, who also gave a positive review, for the aesthetic and filmmaking of Blumhouse Productions and Moss's performance. Alison Willmore of Vulture commented about the effectiveness of Moss's facial expressions, and said that she "has established herself as an empress of the onscreen breakdown, our lady of ruined eye makeup". Patrick Cavanaugh of ComicBook.com gave the film four out of five stars, and wrote that Whannell's film is "an experience that is both effective as a full-blown horror film and as a chilling reminder of the abuse one can suffer from a supposed loved one."

Conversely, Nicholas Barber from BBC gave the film two out of five stars, opining that "the latest remake of the HG Wells tale offers a timely feminist spin – but it's lacking in thrills." He criticized the film's vagueness, concluding, "at a time when small-scale horror movies can be as stunning as A Quiet Place and Get Out, a film as perfunctory as The Invisible Man feels insulting." Jake Coyle of the Associated Press was also less than positive, describing it as "a bracingly modern #MeToo allegory that, despite its brutal craft, rings hollow." Sarah-Tai Black of The Globe and Mail gave the film two out of four stars, writing: "While chock full of relatively good scares, campy effects, and an ending that will tickle a very specific demographic of 1990s and 2000s thriller fans with glee, The Invisible Man doesn’t deliver more than that."

The Invisible Man appeared on 51 critics' year-end top-10 lists, including six second-place rankings.

In July 2025, The Hollywood Reporter ranked it number 17 on its list of the "25 Best Horror Movies of the 21st Century."

=== Accolades ===
Award	Date of ceremony	Category	Recipient(s)	Result	Ref.
AACTA Awards	November 30, 2020	Best Film		Nominated	
AACTA Awards	November 30, 2020	Best Direction	Leigh Whannell	Nominated	
AACTA Awards	November 30, 2020	Best Actress in a Leading Role	Elisabeth Moss	Nominated	
AACTA Awards	November 30, 2020	Best Screenplay, Original or Adapted	Leigh Whannel	Nominated	
AACTA Awards	November 30, 2020	Best Production Design	Alex Holmes and Katie Sharrock	Nominated	
AACTA Awards	November 30, 2020	Best Sound	P.K. Hooker, Will Files, and Paul 'Salty' Brincat	Won	
AACTA Awards	November 30, 2020	Best Cinematography	Stefan Duscio	Won	
AACTA Awards	November 30, 2020	Best Editing	Andy Canny	Won	
AACTA Awards	November 30, 2020	Best Visual Effects or Animation	Aevar Bjarnason, Marcus Bolton, Jonathan Dearing, and Matt Ebb	Nominated	
Alliance of Women Film Journalists	January 4, 2021	Most Daring Performance	Elisabeth Moss	Nominated	
Austin Film Critics Association	March 19, 2021	Best Actress	Elisabeth Moss	Nominated	
Austin Film Critics Association	March 19, 2021	Best Adapted Screenplay	Leigh Whannell	Nominated	
Austin Film Critics Association	March 19, 2021	Best Stunts		Won	
Austin Film Critics Association	March 19, 2021	Best Motion Capture/Special Effects Performance	Elisabeth Moss	Won	
Austin Film Critics Association	March 19, 2021	Best Motion Capture/Special Effects Performance	Luke Davis	Nominated	
Austin Film Critics Association	March 19, 2021	Best Motion Capture/Special Effects Performance	Oliver Jackson-Cohen	Nominated	
Australian Screen Editors	December 6, 2020	Best Editing in a Feature Film	Andy Canny	Won	
Bram Stoker Award	May 20, 2021	Best Screenplay	Leigh Whannell	Won	
Chicago Film Critics Association	December 21, 2020	Best Use of Visual Effects		Won	
Critics Choice Association	January 10, 2021	Best Horror Movie		Won	
Critics Choice Association	January 10, 2021	Best Actress in a Horror Movie	Elisabeth Moss	Won	
Critics' Choice Awards	March 7, 2021	Best Visual Effects		Nominated	
Golden Reel Awards	April 16, 2021	Outstanding Achievement in Sound Editing – Feature Underscore	Brett “Snacky” Pierce, Devaughn Watts	Nominated	
Hollywood Critics Association Awards	March 5, 2021	Best Horror Film		Won	
Hollywood Critics Association Awards	March 5, 2021	Best Actress	Elisabeth Moss	Nominated	
Hollywood Critics Association Awards	March 5, 2021	Best Editing	Andy Canny	Nominated	
Hollywood Critics Association Awards	March 5, 2021	Best Visual Effects	Jonathan Dearing	Won	
Hollywood Critics Association Midseason Awards	July 2, 2020	Best Picture		Runner-up	
Hollywood Critics Association Midseason Awards	July 2, 2020	Best Actress	Elisabeth Moss	Won	
Hollywood Critics Association Midseason Awards	July 2, 2020	Best Male Director	Leigh Whannell	Runner-up	
Hollywood Critics Association Midseason Awards	July 2, 2020	Best Adapted Screenplay	Leigh Whannell	Won	
Hollywood Music in Media Awards	January 27, 2021	Best Original Score in a Horror Film	Benjamin Wallfisch	Won	
Houston Film Critics Society	January 18, 2021	Best Visual Effects		Nominated	
IGN Awards	December 15, 2020	Best Movie of the Year 2020		Nominated	
IGN Awards	December 15, 2020	Best Horror Movie of 2020		Won	
IGN Awards	December 15, 2020	Best Movie Director in 2020	Leigh Whannell	Nominated	
IGN Awards	December 15, 2020	Best Lead Performer in a Movie in 2020	Elisabeth Moss	Nominated	
Independent Spirit Awards	April 22, 2021	Best Editing	Andy Canny	Nominated	
MTV Movie & TV Awards	May 16, 2021	Most Frightened Performance	Elisabeth Moss	Nominated	
People's Choice Awards	November 15, 2020	Favorite Movie		Nominated	
People's Choice Awards	November 15, 2020	Favorite Drama Movie Star	Elisabeth Moss	Nominated	
People's Choice Awards	November 15, 2020	Favorite Female Movie Star	Elisabeth Moss	Nominated	
San Diego Film Critics Society	January 11, 2021	Best Editing	Andy Canny	Won	
San Diego Film Critics Society	January 11, 2021	Best Visual Effects		Runner-up	
Saturn Awards	October 26, 2021	Best Horror Film		Won	
Saturn Awards	October 26, 2021	Best Actress	Elisabeth Moss	Won	
Saturn Awards	October 26, 2021	Best Director	Leigh Whannell	Nominated	
Seattle Film Critics Society	February 15, 2021	Best Actress	Elisabeth Moss	Nominated	
Seattle Film Critics Society	February 15, 2021	Best Visual Effects	Aevar Bjarnason, Marcus Bolton, Jonathan Dearing, and Matt Ebb	Nominated	
Seattle Film Critics Society	February 15, 2021	Best Villain	Oliver Jackson-Cohen	Won	
St. Louis Film Critics Association	January 17, 2021	Best Visual Effects		Nominated	
World Soundtrack Awards	October 24, 2020	Film Composer of the Year	Benjamin Wallfisch (also for It Chapter Two)	Nominated	

== Future ==
- The Invisible Woman: In November 2019, it was announced that a spin-off film intended to be the reboot of the female counterpart to Invisible Man was in development. Elizabeth Banks was set to star in, direct, and produce a new adaptation of The Invisible Woman (1940), based on her own original story pitch. Erin Cressida Wilson will write the script for the reboot of the female monster, while Max Handelman and Alison Small will serve as producer and executive producer, respectively. Banks was allowed to choose a project by Universal Pictures from the roster of Universal Classic Monsters, ultimately choosing The Invisible Woman.
- Untitled sequel: In February 2020, after the release of the first film, Whannell and Moss stated that the movie was standalone with a definitive ending. Whannell explained that once the movie is released, and some time passes he may consider working on a follow-up film. In May, Whannell and Blum stated that discussions regarding a sequel were ongoing. By June when asked about a sequel, Moss stated: "Look, if people want it that's kind of a big part of what we need in order to do it. So put the word out there that YOU want it and then I'll help!" In July 2020, it was officially announced that Whannell is working on a sequel to The Invisible Man. By April 2024, Moss confirmed that developments for the project are ongoing, while announcing that her production studio Love & Squalor Pictures is working with Blumhouse Productions to see the movie realized. During an interview for the film M3GAN (also from Blumhouse), James Wan expressed interest in working on a sequel alongside Whannell and Blumhouse.
