= Alex Williams (actor) =

Australian actor

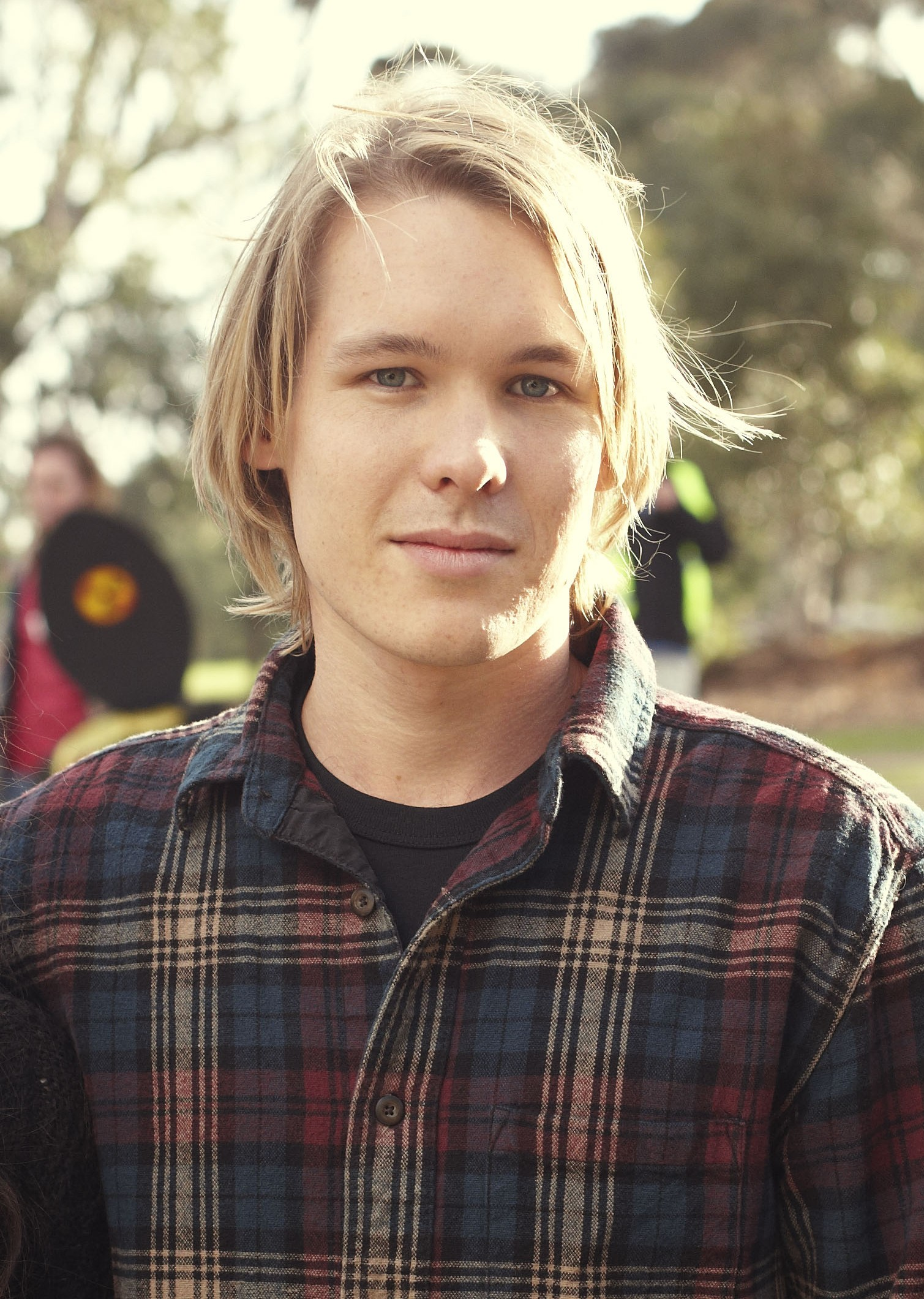
- Born: Perth, Western Australia
- Occupation: Actor
- Years active: 2012-Present
- Known for: Warnie; Underground: The Julian Assange Story

Alex Williams is an Australian actor who played the lead role of Julian Assange in the 2012 television film Underground: The Julian Assange Story. Williams also featured as cricketer Shane Warne in the television miniseries Warnie.

== Early life ==
Originally from the northern Perth suburb of Sorrento, Williams attended Mount Lawley Senior High School's Specialist Visual & Performing Arts (SVAPA) Program before moving to St Stephen's School in neighbouring Duncraig where he graduated in 2008. He then attended the Western Australian Academy of Performing Arts.

== Career ==
His first audition after graduation was for the role of Assange. His performance alongside experienced actors Rachel Griffiths and Anthony LaPaglia was critically acclaimed. In 2014, Williams appeared in the 2014 Australian film The Reckoning as a supporting character named AJ. In 2016, he played Romeo in Bell Shakespeare's production of Romeo and Juliet.

In 2016, Williams played the role of Australian motor racing driver John "Slug" Harvey in the miniseries Brock, which aired on Network Ten.

In late 2023, it was announced that Williams was cast to play the late cricketer Shane Warne in the two part miniseries titled Warnie. The trailer for the miniseries also attracted scathing negative commentary on social media when it was first shown on 31 May 2023. The two-part telemovie aired on the Nine network on 25 June and concluded on 26 June 2023.

== Filmography ==
=== Television appearances ===
Year	Title	Role	Notes	Ref
2012	Underground: The Julian Assange Story	Julian Assange	TV movie	
2014	INXS: Never Tear Us Apart	Kirk Pengilly	TV miniseries, 2 episodes	
2015	Catching Milat	Paul Onions	TV miniseries, 2 episodes	
2016	Brock	John 'Slug' Harvey	TV miniseries, 2 episodes	
2017	Friday on My Mind	Mike Vaughn	TV miniseries, 2 episodes	
2018	Chopper: The Untold Story	Jared Hamill	1 episode	
2019	Playing for Keeps	Shane Manara	TV series, 4 episodes	
2019-20	The Heights	Evan Clarke	TV series, 24 episodes	
2022	Rock Island Mysteries	Radio DJ (voice)	TV series, 2 episodes	
2022–23	Home And Away	Jacob Cameron	TV series, 11 episodes	
2023	Warnie	Shane Warne	TV miniseries, 2 episodes	

=== Film appearances ===
Year	Title	Role	Notes
2019	Spongo, Fuzz & Jalapeña	Dangles / Kray Kray (voice)	
2014	Paper Planes	Jethro	Feature film
2014	The Reckoning	AJ	Feature film
2012	Gingers	George	Short film
2011	Mercy		Short film
2011	No More Fallen Heroes	Neighbour	Short film
