= Stephen F. Windon =

Australian cinematographer (born 1959)

Stephen F. Windon ACS ASC
- Born: 28 January 1959 (age 67); Sydney, New South Wales, Australia
- Years active: 1988–present

Stephen F. Windon (born 28 January 1959) is an Australian cinematographer known for blockbuster action films, especially the Fast & Furious series.

== Filmography ==
=== Film ===
| Year | Title | Director | Notes |
|---|---|---|---|
| 1988 | Kadaicha | James Bogle | |
| 1990 | The Wonderful World of Dogs | Mark Lewis | Documentary film |
| 1993 | No Worries | David Elfick | |
| 1993 | Love in Limbo | David Elfick | |
| 1994 | Country Life | Michael Blakemore | |
| 1994 | Rapa-Nui | Kevin Reynolds | |
| 1994 | Rupert | Christopher Robin Collins | Short film |
| 1996 | Hotel de Love | Craig Rosenberg | |
| 1997 | The Postman | Kevin Costner | |
| 1998 | Firestorm | Dean Semler | |
| 1998 | The Patriot | Dean Semler | |
| 1999 | Deep Blue Sea | Renny Harlin | |
| 2002 | The Tuxedo | Kevin Donovan | |
| 2004 | Anacondas: The Hunt for the Blood Orchid | Dwight H. Little | |
| 2005 | House of Wax | Jaume Collet-Serra | |
| 2006 | The Fast and the Furious: Tokyo Drift | Justin Lin | 1st collaboration with Lin |
| 2010 | Needle | John V. Soto | |
| 2011 | Fast Five | Justin Lin | |
| 2011 | A Few Best Men | Stephan Elliott | |
| 2013 | G.I. Joe: Retaliation | Jon M. Chu | |
| 2013 | Fast & Furious 6 | Justin Lin | |
| 2015 | Furious 7 | James Wan | With Marc Spicer |
| 2016 | Star Trek Beyond | Justin Lin | |
| 2017 | The Fate of the Furious | F. Gary Gray | |
| 2020 | Sonic the Hedgehog | Jeff Fowler | |
| 2021 | F9 | Justin Lin | |
| 2022 | The Gray Man | Anthony and Joe Russo | |
| 2023 | Fast X | Louis Leterrier | |
| 2025 | The Electric State | Anthony and Joe Russo | |
| 2026 | Mortal Kombat II | Simon McQuoid | |
| 2026 | Play Dead † | Jaume Collet-Serra | Post-production |
| 2026 | Subversion † | Patrick Vollrath | Post-production |

=== Television ===
| Year | Title | Director | Notes |
|---|---|---|---|
| 1982 | Spring & Fall | Michael Carson; Julian Pringle | Episodes "Every Man for Herself" and "Thanks Brother" |
| 1989 | Mission: Impossible | Rob Stewart; Arch Nicholson; Colin Budds; Don Chaffey | 6 Episodes |
| 1996 | Naked: Stories of Men | Michael Carson; Richard Lowenstein; Robert Klenner | 3 episodes |
| 2018 | Magnum P.I. | Justin Lin | Episode "I Saw the Sun Rise" |
| 2019 | Diary of an Uber Driver | Matthew Moore | 6 episodes |

TV movies

| Year | Title | Director |
|---|---|---|
| 1986 | The Mystery of the Full Moon | Tristram Miall; James Robertson |
| 1988 | Prejudice | Ian Munro |
| 1991 | Act of Necessity | Ian Munro |
| 1995 | In Pursuit of Honor | Ken Olin |
| 2001 | South Pacific | Richard Pearce |
| 2001 | The Diamond of Jeru | Ian Barry; Dick Lowry |
| 2003 | Future Tense | Jean de Segonzac |

Miniseries

| Year | Title | Director | Notes |
|---|---|---|---|
| 1990 | Come in Spinner | Robert Marchand | |
| 1992 | The Leaving of Liverpool | Michael Jenkins | |
| 1992 | Children of the Dragon | Peter Smith | |
| 1996 | The Bite | Michael Carson | |
| 2010 | The Pacific | Jeremy Podeswa; Graham Yost; David Nutter; Tim Van Patten | 5 episodes; Primetime Emmy Award for Outstanding Cinematography |
