= Warnie (miniseries) =

Australian television program

- Genre: Drama
- Based on: Life of Shane Warne
- Written by: Matt Ford
- Directed by: Geoff Bennett
- Starring: Alex Williams; Anthony Hayes; Marny Kennedy; Andrew Blackman; Jacquie Brennan
- Country of origin: Australia
- Original language: English
- No. of series: 1
- No. of episodes: 2

Original release
- Network: Nine Network
- Release: 25 June – 26 June 2023

Warnie is an Australian television miniseries based on the life of cricketer Shane Warne that aired on 25 June and concluded on 26 June 2023. The series depicted the career and personal challenges of the late cricketer. The series was commisoned by Nine Network and received largely negative reviews from critics and viewers.

== Plot ==
=== Part 1 ===
The episode opens with a voiceover in which Shane Warne reflects on his rise to cricket, his scandals, and his receipt of the Queen's Birthday Honours and a state funeral.

Shane (Alex Williams) is shown in his hotel room recovering from shoulder surgery. As he is not considered match fit, he is at risk of being dropped from the team, but convinces captain Steve Waugh (Tom Stokes) that he is able to play. Shane later reveals he played the match with an injured shoulder.

A flashback depicts Shane's time with the St Kilda Football Club in the AFL, during which he receives a letter advising that his services are no longer required. He begins taking odd jobs, including delivery work.

Shane continues playing in local competitions and later attends the State Academy, though his fitness and smoking habits prevent him from staying long. There he meets Terry "TJ" Jenner (Anthony Hayes), under whom he trains and learns how to bowl spin.

Shane receives a call at home offering him the opportunity to play for Australia, which he celebrates with his family. After his debut, he is dropped from the team, but Jenner encourages him to train and tells him he has an opportunity he cannot waste.

Shane meets Simone Callahan (Marny Kennedy) at a cricket event, and the two begin a relationship. Shane breaks team rules to see her at a hotel after being unable to bring her on the team bus. Simone expresses concern after her friend Julie warns her about groupies, but Simone insists that Shane is loyal.

Shane goes to a nightclub, where he gambles and meets a bookmaker named John, who claims to have profited from Shane's performances. John offers him $5,000 in casino chips, which Shane declines, but later accepts $5,000 in cash to gamble. The media subsequently report on him smoking at the nightclub despite his earlier public commitment to a quit-smoking aid.

Shane and Mark Waugh (Ben Hall) later meet Malcolm Speed (Andrew Blackman), who tells them that allegations of bribery involving another team's captain, as well as their dealings with bookmakers, must be made public to protect the reputation of Cricket Australia. Shane and Mark agree, though Shane is instructed to stay behind afterwards.

Shane's bowling reputation is cemented when he delivers the "Ball of the Century" to Mike Gatting during the Ashes Test.

Subsequently, Shane and Mark are again summoned by Cricket Australia and told to publicly disclose their dealings with bookmakers. At a press conference, they admit to providing information on pitch and weather conditions in exchange for money but deny allegations of match-fixing. Shane is fined $8,000 and Mark $10,000. Their parents watch the conference from home.

While Shane and Simone prepare a nursery for their baby, news breaks that Saleem Malik has been banned for his role in match-fixing, prompting Shane to remark on his dislike of "cheaters". While Shane is on tour, Simone is shown in hospital after giving birth, watching him play with their baby beside her.

During training, Jenner notices Shane struggling with his bowling due to a swollen finger and shoulder pain. Shane insists he cannot take time off, but eventually undergoes surgery on both injuries. When he returns, his match fitness is questioned by Steve Waugh.

After a poor performance and intense media scrutiny, Shane considers quitting. Steve reassures him that he is not a "loser" and urges him to focus on the team and winning.

Following another shoulder injury, Shane undertakes rehabilitation with team physiotherapist Errol. His mother (Jacquie Brennan) expresses concern about his appearance, making comments about his weight. Shane explains that he is unable to run due to injury, but she dismissively suggests he "take a pill".

Later, Shane phones Simone and confesses that he has taken a pill from his mother which is on the banned substances list. He reveals that he has failed a drug test and that his career is in jeopardy.

=== Part 2 ===
Shane learns from his brother Jason that the drug he had taken to lose weight masked substances in his system. When Simone comments that his recovery seemed unusually fast, Shane retorts that he had the support of a world-class rehabilitation team. He adds that if he blames his mother, he will look like a "dickhead". Jason replies that "that horse bolted" and insists that no one is blaming Brigitte.

Shane faces the public fallout of the drug scandal, including a closed disciplinary hearing. During the hearing, his mother admits that she advised Shane to take the pill to "get rid of his double chin". When questioned by a lawyer (Georgina Naidu) on whether she knew the pills were banned under the Cricket Australia drug policy, she responds that they were not banned "in her house", as she had taken "heaps of them". Shane is subsequently banned from playing cricket for 12 months.

During his suspension, Shane expresses frustration at being unable to play even casually with his son. Brigitte apologises to him, but Shane reassures her that she is not at fault. His father Keith (Jeremy Stanford) is angered by the situation, describing it as a "witch hunt". Simone suggests Shane could appeal or pay a fine, but acknowledges it would not prevent ongoing scrutiny.

The controversy deepens when media report on Shane's texting scandal with a UK nurse. Simone complains that journalists have camped outside their house and even disturbed their children.

Shane holds a press conference in which he expresses regret for letting down his family. Simone watches the interview with TJ, who later admonishes Shane for continually attracting controversy.

Shane is summoned to a meeting with CEO Malcolm Speed, who presents him with articles from across the world covering his scandals. Speed informs him that he is being stripped of the vice-captaincy. Shane asks if the decision could be temporary if he can avoid further scandals. Speed replies that he would consider it but questions whether Shane can realistically stop generating controversy.

In 2005, Shane faces renewed scrutiny over an affair with British student Laura Sayers (Dannielle Woodward), who sells her story to the press for £10,000 and a holiday. After hearing the news from Jason (Darcy Kent), Shane tells Simone about the affair. A heated argument ensues, and Simone leaves the house to a waiting media pack. The scandal leads to the breakdown of their marriage, with Simone moving back to Australia with the children.

Shane later announces his retirement from cricket, citing the breakdown of his marriage. He informs the media that the final two Test matches will be his last. Asked whether he can become the world's greatest wicket-taker, Shane responds that he has always backed himself and will continue to do so. He takes his 700th wicket during his final matches and, following retirement, becomes a spokesperson for the sport. He later begins a relationship with Elizabeth Hurley.

After his retirement, Shane receives a call from TJ's wife, Ann, asking him to visit. He finds TJ seriously unwell after a heart attack. TJ urges Shane to rewatch his final match and dismisses Shane's claim that someone else will surpass him.

Shane eventually ends his relationship with Hurley due to conflicting schedules and his unwillingness to maintain a long-distance relationship. He returns to Melbourne to spend time with his family at a barbecue.

The episode concludes with a montage of Shane's career highlights played over the closing credits.

== Cast ==
The cast for the two-part drama was announced on 9 November 2022.

- Alex Williams as Shane Warne
- Marny Kennedy as Simone Callahan
- Anthony Hayes as Terry "TJ" Jenner
- Jacquie Brennan as Brigitte Warne
- Jeremy Stanford as Keith Warne
- Shanti Kali as Elizabeth Hurley
- Andrew Blackman as Malcolm Speed
- Daniel Cosgrove as Michael Clarke
- Tom Stokes as Steve Waugh
- Ben Hall as Mark Waugh
- Darcy Kent as Jason Warne
- Dannielle Woodward as Laura Sayers
- Georgina Naidu as Tribunal Lawyer

== Production ==
In 2017, the Seven Network announced a biographical drama based on the life of Shane Warne, to be titled Warnie and produced by Screentime with Matt Ford as writer. The project did not proceed at Seven, but both Screentime and Ford later returned for the version produced by the Nine Network.

In September 2022, Nine announced at its 2023 upfronts that it had commissioned a two-part biopic on Warne's life. Hours after the announcement, Warne's eldest daughter, Brooke Warne, criticised the decision, calling it "beyond disrespectful" and "insensitive" to greenlight the project only months after her father's death, and describing it as "just a ratings ploy".

The miniseries went into production following discussions between Nine and Screentime with the Warne family. Although the family later gave their support, production was reported to be undertaken in close consultation with them. Prior to the release of the series, family members were offered a private preview screening but declined to watch. Warne's father, Keith, was reported to have been angered by the portrayal.

== Reception ==
The trailer for the miniseries was first shown during the opening game of the NRL State of Origin in June 2023. It was met with criticism on social media, with some users describing it as "disgraceful". The trailer was officially released on social media on 6 June 2023.

Following its broadcast on 25 and 26 June 2023, the miniseries received largely negative reviews from critics and viewers. Critics argued that the series placed too much emphasis on the more sensational aspects of Warne's life. Warne's ex-wife, Simone Callahan, also criticised the production, describing it as "unkind" and "mean-spirited".

== Viewership ==
No.	Title	Air date	Overnight ratings		Consolidated ratings		Total viewers	Ref(s)
No.	Title	Air date	Viewers	Rank	Viewers	Rank	Total viewers	Ref(s)
1	Part One	25 June 2023	528,000	5	440,000	4	968,000	
2	Part Two	26 June 2023	434,000	14	384,000	13	818,000	

== See also ==
- List of Australian television series
