= The Gateway (2017 Australian film) =

Science fiction film by John V. Soto

The Gateway, also known as Alpha Gateway, is a 2017 Australian science fiction film directed by John V. Soto. The film stars Jacqueline McKenzie as a particle physicist who finds a way to access parallel universes while grieving over the loss of her husband.

DVD cover

== Plot ==
Jane Chandler is a particle physicist who's struggling to complete a teleporting machine, while enjoying a happy family life with her husband, Matt, and their two children. Matt dies in a traffic accident; soon after, Jane discovers that her teleporting machine prototype is actually sending objects to a parallel universe. She travels to a parallel reality and there finds another version of her husband, bringing him back to her own world. Soon, though, she learns that the person she has brought is not exactly like the husband she had lost.

== Cast ==
- Jacqueline McKenzie as Jane Chandler
- Myles Pollard as Matt Chandler
- Hayley McElhinney as Ruth
- Shannon Berry as Samantha Chandler
- Ben Mortley as Regg
- Ryan Panizza as Jake Chandler

== Reception ==
Critical reception for The Gateway has been mixed. On Rotten Tomatoes the film holds a rating of 63% based on 8 reviews. Harry Windsor of The Hollywood Reporter wrote, "A nifty premise — a grieving widow brings a parallel-world version of her husband back to her own, with disastrous consequences — isn't enough to transcend a torpid screenplay".

=== Accolades ===
- Best Feature Film at the Austin Revolution Film Festival (2017, won)
- Best Director Feature at the Austin Revolution Film Festival (2017, won)
- Best F/X Feature at the Austin Revolution Film Festival (2017, won)
- Best In Show - Feature at the Austin Revolution Film Festival (2017, won)
- Best Actress at FilmQuest (2017, nominated)
- Best Actor at FilmQuest (2017, nominated)
- Best Screenplay at FilmQuest (2017, nominated)

== See also ==
- Many-minds interpretation
- Many-worlds interpretation
- Multiverse
