= Jeremy Stanford =

Australian actor and director

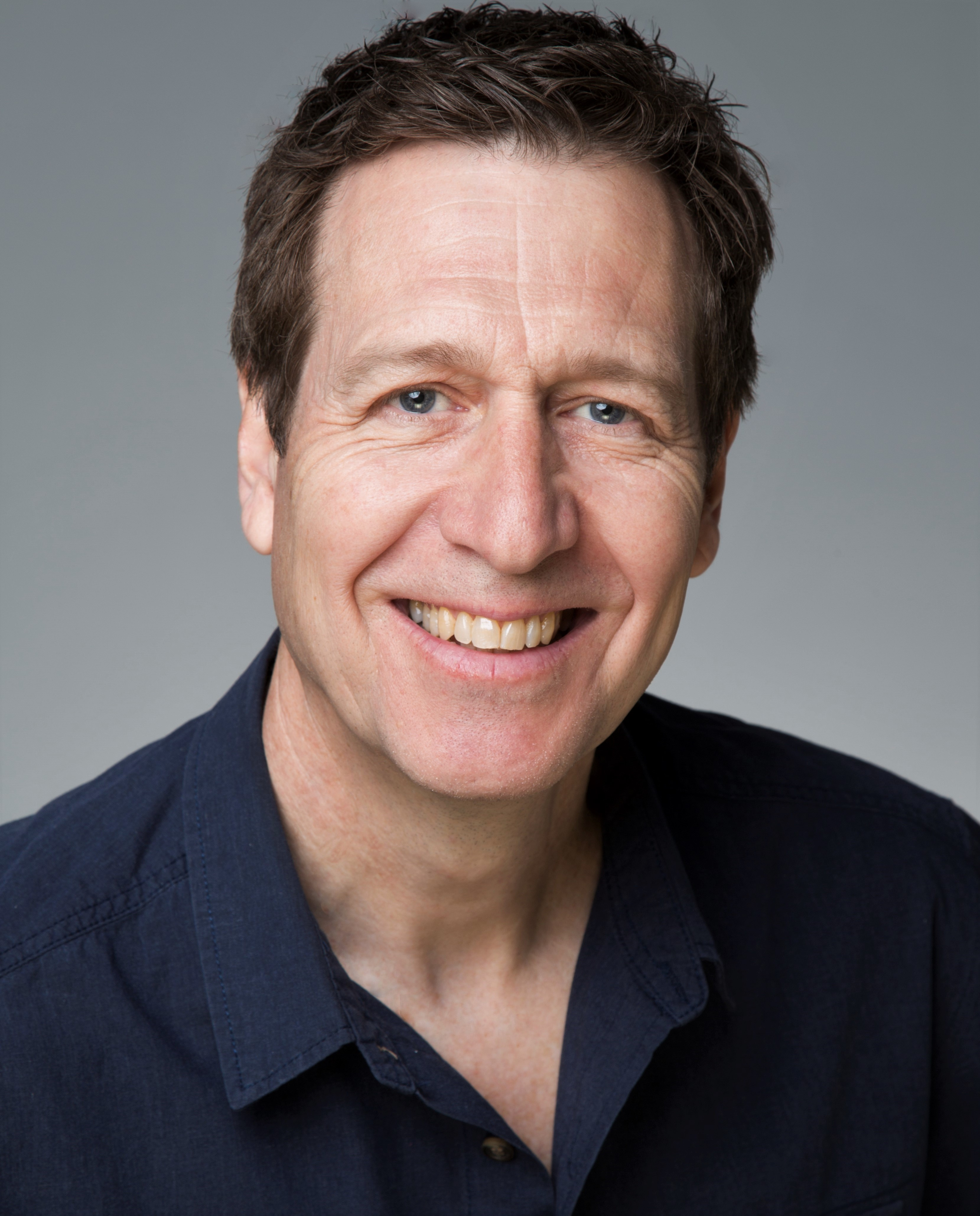
- Photograph of Jeremy Stanford
- Occupations: Actor, director
- Years active: 1979-present
- Known for: Silversun

Jeremy Stanford is an Australian actor and director, known for his role of Tick/Mitzi in the initial stage run of the musical Priscilla, Queen of the Desert.

== Career ==
In 2001, Stanford played Matthew Gallagher in season 2 of children's series Crash Zone and Detective Inspector Clifford Knox in 5 episodes of Horace and Tina. He also had a recurring role in medical drama MDA (2002–2003) as Dr Tim Hawthorn. In 2004 Stanford played Commander Cyriax in ABC kids drama Silversun appearing in 26 episodes.

He had guest roles in soap operas Neighbours and Chances, medical drama A Country Practice, police dramas Blue Heelers, Stingers and City Homicide and legal series Jack Irish (alongside Guy Pearce). He had further guest appearances in Satisfaction, crime series The Dr Blake Mysteries, prison drama Wentworth, Winners & Losers and hit newsroom drama The Newsreader (opposite Anna Torv).

In 2022, Stanford joined the cast of the biographical miniseries Warnie in the role of Keith Warne. The decision to produce the miniseries about Warne after his death was criticised by Warne's daughter Brooke who described it as "beyond disrespectful". The trailer for the miniseries also attracted negative commentary on social media when it was first shown in 2023. He is set to appear in Apple Cider Vinegar (a biographical series about disgraced Australian wellness guru Belle Gibson) in 2025.

Stanford has appeared in a number of films including comedy Compo (1989) in which he had a lead role, drama Blinder (2013) and horror film Relic (2020). In 2022 was announced as part of the cast for thriller The 13th Summer.

Stanford has also had a long and varied career in theatre since the early 1980s, portraying Buddy Holly in the national stage tour of Buddy: The Buddy Holly Story (1994) and Tick/Mitzi in Priscilla, Queen of the Desert (2006–2008). Other stage productions include Hello, Dolly! (1994–1995), Certified Male (2000–2001) and South Pacific (2012–2013). Stanford has also directed several stage productions including a national tour of Charlie and the Chocolate Factory (2019–2021).

On 14 February 2026, it was announced that Stanford would produce the film Love, Wine & Valentine.

=== Other activities ===
In 2009, Stanford established Storybox Films, a media company which developed film and TV productions and corporate videos. In 2013 the company produced a feature film The Sunset Six, which he also directed and co-wrote. He has written and co-produced two films, including psychological thriller The 13th Summer (2022) and romantic comedy He Loves Me Not (2023), both of which he also appeared in. He is also a published author.

He has also performed voiceover work in television advertisements for brands such as Lexus, SAAB, Nescafé, The ABC, Cadbury, Swisse Vitamins, L’Oréal and Holden.

== Filmography ==
=== Film ===
Year	Title	Role	Notes
1979	Apostasy	Other cast	
1988	Backstage	Bellboy	
1989	Compo	Paul Harper	
2006	Wil	Hairdresser	
2013	Blinder	President	
2020	Relic	Alex	
2023	13th Summer	Patrick	
TBA	Take My Coat	Tim	

=== Television ===
Year	Title	Role	Notes
1989	Acropolis Now	Andy Farrell	Episode: "Three Skips and a Joey"
1993	A Country Practice	Chris Brooks	Episode: "Twice Shy: Part 1"
1997–2001	Blue Heelers	Gavin Harrison / Victor Delaney / Gary Towers	3 episodes
2001	Crash Zone	Matthew Gallagher	13 episodes
2001	Horace and Tina	D.I. Clifford Knox	5 episodes
2002–2003	MDA	Dr. Tim Hawthorn	6 episodes
2003	Stingers	Ivan Flitcroft	Episode: "Killing Heidi"
2004	Silversun	Commander Aaron Cyriax / C2 / Will Power	26 episodes
2006	Wicked Science	Max	Episode: "Crazy For You"
2009	City Homicide	Eric Gorman	Episode: "Rage"
2009–2010	Satisfaction	Turnball	3 episodes
2014	Worst Year of My Life Again	Lanford King	6 episodes
2015	The Doctor Blake Mysteries	Herbert Goodman	Episode: "King of the Lake"
2015–2016	Winners & Losers	Principal Watters	5 episodes
2016	Jack Irish	Travis Dilthey	2 episodes
2016	Wentworth	Dr. Hughes	Episode: "Divide and Conquer"
2023	Warnie	Keith Warne	2 episodes
2023-25	The Newsreader	Paddy Hewitt	2 episodes
2025	Apple Cider Vinegar	Dr. Walsh	2 episodes

== Stage ==
=== As actor ===
Year	Title	Role	Venue / Co.
1981	The Cenci	Cast A	Rusden State College, Melbourne
1983	Snap, Crackers and Cocky		The Funny Bone Theatre Restaurant, Melbourne
1984	Dee Jay View		Universal Cinema, Melbourne with Theatreworks
1985	The Pub Show		Esplanade Hotel, Melbourne with Theatreworks
1987	The Mikado		Princess Theatre, Brisbane with TN! Theatre Company
1988	Storming St Kilda by Tram		Number 69 St Kilda Tram with Theatreworks for Melbourne International Comedy Festival
1991; 1994	Buddy: The Buddy Holly Story	Buddy Holly	Her Majesty’s Theatre, Melbourne, Burswood Showroom, Perth, Festival Theatre, Adelaide, Lyric Theatre, Brisbane, Her Majesty's Theatre, Sydney, Opera House, Wellington
1993	Suddenly Last Summer		Arts Theatre, Brisbane
1993	High Society		Comedy Theatre, Melbourne, State Theatre, Sydney
1994–1995	Hello, Dolly!	Cornelius Hackl	State Theatre, Melbourne, Lyric Theatre, Brisbane, Her Majesty's Theatre, Sydney, Festival Theatre, Adelaide, His Majesty's Theatre, Perth & New Zealand
1996	Looking Through a Glass Onion	John Lennon	Seymour Centre, Sydney
1997	Sweet Charity		Her Majesty's Theatre, Melbourne
1998	The Club	Gerry	Playhouse, Melbourne with MTC
2000	Company	Peter	Playhouse, Melbourne with MTC
2001	Certified Male		Brisbane Powerhouse, Gold Coast Arts Centre, Theatre Royal, Hobart, Glen Street Theatre, Sydney, The Capital - Bendigo
2001	Miss Tanaka	Mott	Malthouse Theatre, Melbourne with Playbox Theatre Company & Handspan Theatre
2002	Stones in His Pockets		Lismore City Hall, Gold Coast Arts Centre, Pilbeam Theatre, Rockhampton with MTC & STC
2003	All Het Up	Jack	Banquet Room, Adelaide, Chapel Off Chapel, Melbourne
2004	OzMade Musicals Concert		BMW Edge, Melbourne with Magnormos
2004	The Call	Tom Wills	Malthouse Theatre, Melbourne with Playbox Theatre Company for Melbourne International Arts Festival
2005	Guantanamo: Honor Bound to Defend Freedom		Fortyfivedownstairs, Melbourne with theatre@risk
2005	Stalking Matilda		Theatreworks, Melbourne with theatre@risk
2006–2008	Priscilla, Queen of the Desert	Tick/Mitzi	Lyric Theatre, Sydney, Regent Theatre, Melbourne, Civic Theatre, Auckland
2012; 2013	South Pacific	Commander Harbison	Sydney Opera House with Opera Australia & Lincoln Center Theatre
2016	The Light in the Piazza	Roy Johnson	Playhouse, Melbourne with Life Like Company
2022	An American in Paris	Monsieur Baurel	Crown Theatre, Perth
2022	Yellingbo	Danny	La Mama, Melbourne with Bowerbird Theatre

=== As director ===
Year	Title	Role	Venue / Co.
1993	My Dinner with Andre	Director	Mietta's, Melbourne
2004	What is the Matter with Mary Jane?	Director	7 Alfred Place Downstairs, Melbourne with Princess Pictures for Melbourne International Comedy Festival
2016	Into the Woods	Director	Ballarat Performing Arts Academy
2017	Rent	Director	Ballarat Performing Arts Academy
2017	First the Music Then the Words / Doctor Miracle	Director	Gertrude Opera Studio, Melbourne
2018	A Gentleman's Guide to Love and Murder	Assistant Director	Playhouse, Melbourne with The Production Company
2019; 2021	Charlie and the Chocolate Factory	Director	Capitol Theatre, Sydney, Her Majesty's Theatre, Melbourne, Lyric Theatre, Brisbane, Crown Theatre Perth

== Bibliography ==
- Year of the Queen (2007)
- Rapture (2018)
