= Trilby Glover =

Australian actress

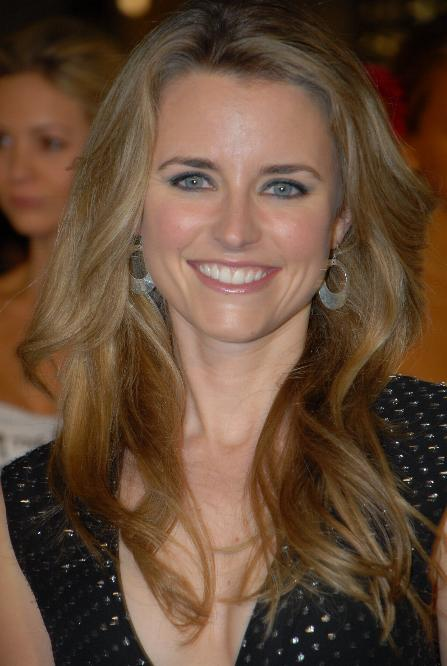
- Glover in 2008
- Born: Perth, Western Australia, Australia
- Education: University of Western Australia and Bristol University UK (BA); National Institute of Dramatic Art (GrDip) (2003)
- Occupation: Actress
- Years active: 2005–present
- Known for: The Starter Wife (2007); Righteous Kill (2008); Scream Queens (2008–2009)
- Spouse: Ian Brennan (m. 2016)
- Children: 2

Trilby Glover is an Australian actress known for her roles as Shoshanna in miniseries The Starter Wife, Jessica in 2008 film Righteous Kill, and Jane Hollis in comedy-horror series Scream Queens.

== Early life and education ==
Glover was born in Perth in Western Australia. She studied acting at Sydney's National Institute of Dramatic Art (NIDA), graduating in 2003, alongside actors Kate Box and Ian Roberts.

== Career ==
Glover had a small film role in 2005 comedy film Son of the Mask, before contributing regular voice work for 2007 animated Australian series I Got a Rocket!, together with Jamie Oxenbould and Drew Forsythe. That same year, she played the role of Shoshanna in the American miniseries The Starter Wife, alongside Debra Messing, which was filmed in Australia. She then appeared in Al Pacino-starring 2007 film thriller 88 Minutes.

After having caught the eye of The Starter Wife's director, Jon Avnet, Glover relocated to LA where in 2008, she worked with Al Pacino once more, as well as Robert De Niro in 2008 American crime thriller feature Righteous Kill. Beginning the same year, she secured a recurring role in the Starz network drama series Crash, making five appearances between 2008 and 2009.

Glover then appeared in 2010 Australian horror film Needle, opposite Michael Dorman, Travis Fimmel and Ben Mendelsohn, before landing the role of Margaret Hemmings-Welliington in 2011 made-for-television film William & Kate, chronicling the relationship of Prince William and Kate Middleton.

In 2014, Glover appeared opposite Jaime Pressly, Patrick Muldoon in TV horror film Finders Keepers. The following year she performed alongside Mayim Bialik in comedy-drama TV film The Flight Before Christmas, and played Tina in drama suspense film Kidnapped: The Hannah Anderson Story. Then in 2016, she landed the recurring role of Jane Hollis, a psychotic 65 year old, in the second season of Fox comedy-horror series Scream Queens. She later had a main role playing Cynthia, in the sci-fi horror film Threshold in 2019.

In 2022, Glover appeared in the Netflix series Dahmer – Monster: The Jeffrey Dahmer Story, alongside Evan Peters.

== Personal life ==
Glover married screenwriter Ian Brennan in September 2016 and the couple have two children.

== Filmography ==
Film
Year	Title	Role	Notes	Ref
2005	Son of the Mask	Dream Nurse		
2005	Soft	The Girl	Short film	
2007	88 Minutes	Defense Attorney Bennett		
2007	The Course	Olivia		
2007	The Changing Man	Lisa	Short film	
2008	Righteous Kill	Jessica		
2010	Needle	Isabel Du Pont		
2010	Chat noir	Cat (voice)	Short film	
2013	Heatwave	Trilby	Short film	
2013	Someone to Love	Marisol		
2014	Six Train	Alice	Short film	
2014	Actresses	Bitsy	Short film	
2014	Awkward Expressions of Love	Anna	Short film	
2014	You're a Natural	Shana	Short film	
2014	Oren	Lana	Short film	
2015	Mine	Clara	Short film	
2016	Library of Love	Isabelle	Short film	
2018	Tall Tales	Teresa	Short film	
2019	Threshold	Cynthia		
2019	Cookie	Gaby	Short film	
TBA	Talk to Me	The Girl	Short film	
TBA	All That Glisters	Cheryl	Short film	
TBA	Floored	Eleanor	Short film	
Television
Year	Title	Role	Notes	Ref
2006–2007	I Got a Rocket!	Gabby, Maya	38 episodes	
2007	The Starter Wife	Shoshanna	5 episodes	
2008–2009	Crash	Ann Finet		
2011	William & Kate: The Movie	Margaret Hemmings-Wellington	TV movie	
2012	The New Normal	Dede	1 episode	
2012	This American Housewife	Robin	TV movie	
2013	Schooled	Candace		
2014	Mistresses	Red-haired woman	1 episode	
2014	Finders Keepers	Kathy	TV movie	
2015	Glee	Carmel High Secretary	1 episode	
2015	The Flight Before Christmas	Courtney Carson	TV movie	
2015	Kidnapped: The Hannah Anderson Story	Tina Anderson	TV movie	
2016	Scream Queens	Jane Hollis	Season 2, 6 episodes	
2017	Tall Tales	Teresa	1 episode	
2017	The Chinaboy Show			
2018	There's a Special Place in Hell for Fashion Bloggers	Veronica	1 episode	
2022	Dahmer – Monster: The Jeffrey Dahmer Story	High School Guidance Counsellor	1 episode	
Theatre
Year	Title	Role	Notes	Ref
2005	In Rapture		Newtown Theatre, Sydney for Short+Sweet	
2005	Insular		Newtown Theatre, Sydney for Short+Sweet	
2005	Tape		Rechabite Hall, Perth with Capgun Productions	
2005	Matt & Ben		Darlinghurst Theatre, Sydney	
2006	The House of War		Seymour Centre, Sydney for Short+Sweet	
2007	Verbatim		Newtown Theatre, Sydney for Short+Sweet	

== Awards and nominations ==
Year	Work	Award	Category	Result	Ref
2016	Threshold	First Glance Film Festival	Best Actress	Nominated	
