= Hanna Mangan-Lawrence =

British-Australian actress

- Born: 5 March 1991 (age 35); London, England
- Occupation: Actress
- Years active: 2006–present
- Spouse: Omar Bustos (m. 2019)
- Children: 2

Hanna Mangan-Lawrence (born 5 March 1991) is an English-Australian actress. She is known in Australia for her role as Holly in the drama series Bed of Roses (2008–2011), for which she received an AFI Award nomination in 2008 and a Logie Award nomination in 2009, and internationally as Seppia in the Starz historical drama Spartacus: Vengeance (2012).

== Early life ==
Mangan-Lawrence was born in London to Maggie Mangan, an English teacher and playwright, and Ray Lawrence, a teacher, and grew up in Sydney. She has a half-sister Roisin, two half-brothers Liam and Reuben, a stepsister Zoe and stepmother Paddy, also a teacher.

Mangan-Lawrence represented Australia overseas as a member of the elite gymnastics team. In 2005, she won "Acrobat of the Year – International – Senior" at the Gymnastics Australia National Awards. In 2009, Mangan-Lawrence completed her high-school education at the Newtown High School of the Performing Arts through Pathways.

== Career ==
Mangan-Lawrence started her film career in 2005 with the short films Simulation 1201 and Galore. This was followed by a starring role in the short film Sexy Thing in 2006, which was accepted into the Cannes Film Festival.

Mangan-Lawrence was cast in the 2008 horror film Acolytes. She subsequently featured in The Square. She was nominated for a Filmink award for 'Best Australian Newcomer' for this performance.

In 2009, she appeared in the Australian period drama Lucky Country.

Mangan-Lawrence has featured in the Australian drama series Bed of Roses, which screened on the ABC television network. In 2008, she received an AFI Award nomination for "Best Guest or Supporting Actress in a Television Drama" for her role in Bed of Roses She was also nominated for the 'Graham Kennedy Award For Most Outstanding New Talent' at the Logie Awards in 2009.

In 2012, Mangan-Lawrence starred in the feature-film Thirst. She also became a recurring cast member on the Starz television series Spartacus: Vengeance.

In 2016, Mangan-Lawrence appeared in the limited series Containment.

== Personal life ==
Mangan-Lawrence married producer Omar Bustos in December 2018. They have a son, born 2019.

== Filmography ==
Film and television roles
Year	Title	Role	Notes
2006	Sexy Thing	Georgie	Short film
2008	Acolytes	Chasely	Film
2008	The Square	Lily	Film
2008–11	Bed of Roses	Holly Atherton	26 episodes
2009	Lucky Country	Sarah	Film
2009	Rescue: Special Ops	Tamsyn Taylor	Episode: "Deathbed"
2011	X: Night of Vengeance	Shay Ryan	Film
2011	Golden Girl	Wendy	Short film
2012	Thirst	Kit	Film
2012	Spartacus: Vengeance	Seppia	9 episodes
2014	Old School	Shannon Cahill	8 episodes
2014	The Reckoning	Rachel	Film
2015	Beyond the Reach	Laina	Film
2015	Point of Honor	Estella Rhodes	Unsold television pilot
2016	Containment	Teresa	13 episodes
2016	Red Dog: True Blue	Betty	Film
2019	Sweetheart	Mia	Film
