= Compo (film) =

- Directed by: Nigel Buesst
- Written by: Abe Pogos
- Based on: play Claim No. Z84 by Abe Pogos
- Starring: Jeremy Stanford
- Release date: 1989
- Running time: 83 minutes
- Country: Australia
- Language: English
- Budget: A$150,000

Compo is a 1989 low budget Australian film.

Buesst made it while running the St Kilda Film Festival.

== Premise ==
A man goes to work for the state compensation office.

== Cast ==
- Jeremy Stanford as Paul Harper
- Bruce Kerr as David Bartlett
- Christopher Barry as Carlo Garbanzo
- Elisabeth Crockett as Gina
- Cliff Neate as Dale Bradley
- Leo Regan as Eddie
- Peter Hosking as Vince Caruano

== Reception ==
The Tribune said the film "was mostly funny, but a little too long. Although it's a parody of the worst aspects of the public service, the portrayal of people with injuries as leeches on society did get a little annoying. Nonetheless, for a small budget, home-grown movie Nigel Buesst has done very well."

The Age said it "had a smattering of excellent on liners but is a narrative and satirical shambles and is further sullied by some dreadful miscasting."
