= Ryan McPartlin =

American actor (born 1975)

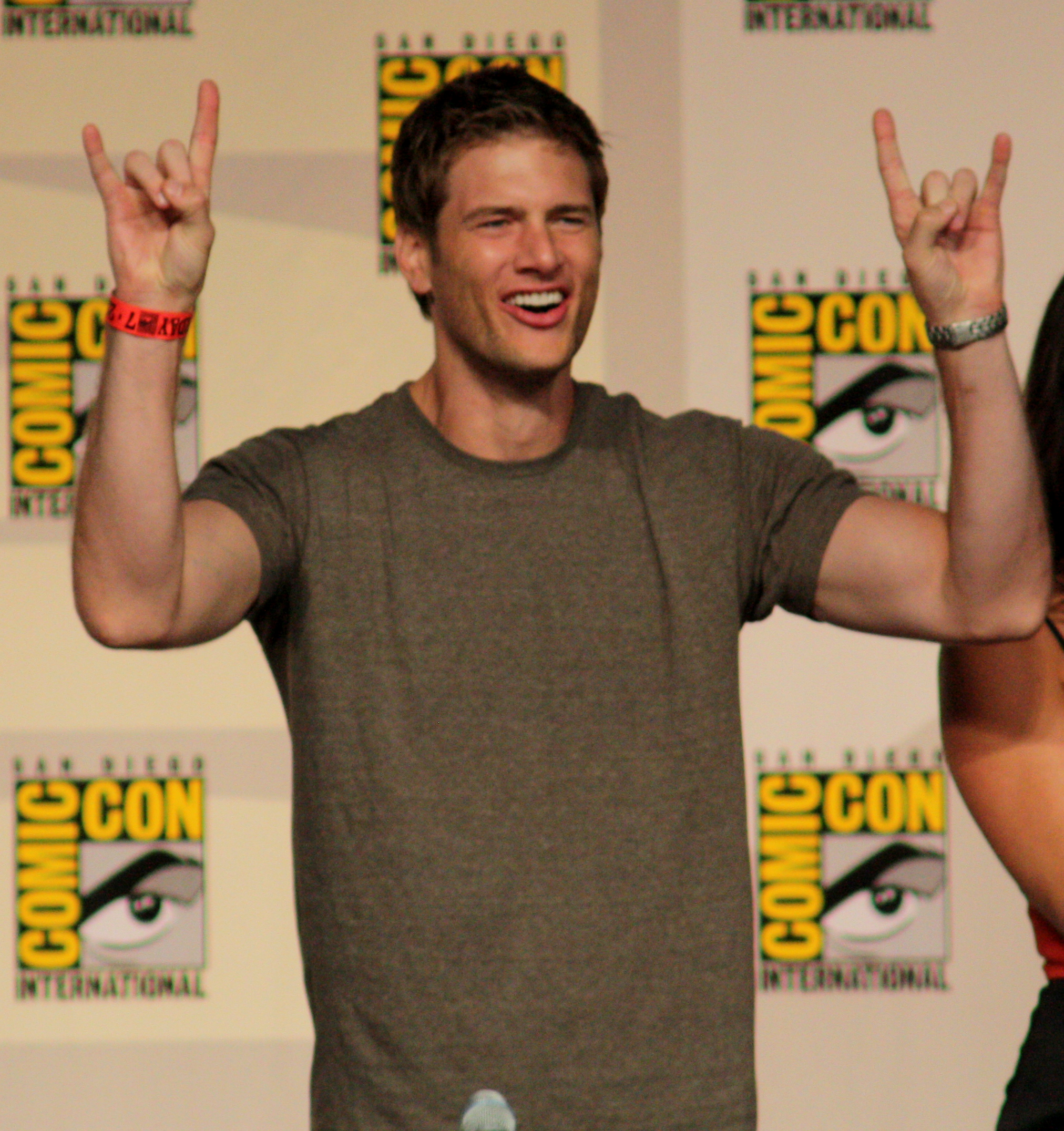
- McPartlin at San Diego Comic-Con in 2009
- Born: Ryan John McPartlin; July 3, 1975 (age 51); Chicago, Illinois, U.S.
- Education: Glenbard South High School - University of Illinois at Urbana–Champaign
- Occupation: Actor
- Years active: 1999–present
- Spouse: Danielle Kirlin (m. 2002)
- Children: 2

Ryan John McPartlin (born July 3, 1975) is an American actor, known for his role as Devon "Captain Awesome" Woodcomb on the action-comedy series Chuck.

== Early life ==
McPartlin was born in Chicago, Illinois, to Steve and Lois McPartlin. He was raised in Glen Ellyn, Illinois (a suburb of Chicago), and attended Glenbard South High School. McPartlin graduated with a degree in speech communication from the University of Illinois at Urbana–Champaign. He was a member of the Illinois Fighting Illini football team as a walk-on tight end from 1993 to 1995. McPartlin's older brother, Chris, was also a member of the Illinois football team, earning a varsity letter as a linebacker in 1994. After six months in Australia and New Zealand, McPartlin moved to Southern California to pursue acting as a career.

== Career ==
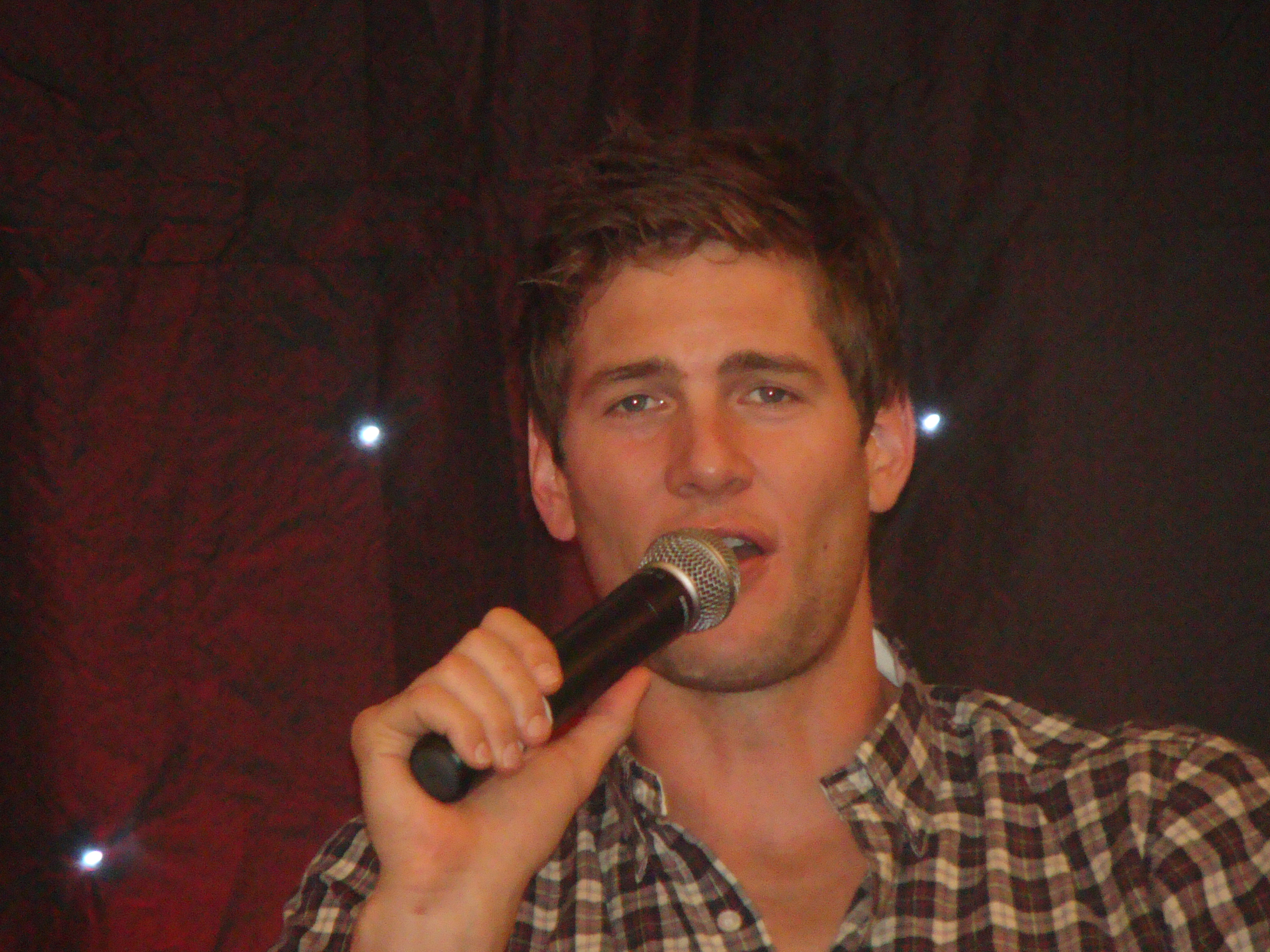
McPartlin at Starfury Conventions T3: "Rise of the Nerds" in June 2011

McPartlin spent years as an Abercrombie & Fitch model. McPartlin's first acting role was on The Nanny with Fran Drescher as a Leonardo DiCaprio-type character in a Titanic spoof. McPartlin has been mostly known for his role as Hank Bennett on the popular soap opera Passions replacing Dalton James from April 2001 until June 2004 and made a brief appearance in the series L.A. 7 as Ryan. McPartlin worked with Drescher again as Riley Martin on the television sitcom Living with Fran playing her much younger live-in boyfriend. Living with Fran was canceled on May 17, 2006, after two seasons. McPartlin originally auditioned for the role of Clark Kent/Superman in the film Superman Returns, but lost the role to Brandon Routh. In 2008, Ryan participated in Mad Men, playing an affair of January Jones's character, Betty Draper.

McPartlin also played Devon "Captain Awesome" Woodcomb on NBC's Chuck from 2007 to 2012. In mid-2010, McPartlin appeared in Sugarland's music video "Stuck Like Glue" as a man being stalked and abducted by lead singer Jennifer Nettles. McPartlin appears in commercials for Kate Walsh's perfume "Boyfriend". In March 2012, McPartlin began working with the website LiveLifeLocal to help promote active lifestyles and is filming a series of videos for the site. In 2014, he portrayed the recurring roles of police detective Dwayne Freeman on Mystery Girls and Billy the fireman on Bad Judge.

== Personal life ==
McPartlin is a certified personal trainer. He has been married to former actress Danielle Kirlin, whom he met at the University of Illinois, since October 26, 2002, and has two sons Wyatt and Dylan. McPartlin's hobbies include scuba diving, tennis, snowboarding, and racquetball.

== Filmography ==
=== Film ===
Year	Title	Role	Notes
2003	King of the Ants	Straff	
2006	The Shadow Effect	Chaz Martini	Short film
2009	Super Capers	Will Powers	
2010	Lego: The Adventures of Clutch Powers	Clutch Powers	Voice
2011	J. Edgar	Lawrence Richey	
2013	The Right Kind of Wrong	Danny Hart	
2015	You Cast a Spell on Me	Matt Andover	
2018	Hunter Killer	Matt Johnstone	
2021	A Clüsterfünke Christmas	Chancington Winterthorpe V	

=== Television ===
Year	Title	Role	Notes
1999	The Nanny	Performer #3	Episode: "Yetta's Letters"
1999	Odd Man Out	—N/a	Episode: "Batman Forever"
2000	L.A. 7	Ryan Sinclar	Episode: "Mr. Muscle"
2001	Three Sisters	Brad	Episode: "My Best Friend's Girl"
2001–2004	Passions	Hank Bennett	Contract: April 24, 2001 – April 2004; Recurring: April – June 18, 2004
2003	According to Jim	Bob	Episode: "No Harm, No Fowl"
2004	Still Standing	Jeremy	Episode: "Still Flirting"
2004	North Shore	William	Episode: "Secret Service"
2005	What I Like About You	Riley Martin	Episode: "Girls Gone Wild"
2005–2006	Living with Fran	Riley Douglas Martin	Main role
2006	Pepper Dennis	Grady Harper	Episode: "Charlie Babcock's Homosexual Encounter"
2007	CSI: NY	Terry Rockwell	Episode: "Obsession"
2007	Notes from the Underbelly	Hunter	Episode: "Mother's Milk"
2007–2012	Chuck	Devon Woodcomb	Recurring role (season 1); main role (seasons 2–5)
2008	Swingtown	Luke	Episode: "Friends with Benefits"
2009	Mad Men	Gentleman	Episode: "Meditations in an Emergency"
2009	Everything She Ever Wanted	Tom Allanson	Miniseries; 2 episodes
2011	Friends with Benefits	Evan Macklam	Episode: "The Benefit of the Right Track"
2011	Game Time: Tackling the Past	Jake Walker	Television film
2011	Community	Frisbee student #3	Episode: "Documentary Filmmaking: Redux"
2012	Hot in Cleveland	David	Episode: "Life with Lucci"
2012	CSI: Miami	Josh Avery	4 episodes
2012	Rizzoli & Isles	Dale Bowman	Episode: "Money Maker"
2012	Necessary Roughness	Ted	Episode: "Double Fault"
2012	Holly's Holiday	Bo	Television film
2013	I Hate My Teenage Daughter	Chris Reynolds	Episode: "Teenage Party"
2013–2014	Hart of Dixie	Carter Covington	4 episodes
2014	Chance at Romance	Heath Madsen	Hallmark Television film
2014	Playing House	Steve	Episode: "Totes Kewl"
2014	Friends with Better Lives	Sam	Episode: "Cyrano de Trainer-Zac"
2014	Mystery Girls	Detective Dwayne Freeman	5 episodes
2014	Sequestered	Ryan	Main role
2014	Bad Judge	Billy	2 episodes
2015	Babysitter's Black Book	Mark	Television film
2015	The Flight Before Christmas	Michael Nolan	Television film
2016	Fuller House	Tyler	Episode: "Mad Max"
2016	Devious Maids	Kyle	8 episodes
2016	Heaven Sent	Sean Miller	Television film
2017	Ghosted	Jace	Episode: "Lockdown"
2019–2020	L.A.'s Finest	Patrick McKenna	Main role
2019	Twinkle All the Way	Henry Harrison	Television film
2020	Once Upon a Main Street	Vic Manning	Television film
2021	All American	Manny	2 episodes
2021	Why Women Kill	Tom Madison	Episode: "Lady in the Lake"
2021	A Clusterfunke Christmas	Chancington Windmere	Television film
2021	The Holiday Fix Up	Coop	Television film
2022	Cut, Color, Murder	Kyle Crawford	Television film
2024	Monsters at Work	Bully Monster 1/Mr. April	Voice; Episode: "The C.R.E.E.P. Show"
2024	A Very Vermont Christmas	Zac Chase	Television film
2025	Double Scoop	James	Television film

=== Web ===
Year	Title	Role	Notes
2012	Daybreak	Eric	5 episodes

=== Music videos ===
Year	Title	Artist
2010	"Stuck Like Glue"	Sugarland
2015	"Give You What You Like"	Avril Lavigne
