= Needle (2010 film) =

- Theatrical film poster
- Directed by: John V. Soto
- Screenplay by: John V. Soto; Anthony Egan
- Produced by: Deidre Kitcher
- Starring: Michael Dorman; Jessica Marais; Travis Fimmel; Tahyna Tozzi; Trilby Glover; Ben Mendelsohn
- Cinematography: Stephen F. Windon
- Edited by: Jason Ballantine
- Music by: Jamie Blanks
- Production company: Filmscope Entertainment
- Distributed by: Lionsgate LLC
- Release dates: 9 October 2010 (Screamfest); 28 July 2011 (Australia)
- Running time: 90 minutes
- Country: Australia
- Language: English
- Budget: A$3 million

Needle (also known as Black Magic) is a 2010 Australian independent supernatural horror film directed by John V. Soto and starring Michael Dorman, Jessica Marais, Travis Fimmel, Trilby Glover, and Ben Mendelsohn. Needle is structured as a murder mystery, with six distinct clues pointing to one of ten suspects; the trailer is intentionally misleading.

Soto credits influences from such horror and mystery films as Hellraiser, Urban Legend, and I Know What You Did Last Summer.

== Plot ==
Ten years earlier, a man on a phone call is killed gruesomely, after the person at the other end of the line accuses him of stealing an important archaeological artifact.

Present time, college student Ben inherits a mysterious mechanical box called 'Le Vaudou Mort' from his father, who died two years earlier. He shows his friends Ryan, Nelson, Jed, Mary, Kandi and Isabel. Before leaving, Nelson takes a group photo. The following morning, Ben realises the box has gone missing. Nelson and Ryan ask their archaeology professor, Professor Banyon, about the box. She reveals that it was only used as a theatre prop, but agrees to alert them if she has any information.

That night, when Ryan is out on a run, an unknown person cuts his face from the photo that Nelson took and inserts it into the Le Vaudou Mort, confirming that it was stolen. The person then pulls a wax figure from the box and slashes it with hot needles. Ryan bleeds to death after gashes appear on his body. When the police find his body the next day, Ben's estranged brother Marcus, who was the crime scene photographer, immediately recognises him.

The next night, Nelson's face is cut from the photo and inserted in the box, before the limbs are torn from his wax figure and he dies from being dismembered gruesomely. Professor Banyon introduces Ben to archaeology expert Dr. Halmanay who tells him that the Le Vaudou Mort is a revenge apparatus. Isabel becomes the next victim, when the killer stabs needles in the wax figure's eyes.

After Marcus and Ben also discover Professor Banyon dead, they find out that their father, Samuel Rutherford stole the Le Vaudou Mort from his friend Robert Shaw ten years earlier. They conclude that the killer is exacting revenge on his sons and their friends. They head back to Isabel's house to warn their friends, only to find her body.

Marcus and Ben visit their old neighbourhood, where Robert Shaw died. Marcus ventures inside and finds the Le Vaudou Mort, before being knocked unconscious. Mary's mother calls Ben, informing him that she has not arrived home. Then Ben spots Kandi's car and finds Jed's body, his mouth slit from ear to ear. He goes inside to warn Marcus, only to be knocked out by Kandi.

It is revealed that Kandi is Robert Shaw's daughter and her father was killed by Ben and Marcus' father. She explains that she wanted Ben to feel what she felt when her father died, killing his friends first to prolong the agony. Mary has also been held captive and Ben is held at gunpoint. Kandi inserts Mary's picture into the La Vaudou Mort and begins to poke her wax figure. Ben stops Kandi, but she drags him outside. Mary frees herself and cuts Kandi's face from the picture, creating the wax figure. As Kandi attempts to kill Ben, holes appear in her chest, and she dies.

One month later, Marcus and Ben have reconciled and venture out on Marcus' boat to throw the Le Vaudou Mort into the ocean, so that noone will be victimised by it again.

== Cast ==
- Michael Dorman as Ben Rutherford
- Travis Fimmel as Marcus Rutherford
- Tahyna Tozzi as Mary Matthews
- Jessica Marais as Kandi
- Trilby Glover as Isabel Du Pont
- Chanel Marriott as Lucy
- Khan Chittenden as Jed
- Luke Carroll as Nelson
- Nathaniel Buzolic as Ryan
- Jane Badler as Professor Banyon
- John Jarratt as Paul the Coroner
- James Hagan as Samuel Rutherford
- Ben Mendelsohn as Detective Meares
- Malcolm Kennard as Detective Reddick
- Murray Bartlett as Tony Martin
- Quinton George as Mr Joshua
- Caroline McKenzie as Eliza Shaw
- Sam Longley as basketball coach
- Igor Sas as Dr. Halmanay

== Release and distribution ==
The film premiered at Cinefest OZ in August 2010, and has since screened at the British Horror Film Festival and Screamfest Horror Film Festival, as well as the Melbourne Underground Film Festival. Needle had a limited eight-screen release in Australian cinemas on 28 July 2011. The film also had a successful release in Turkey on 29 July 2011 where it opened at No.4 at the box office on 62 screens. Needle played for 13 weeks eventually grossing US$259,185. At 1 September 2012, Needle has been sold in 82 countries worldwide with rights for major territories going to Lionsgate (USA), High Fliers (UK), Telepool (Germany), Playarte (Brazil), SND (France), Shochiku (Japan) and Sony (Australia) Needle was made for $3m and filmed over six weeks in Perth, Western Australia. It had its Australian TV premiere on Saturday 12 December 2015 on Channel ONE (Network 10).

== Awards ==
Year	Award	Category	Result	Ref
2010	Screamfest (2010)	Best Horror Make-up Effects	Won	
2010	British Horror Film Festival	Best Cinematography	Won	
2010	British Horror Film Festival	Best Special Effects (by MEG FX)	Won	
2010	British Horror Film Festival	Best Supporting Actress (Jessica Marais)	Won	
2011	Melbourne Underground Film Festival	Best Cinematography (Stephen Windon)	Won	
2011	Melbourne Underground Film Festival	Best Actor (Michael Dorman)	Won	
2011	Melbourne Underground Film Festival	Special Jury Prize (Needle, John V. Soto)	Won	
2011	Melbourne Underground Film Festival	Best Poster Artwork	Won	

== See also ==
- Cinema of Australia
