= Crush (2009 Australian film) =

- Promotional poster
- Directed by: Jeffrey Gerritsen; John V. Soto
- Written by: John V. Soto
- Produced by: Michael Favelle; Deidre Kitcher; Ray Meadowcroft; Andrew Morgan
- Starring: Christopher Egan; Emma Lung; Brooke Harman; Christian Clark
- Cinematography: Richard Malins
- Edited by: Jason Ballantine
- Music by: Jamie Blanks
- Distributed by: Paramount Pictures
- Release date: April 2009
- Running time: 82 minutes
- Country: Australia
- Language: English

Crush is a 2009 Australian supernatural thriller film directed by Jeffrey Gerritsen and John V. Soto. It stars Christopher Egan as Julian, an American martial arts champ house sitting a luxury home in Perth. Julian's life unravels when he cheats on his girlfriend, Clare (Brooke Harman) with Anna (Emma Lung). It was released in Australia in April 2009. It was released on DVD in North America on 14 July 2010.

== Plot ==
An international architecture student at University of Western Australia and martial arts champ, Julian finds work as a house sitter for the wealthy owners of a luxury home in Perth. His new job causes friction with his girlfriend Clare, who he was supposed to live with. The house and wealth it exudes open up a realm of opportunities for Julian, and he is seduced by the mysterious and attractive Anna. As time goes on, Anna becomes obsessive of Julian. Subsequently, his relationship with Clare falls apart, and he struggles to regain momentum in a martial arts championship. His academic life is threatened when his final university assignment disappears. When he speaks to the owner of the house, he mentions meeting the niece but is told that's impossible as she is away, and the name "Anna" gets a furious reaction. He asks a neighbour to shed some light on the conversation and it is revealed that a junkie died after getting into the house and falling down the stairs. He recognises Anna in the news photo. When she returns, he acknowledges that she is a ghost; her beautiful form turns into a monstrous banshee and tries to force him to kill himself so they can be together. Julian attempts to flee, but Anna traps him in the house, forcing him to hide. His friends and girlfriend come to check on him but are too late. Anna ambushes Julian and asks why he doesn't love her, in his last words he responds, "I'll never love you." just before the banshee pushes him down the stairs to his death, just like her when she was alive. Julian recovers in a hospital bed where a nurse is attending him. As she asks him who he would like to see, Julian asks for Clare. The nurse replies that he's answered incorrectly, revealing the silhouetted nurse to be none other than Anna and Julian is in fact dead. As the film ends, Anna promises to "take care" of Clare whilst kissing Julian in the afterlife.

== Cast ==
- Christopher Egan as Julian
- Emma Lung as Anna
- Brooke Harman as Clare
- Christian Clark as Wesley
- Jenna Lind as Logan
- Kane Manera as Phil
- Elwyn Edwards as Professor

== Production ==
The film was shot in Western Australia, primarily in Perth. The area offered financial incentives according to the producer. Filming locations included South Perth, Perry Lakes Reserve, University of Western Australia and West Perth.

== Soundtrack ==
- "Waiting All Day" – Silverchair
- "Ordinary Life" – Kristen Barry
- "Vampire Racecourse" – The Sleepy Jackson
- "Cigarettes and Suitcases" – Something for Kate
- "Animal, I'm Carrying" – Ravior
- "Last Resort" – Papa Roach
- "Bodies" – Little Birdy
- "Crazy" – Cordrazine
- "Everything" – Shihad

== Reception ==
The film received a generally positive reaction from Australian cinema magazine, Filmink. "Crush delivers most of what it sets out to do. A busy soundtrack enhances the experience (itself a rarity), while muscular production and the eye candy appeal of Egan and Lung (the film's biggest asset) push proceedings a notch or two above similar movies. [...] it's all handled with enough flair to make the popcorn experience worthwhile."

== See also ==
- Cinema of Australia
