= John V. Soto =

Australian film director

- Occupation: Film director

John V. Soto is an Australian film director and co-founder of Filmscope Entertainment, a production company based in Western Australia that focuses on commercial genre films.

== Career ==
Soto won Best Director for his film The Reckoning at the 2014 British Independent Film Festival, where the film had its UK premiere at Leicester Square on 9 May 2014. He has written and directed several feature films, including Crush (2009), starring Christopher Egan; Needle (2010), starring Travis Fimmel and Ben Mendelsohn; and The Reckoning (2014), starring Jonathan LaPaglia and Luke Hemsworth. The Reckoning premiered at CinefestOZ on 29 August 2014 and was released in Australia on 5 September 2014. The film had its Australian TV premiere on 7 December 2015 on Channel One (Network Ten).

Soto also directed the sci-fi thriller The Gateway (2017), starring Jacqueline McKenzie. The film was selected for the FilmQuest and Austin Revolution festivals in 2017, winning Best Feature Director at the latter, as well as receiving nominations for Best Film, Best Cinematography, and Best Screenplay.

In 2010, Soto wrote and directed Needle, a supernatural thriller starring Ben Mendelsohn, Trilby Glover, and Michael Dorman. The film was distributed internationally through a partnership with Lightning Entertainment. Needle was released in Turkey, where it reached no. 4 at the box office on 29 July 2011, running for 13 weeks. The film was acquired by Sony for Australia and had a limited theatrical release before its home entertainment release. Needle won several awards, including Best Cinematography and Best Special Effects at the British Horror Film Festival, and Best Makeup Special Effects at Screamfest and the Melbourne Underground Film Festival, where Soto also won the Special Jury Prize.

Soto's 2009 film Crush, which he wrote and co-directed, was sold in 54 countries. He also wrote the script for Prey (2009) and directed the 2007 short film Repulsion.

== Filmography ==
Year	Title	Role	Format	Status
2007	Repulsion	director	Short Film	Completed
2009	Crush	writer, director	Feature	Released
2010	Needle	writer, director	Feature	Released
2014	The Reckoning	writer, director	Feature	Released
2017	The Gateway	writer, director	Feature	Released
2022	Avarice	writer, director	Feature	Released

== Awards and nominations ==
Attributed awards in film
Year	Film	Festival	Award nomination	Result
2011	Needle	Melbourne Underground Film Festival (2011)	Special Jury Prize	Won
2014	The Reckoning	The British Independent Film Festival (2014)	Best Director	Won
