= The Reckoning (2014 film) =

- Film poster
- Directed by: John V. Soto
- Written by: John V. Soto
- Produced by: Deidre Kitcher
- Starring: Luke Hemsworth; Viva Bianca; Jonathan LaPaglia; Hanna Mangan-Lawrence; Alex Williams
- Cinematography: Jason Thomas
- Edited by: Regg Skwarko
- Music by: Thomas Rouch
- Production company: Reckoning Productions
- Release date: 21 August 2014
- Country: Australia
- Language: English

The Reckoning is an Australian crime thriller feature film written and directed by John V. Soto and starring Luke Hemsworth, Viva Bianca, Jonathan LaPaglia, Hanna Mangan-Lawrence, and Alex Williams. The film premiered at the British Independent Film Festival in London on 10 May 2014, where it won Best Director and Best Music.

== Synopsis ==
When Detective Robbie Green (Jonathan LaPaglia) is called in to investigate the murder of his colleague Jason Pearson (Luke Hemsworth), he discovers at the crime scene a SD card from a video camera. The card contains footage shot by two runaway teenagers, Rachel (Hanna Mangan-Lawrence) and AJ (Alex Williams), who are making a documentary about the drug related death of Rachel's sister.

Robbie and Detective Jane Lambert (Viva Bianca) start to retrace the teen's journey and soon the pair begin to uncover a trail of the dead. Video footage reveals Jason being connected to the drug operation and he later gives Robbie up as being involved in the death of Rachel's sister.

Robbie is discharged from the investigation and sent home late at night, only to find his family being held hostage by AJ and Rachel. After a gunfight, and with the police approaching the home, Rachel takes Robbie up onto the roof at gunpoint, with nothing but revenge on her mind.

== Cast ==
The cast includes:

- Luke Hemsworth as Detective Jason Pearson
- Viva Bianca as Detective Jane Lambert
- Jonathan LaPaglia as Detective Robbie Green
- Hanna Mangan-Lawrence as Rachel Saunders
- Alex Williams as Andrew "AJ" Jamison
- Tom O'Sullivan as Connor
- Amanda Dow as Maxine
- Chelsea Williamson as Abbie Saunders
- Kelsie Anderson as Sarah
- Renato Fabretti as Alex
- Katie Dorman as Renee
- Priscilla-Anne Forder as Officer Sally Franklin

== Production ==
The Reckoning was written and directed by John V. Soto,

Filming took place in Perth, Western Australia.

== Release ==
The world premiere of The Reckoning was held at the British Independent Film Festival at the Empire, Leicester Square in London, on 10 May 2014. The film made its Australian premiere at CinefestOz on 23 August and had a limited national release across five Australian cinemas, two in Perth and one each in Sydney, Melbourne and Brisbane on 5 September.

The thriller opened in limited release in Sydney, Melbourne, Brisbane and Perth on 5 September 2014 following their Australian premiere at CinefestOz on 29 August 2014. The film was officially selected to screen in Cannes 15 May 2015 as part of the Antipodes collection for Cannes Cinephiles. The Reckoning was produced by Filmscope Entertainment's Deidre Kitcher. It had its Australian TV Premiere on 7 December 2015 on Network TEN.

Lightning Entertainment has sold The Reckoning in over 40 overseas markets, including Portugal (Media Page), the USA (Anchor Bay/Starz), South Africa (Ster Kinekor), Scandinavia (Atlantic Films), Turkey (Movie Box), Korea (SB), the Middle East (Eagle Entertainment), Mexico (Renaissance) and Thailand (IPA).

== Reception ==
The Reckoning has received mainly positive reviews from the media. Gavin Bond of the Perth newspaper The Sunday Times praised the film as "an accomplished, refreshingly gritty and thoroughly entertaining thriller." Philippa Hawker from The Age stated that The Reckoning was "an intriguing thriller that interweaves two accounts of guilt and revelation". Andrew Urban from Urban Cinefile said, "A strong screenplay, coupled with an interesting cinematic structure and great images make this an engaging film with tension and texture." Who Weekly's Andiee Pavious remarked that "From seemingly foreseeable beginnings, his (John V. Soto) deceptive screenplay ricochets through a bloodied thicket of hoops that one by one call everyone's integrity to account. Prepare to be unprepared." Erin Free from Filmink lauded the film, saying "Writer/Director John V. Soto delivers his best film yet with this tight, taut and compelling thriller".

== Awards and nominations ==
Year	Festival	Award Nomination	Result
2014	British Independent Film Festival	Best Director	Won
2014	British Independent Film Festival	Best Music	Won
