= Jonathan LaPaglia =

Australian actor (born 1969)

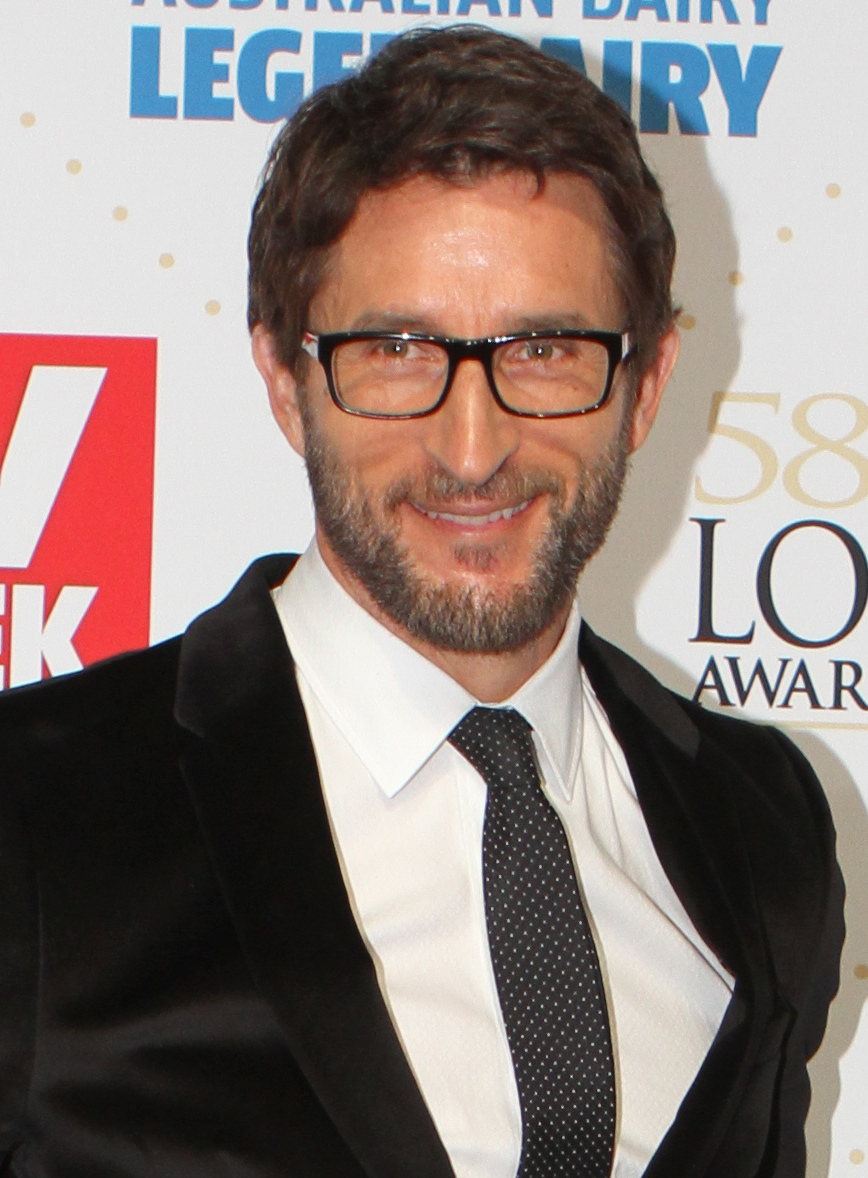
- LaPaglia in May 2016
- Born: 31 August 1969 (age 57); Adelaide, South Australia, Australia
- Education: University of Adelaide
- Occupations: Actor; model
- Years active: 1996–present
- Spouse: Ursula Brooks (m. 1998)
- Children: 1
- Relatives: Anthony LaPaglia (brother)

Jonathan LaPaglia (/ləˈpɑːliə/ lə-PAH-lee-ə, Italian: [laˈpaʎʎa]; born 31 August 1969) is an Australian actor and television personality. He hosted Network 10's revival of Australian Survivor from 2016 to 2025. As an actor, LaPaglia is known for his roles as Frank B. Parker in the television series Seven Days, Kevin Debreno in The District and Detective Tommy McNamara in New York Undercover.

== Early and personal life ==
LaPaglia was born in Adelaide, South Australia, the youngest of three sons of Maria Johannes (née Brendel), a secretary, originally from the Netherlands and Gedio "Eddie" LaPaglia, an auto mechanic and car dealer from Bovalino, Calabria, Italy. Actor Anthony LaPaglia is one of his elder brothers. LaPaglia lives in Santa Monica, California, with his wife Ursula Brooks and daughter.

== Career ==
LaPaglia graduated from Rostrevor College, and then from the University of Adelaide with a MBBS medical degree in 1991. He worked three years as an emergency ward physician in Adelaide, Sydney and London. Feeling restricted, he decided to follow his brother into acting. In 1994, he moved to New York City where he joined the Circle in the Square Theatre School. He got his first break in 1996 when he joined the cast of the television series New York Undercover.

From 1998 until 2001, he played the role of Lt. Frank B. Parker on the science fiction series Seven Days. Afterwards, he played Detective Kevin Debreno, on The District from 2001–2004. LaPaglia has also guest-starred in numerous series including The Sopranos, NCIS, Cold Case and Castle. He appeared in the May 2008 issue of Car Craft magazine with his custom 6.1L Hemi '73 Dodge Challenger.

In 2011, he starred as the protagonist, Hector, in the TV adaptation of Christos Tsiolkas' novel The Slap produced for ABC TV. Although he is Australian, this was LaPaglia's first appearance in an Australian production. Having lived abroad for many years, LaPaglia found it necessary to hire a dialect coach to recover his Australian accent. His second role in an Australian production was the title character of real-life crime boss Anthony "Rooster" Perish in Channel Nine's Underbelly: Badness, which was the fifth series of the true crime drama franchise. He starred in the 2014 movie The Reckoning alongside Luke Hemsworth.

Since 2016, he has been the host of Network 10's revival of Australian Survivor. In 2020, he was 'inducted' by the "Australian Survivor Archive" fansite into the "Inaugural Australian Survivor Hall of Fame". LaPaglia is also a sports enthusiast and model.

In October 2023, it was confirmed that he would be one of three hosts, alongside Beau Ryan and Blair Joscelyne, on a reboot of Top Gear Australia for Paramount Plus.

In June 2025, it was announced that he would be replaced as host of Australian Survivor. His final season of the show was Australian Survivor: Australia V The World, and it aired in 2025.

== Filmography ==
=== Film ===
Year	Title	Role	Notes
1997	Deconstructing Harry	First assistant cameraperson	
1998	Origin of the Species	Stan	
2000	Under Hellgate Bridge	Vincent	
2008	Jack Rio	Devon Russel	
2008	A Beautiful Life	Vince	
2011	The Hit List	Detective Neil McKay	Direct-to-video
2013	Pioneer	Ronald	
2014	The Reckoning	Detective Robbie Green	Also associate producer
2016	The Secrets of Emily Blair	Dr Bogan	
2019	Ford v Ferrari	Eddie	

=== Television ===
Year	Title	Role	Notes
1996–1997	New York Undercover	Tommy McNamara	Main role (season 3)
1998	Law & Order	Frank Russo	Episode: "Grief"
1998–2001	Seven Days	Cmdr. Frank Parker	Main role
1998	Inferno	Eddie	Television film
2001–2004	The District	Det. Kevin Debreno	Main role (seasons 2–4); Director; episode: "The Black Widow Maker"
2002	The Agency	Det. Kevin Debreno	Episode: "Doublecrossover"
2004	Plain Truth	Cooper	Television film
2004	The Dead Will Tell	Billy Hytner	Television film
2006	Windfall	Dave Park	8 episodes
2006	Law & Order: Criminal Intent	Jack McCaskin	Episode: "Tru Love"
2007	Gryphon	Prince Seth of Delphi	Television film
2007	The Sopranos	Michael the Cleaver	Episodes: "Stage 5"
2007	The Sopranos	Himself	Episodes: "Kennedy and Heidi"
2008	NCIS	Special Agent Brent Langer	2 episodes
2008	Moonlight	Jackson Monaghan	Episode: "Sonata"
2008	Bones	Anton Deluca	Episode: "The Skull in the Sculpture"
2008–2010	Cold Case	ADA Curtis Bell	10 episodes
2009	Castle	John Knox	Episode: "Love Me Dead"
2010	Burn Notice	Coleman	Episode: "Good Intentions"
2011	Final Sale	James Dolan	Television film
2011	The Slap	Hector	Main role
2012	Underbelly: Badness	Anthony "Rooster" Perish	Main role
2013	Camp	Steve	2 episodes
2014–2016	Love Child	Dr Patrick McNaughton	Main role (series 1–3)
2014	The Mentalist	John Acardo	Episode: "Il Tavolo Bianco"
2016–2025	Australian Survivor	Himself (host)	Season 3–Season 13
2018	S.W.A.T.	Machine	Episode: "Crews"
2023-present	Strife	Peter	4 episodes
2024	Top Gear Australia	Himself (host)	Season 5

Media offices
Preceded by Ian "Dicko" Dickson	Host of Australian Survivor; 2016–2025	Succeeded by David Genat
