= The Flight Before Christmas (2015 film) =

2015 television film directed by Peter Sullivan

- Written by: Jennifer Notas Shapiro
- Directed by: Peter Sullivan
- Starring: Mayim Bialik; Ryan McPartlin; Reginald VelJohnson; Jo Marie Payton; Trilby Glover; Candice Azzara; Rob Mathes; Roxana Ortega; Brian Doyle-Murray
- Country of origin: United States
- Original language: English

Production
- Producers: Jeffrey Schenck; Brian Nolan; Barry Barnholtz
- Cinematography: Stuart Brereton
- Running time: 120 minutes

Original release
- Network: Lifetime
- Release: December 5, 2015

The Flight Before Christmas is a 2015 American Christmas television film directed by Peter Sullivan. It was released on December 5, 2015. The film stars Mayim Bialik and Ryan McPartlin as two people whose flight home for Christmas is diverted, leaving them to spend the holidays together.

== Plot ==
As Stephanie (Mayim Bialik) prepares to move in with her boyfriend (Gib Gerard), he breaks up with her, leaving her heartbroken and homeless for the holidays until she decides to fly home to Connecticut. On a red-eye the day before Christmas Eve, Stephanie finds herself seated next to Michael (Ryan McPartlin), who is planning to propose to his long-term girlfriend. Stephanie and Michael argue with one another over relationship skills before the pilot announces that an unexpected snowstorm is crossing the country. Their flight is diverted to Bozeman in Montana where Stephanie takes the last available room at the town's bed and breakfast. Despite their differences, she offers to share the room with Michael where they try to get along and end up realizing that they are becoming attracted to each other. Not wanting to interfere with Michael's relationship, Stephanie sneaks out to the airport and leaves without telling him. He soon discovers her absence and immediately follows her to the airport. The two say goodbye before her flight. Michael later breaks up with his girlfriend and searches for Stephanie online to reconnect with her.

On New Year's Eve, Michael calls Stephanie's office to hear her voice on her message. Stephanie visits his social media page. Missing each other and hoping to meet again, they each go to a local New Year's party. The two share a kiss after the New Year's countdown.

== Cast ==
- Mayim Bialik as Stephanie Michelle Hunt
- Ryan McPartlin as Michael Nolan
- Reginald VelJohnson as Joe
- Jo Marie Payton as Marie
- Brian Doyle-Murray as Noel Nichols
- Trilby Glover as Courtney Carson
- Candice Azzara as Debbie
- Rob Mathes as Sean
- Roxana Ortega as Kate
- Carol Mack as Dolores
- Gib Gerard as Brian
