= Michael Dorman =

New Zealand actor

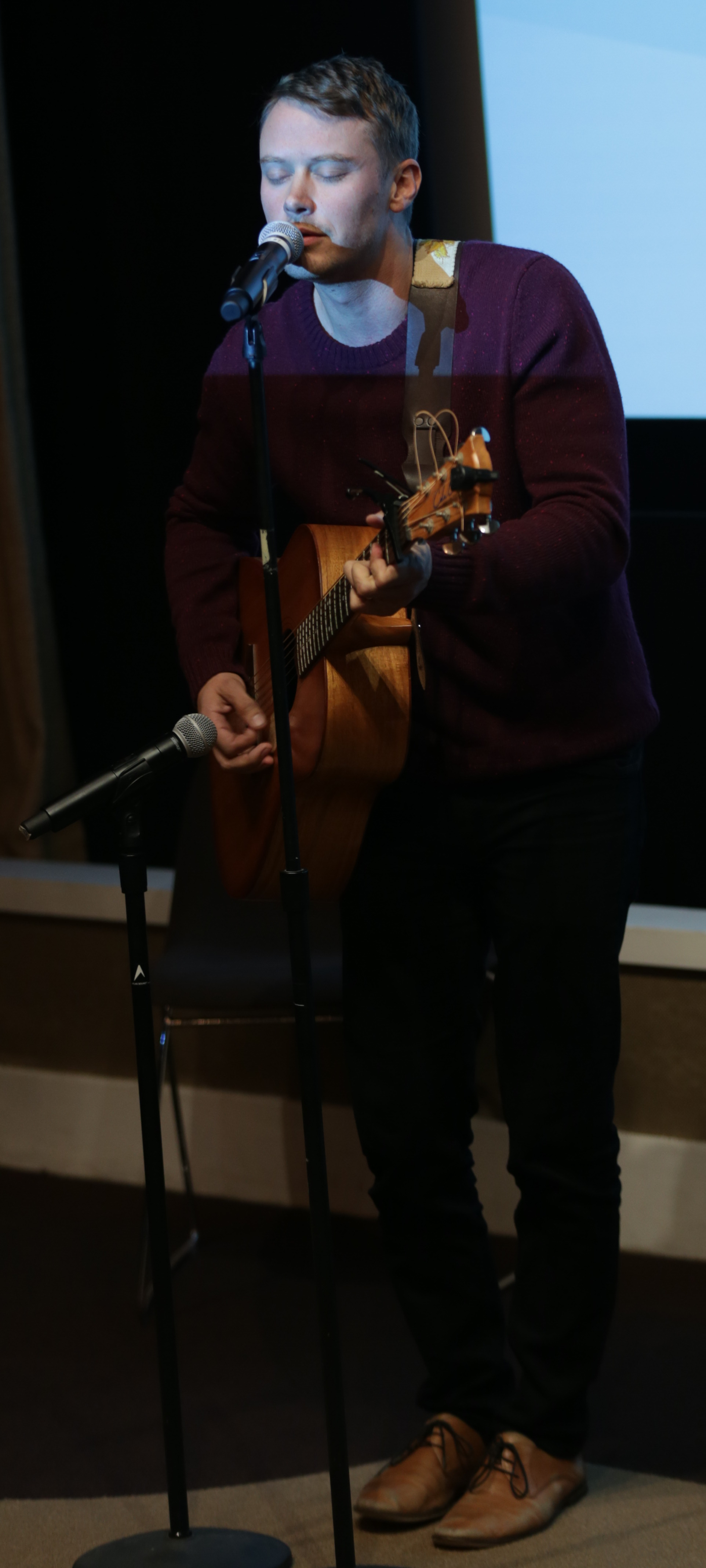
- Dorman in 2017
- Born: Auckland, New Zealand
- Education: Bundaberg State High School; Queensland University of Technology
- Occupation: Actor
- Years active: 2001–present

Michael Dorman is a New Zealand-born Australian actor. He is best known for his starring roles as Tom Wilcox in Wonderland (2013–2015), John Tavner in Patriot (2015–2018), NASA astronaut Gordo Stevens in For All Mankind (2019–2021; 2026), and the title character in Joe Pickett (2021–2023).

== Early life and education ==
Michael Dorman was born in Auckland, New Zealand. His mother's side of the family is Māori (specifically, Ngāti Porou people from the east coast of North Island), and his father's ancestors are Pākehā. (Note: The Māori term for non-Māori, but most commonly applied to New Zealanders of European descent.)

He moved to Australia with his family at the age of ten, and settled in Bundaberg, Queensland, where he attended Bundaberg State High School. He subsequently studied for a degree in drama at the Queensland University of Technology in Brisbane.

== Career ==
Dorman's first role was as Christian on The Secret Life of Us. He was a fan of the show when it premiered in 2001 and he was in his final year of university. He landed the role in 2002 after having moved to Sydney.

One of Dorman's breakthrough performances came in the Australian film Suburban Mayhem (2006). Other lead roles followed in the Australian films Prime Mover (2009) and Needle (2010), as well as supporting work on further Australian films such as West (2007), Acolytes (2008), Triangle (2009), Daybreakers (2009) and Killer Elite (2011). He also featured in a main role as Tom Wilcox in the Australian television comedy-drama Wonderland for the entirety of its run (2013–2015).

After befriending Russell Crowe while working on The Water Diviner (2014), Crowe paid for Dorman's flight to the United States to further his acting career there. He picked up significant roles in TV series For All Mankind and Patriot, and a small role in blockbuster film Pirates of the Caribbean: Dead Men Tell No Tales (2017).

He returned to Australia and was living there as of 2018.

Dorman went on to star as Tom Griffin in the horror film The Invisible Man and as Jesse in Hard Luck Love Song (both 2020).

In 2021, it was announced that he would star as the title character of the American TV series Joe Pickett, based on the books by C. J. Box. The show premiered for viewing on the Spectrum Network in December 2021 and Paramount+ streaming service in February 2022.

He was cast as Gol D. Roger in the 2023 Netflix series One Piece, US/UK/Japan co-production, and played Graham Lawson in the 2024 Netflix Australian series Territory. On 20 November 2025, Dorman was announced for ABC television series Treasure & Dirt in the lead role.

== Music ==
Dorman is also a musician. He has performed live, supporting musicians such as Alex Lloyd, The Beautiful Girls, and Abbe May, as well as at festivals, including Peats Ridge, Woodford, and Homebake Festivals.

== Recognition and awards ==
Dorman was nominated for a Silver Logie for Best Lead Actor in a Drama at the 2025 Logie Awards, for his performance in Territory.

== Filmography ==
=== Film ===
Year	Title	Role	Notes
2001	Spudmonkey	Trent	
2005	50 Ways of Saying Fabulous	Jamie	
2006	Suburban Mayhem	Rusty	
2007	West	Mick	
2008	Acolytes	Gary Parker	
2009	Prime Mover	Thomas	
2009	Triangle	Greg	
2009	Daybreakers	Frankie Dalton	
2010	Needle	Ben Rutherford	
2011	Killer Elite	Jake	
2011	Sleeping Beauty	Cook	
2012	The Weight of Sunken Treasure	Michael Dooley (young)	Short film
2014	The Water Diviner	Greeves	
2016	Goldstone	Patch	
2017	Pirates of the Caribbean: Dead Men Tell No Tales	First Officer Wade	
2020	The Invisible Man	Tom Griffin	
2020	Hard Luck Love Song	Jesse	

=== Television ===
Year	Title	Role	Notes
2002–2005	The Secret Life of Us	Christian Hayden	Main cast
2005	Small Claims: White Wedding	Sean	Television film
2006	The Silence	Eddison	Television film
2011	Sea Patrol	Travis	Episode: "The Hunted"
2011	Rescue: Special Ops	Will Pike	Episode: "True Romance"
2011	Wild Boys	Dan Sinclair	10 episodes
2011	Blood Brothers	Jeff Gillham	Television film
2012	Underbelly: Badness	Paul Leaske	Episode: "Strike Force Tuno"
2013	The Time of Our Lives	Joel	3 episodes
2013	Reef Doctors	Scottie	Episode #1.11
2013	Serangoon Road	Conrad Harrison	Miniseries, 10 episodes
2013–2015	Wonderland	Tom Wilcox	44 episodes
2015–2018	Patriot	John Tavner	18 episodes
2016	Black Comedy	Guest Cast	Episode #2.6
2019–2021; 2026	For All Mankind	Gordo Stevens	21 episodes
2020	The Secrets She Keeps	Jack O'Shaughnessy	6 episodes
2021–2023	Joe Pickett	Joe Pickett	20 episodes
2023-	One Piece	Gol D. Roger	2 episodes
2024	Territory	Graham Lawson	6 episodes
2026	Treasure & Dirt	Ivan Lucic	TV series
2026	The Good Daughter	Ben	Main cast

== Theatre ==
Year	Title	Role	Notes
2000	Come Back to the 5 & Dime, Jimmy Dean, Jimmy Dean	Joe	QUT
2001	The Taming of the Shrew	Lucentio	QUT
2001	The Art of Success	Frank	QUT
2001	48 Shades of Brown	Dan	La Boite Theatre Company
