= Ben Hackworth =

Australian writer and film director (born 1977)

- Born: July 12, 1977 (age 48); Brisbane, Queensland, Australia
- Occupations: Director, writer, producer
- Years active: 2001–present

Ben Hackworth (born 12 July 1977) is an Australian writer and film director. He is best known for his work on the films Martin Four, Corroboree and Celeste.

== Biography ==
Ben was born in Brisbane, Queensland. His father is retired Colonel David Hackworth. He studied at Amherst College in the United States, before returning to Australia to complete a Masters of Film at Victorian College of the Arts. In 2005, he completed a Masters of Film with his script for a feature film called The Serpent. In 2006, he was accepted into the prestigious Cannes Film Festival residence to develop this project in Paris.

He has created several award-winning short films, including:

- Martin Four (2001); official selection Cannes Film Festival, 2001
- Violet Lives Upstairs (2003); winner of Film Critics Circle of Australia, 2003, award for Best Short Film

In 2007, he released his debut feature-length film, Corroboree, which has been selected at Berlin, Toronto, Sydney, Melbourne, Brisbane and Perth International Film Festivals.

His most recent film Celeste, starring Radha Mitchell, Thomas Cocquerel, Nadine Garner and Odessa Young had its world premiere at Melbourne International Film Festival, international premiere at BFI London Film Festival and was selected for competition at Santa Barbara International Film Festival.

== Filmography ==
Year	Film	Writer	Director	Producer	Notes
2001	Martin Four	✓	✓	✓	Short Film
2001	Murder Landscapes	✓	✓	✓	Short Film
2002	Half Sister	✓	✓	✓	TV series
2003	Violet Lives Upstairs	✓	✓	✗	Short Film
2007	Corroboree	✓	✓	✗	Feature Film
2018	Celeste	✓	✓	✗	Feature Film
