= Thomas Cocquerel =

Australian actor

- Born: Thomas Michel Cocquerel; 5 September 1989 (age 37); Sydney, New South Wales, Australia
- Occupation: Actor
- Years active: 2013–present
- Family: Emilie Cocquerel (sister); Elsa Cocquerel (sister); Anna Cocquerel (sister)

Thomas Michel Cocquerel (born 5 September 1989) is an Australian actor. On television, he is known for his roles in the HBO Max series The Gilded Age (2022), the SBS series Safe Home, the Paramount+ series Paper Dolls (both 2023) and the Peacock series All Her Fault (2025). His films include OtherLife (2017), Billionaire Boys Club, Celeste, In Like Flynn (2018), and The Divorce Party (2019).

== Early life ==
Cocquerel was born in Sydney to French father Patrick and Australian mother Georgia. His younger sisters Emilie, Elsa, and Anna are also actors. He spent his early childhood in Spain, France, and the United States before returning to Sydney in 2001, settling in the North Shore suburb of Warrawee. He attended the Sydney Church of England Grammar School (colloquially known as the Shore School). He went on to graduate from the National Institute of Dramatic Art (NIDA) in 2012.

== Career ==
In 2014, Cocquerel made his television debut in an episode of Love Child as well as the miniseries Anzac Girls. He made his feature film debut the following year in Daniel Alfredson's crime drama Kidnapping Freddy Heineken. This was followed by further film roles in the family film Red Dog: True Blue in 2016 and the comedy Table 19, the sports drama 1 Mile to You, and the coming-of-age drama The Tribes of Palos Verdes in 2017. That year, he had his first starring role in the science fiction film OtherLife alongside Jessica De Gouw.

In 2018, Cocquerel portrayed actor Errol Flynn in the biographical film In Like Flynn and starred alongside Radha Mitchell in Celeste, directed by Ben Hackworth and filmed in Far North Queensland on location at Paronella Park. The latter film screened in competition at the Adelaide Film Festival the BFI London Film Festival. Cocquerel also appeared in true crime film Billionaire Boys Club and was cast in an attempted reboot of American crime drama Get Christie Love!, but the pilot did not proceed to series.

Cocquerel joined the recurring cast of the CW series The 100 for its sixth season as Ryker Desai IX. He led the 2019 romantic comedy film The Divorce Party. Also that year, Cocquerel was cast in Escape Room: Tournament of Champions, the 2021 sequel to the psychological thriller film Escape Room. Cocquerel appeared as lawyer Tom Raikes in the first season of Julian Fellowes' period drama The Gilded Age on HBO Max.

On 18 August 2024, Cocquerel was announced as part of the cast for Peacock series All Her Fault.

== Filmography ==
=== Film ===
Year	Title	Role	Notes
2013	Walk Right In	Barlow Blair	Short film
2015	Kidnapping Freddy Heineken	Martin "Brakes" Erkamps	
2015	Campdraft	Man	Short film
2016	Red Dog: True Blue	Bill Stemple	
2017	Table 19	Huck	
2017	1 Mile to You	Rye Bledsoe	
2017	OtherLife	Danny	
2017	The Tribes of Palos Verdes	Mildew	
2018	Everyone Is Doing Great	Oliver Westlake	Short film
2018	Ward One	Man	Short film
2018	Billionaire Boys Club	Charlie Bottoms	
2018	The Big Break	Officer Eckhart	Short film
2018	Celeste	Jack	
2018	In Like Flynn	Errol Flynn	
2018	Spare Room	Greg	
2019	Alive	Male Patient	
2019	The Divorce Party	Nate	
2020	Cat Movie: This Is Not A Dog Movie.	L'homme	Short film; also producer, also known in French: Un Homme et un Chat
2021	Escape Room: Tournament of Champions	Nathan	
2024	Pal	Luke	Short film
2026	Found Alive †	TBD	

Key
†	Denotes films that have not yet been released

=== Television ===
Year	Title	Role	Notes
2014	Love Child	Bernie Maguire	Episode: #1.4
2014	Anzac Girls	Frank Smith	Miniseries
2018	Get Christie Love!	Adam	Pilot
2019	The 100	Ryker Desai IX	Recurring role; 6 episodes
2019	SeaChange	Josh	Episode: "Paradise Reclaimed: Mother of all Dilemmas"
2022	The Gilded Age	Tom Raikes	Main cast; 9 episodes
2023	Safe Home	Julian Macdonald	Main cast; 4 episodes
2023	Paper Dolls	Teddy Pearce	7 episodes
2025	All Her Fault	Richie Kaminski	Main cast; 8 episodes
2026	Colin from Accounts	David	Main cast
