= Expecting =

Expecting may refer to:

- "Expecting" (Angel), a 2000 episode of the TV series Angel
- "Expecting", a song from the album White Blood Cells by The White Stripes
- A pregnant female
- Expecting (film), a 2013 American comedy film
