= The Black Demon =

2023 film by Adrian Grünberg

- Release poster
- Directed by: Adrian Grünberg
- Screenplay by: Boise Esquerra
- Story by: Carlos Cisco
- Produced by: Javier Chapa; Jon Silk; Arianne Fraser; Delphine Perrier
- Starring: Josh Lucas; Fernanda Urrejola; Julio Cesar Cedillo
- Cinematography: Antonio Riestra
- Edited by: Sam Baixauli; V. Manu Medina
- Music by: Leonardo Heiblum; Jacobo Lieberman
- Production companies: Highland Film Group; BuzzFeed Studios; Mucho Mas Media; Silk Mass
- Distributed by: The Avenue
- Release date: April 28, 2023
- Running time: 100 minutes
- Countries: United States; Mexico
- Language: English

The Black Demon is a 2023 science fiction thriller film directed by Adrian Grünberg from a screenplay by Boise Esquerra and starring Josh Lucas, Fernanda Urrejola and Julio Cesar Cedillo. In the film, a stranded family on a crumbling oil rig in Baja faces off against a vengeful megalodon shark. It’s an international co-production film between the United States and Mexico.

== Plot ==
Nixon Oil inspector Paul Sturges travels to a small town in Baja California to inspect El Diamante, an offshore oil rig, bringing his wife Ines and their children, Audrey and Tommy, on holiday. They find the town largely abandoned, with the remaining locals hostile towards Paul because he works for the company responsible for the rig. He takes a boat to assess whether the rig should be revitalised or decommissioned, discovering that it is dilapidated, hazardous and surrounded by an oil spill. Only two workers, Chato and Junior, remain aboard, along with their pet chihuahua Toro.

After the locals harass and stalk the family, they follow Paul to the rig. As their boat approaches, Chato and Junior panic when a 70 t (150,000 lb) megalodon, known as the "Black Demon" (Spanish: El Demonio Negro), attacks. The family reaches the rig, but the shark destroys their boat, killing its captain. Chato explains that the other workers either escaped or were killed, while the rig's radio is broken and Nixon Oil ignored requests for help despite knowing about the oil spill. Believing the shark to be a herald of the rain god Tlaloc, Chato sees it as punishment for exploiting nature. While Chato and Junior attempt to restore power underwater, Paul discovers a demolition bomb attached to the rig. The Black Demon kills Junior, though Chato escapes.

Ines finds the rig's safety reports and discovers that warnings were ignored, while Paul had signed documents approving its revitalisation. Paul admits that Nixon Oil used self-inspections to conceal dangerous conditions and threatened him when he challenged the practice, forcing him to act in the company's interests while the community suffered. He realises that Nixon Oil intends for him to take responsibility for the oil spill and die when the bomb detonates.

Determined to make amends, Paul dives underwater to seal the leak and destroy the shark while his family and Chato escape. After sealing the spill, he is trapped by the Black Demon inside the rig's structure. Realising that killing it will require his own sacrifice, Paul straps the bomb to himself and says goodbye to his family over the radio before allowing the shark to consume him. The bomb kills the Black Demon and collapses the rig. Paul's family plans to give his documents to the townspeople so they can hold Nixon Oil accountable. As they return to shore, a fishing boat rescues them as a rainstorm begins.

== Cast ==
- Josh Lucas as Paul
- Fernanda Urrejola as Ines
- Venus Ariel as Audrey
- Carlos Solórzano as Tommy
- Julio Cesar Cedillo as Chato
- Jorge A. Jimenez as Junior
- Raúl Méndez as El Rey
- Héctor Jiménez as Chocolatito
- Edgar Flores as Crazy Eyes
- Omar Chaparro as Sidekick

== Production ==
Principal photography took place in the Dominican Republic from December 2021 to February 2022.

== Release ==
The film was released in theaters on April 28, 2023. It was released on digital on May 30, 2023, and DVD on July 11, 2023.

== Reception ==
On the review aggregator website Rotten Tomatoes, 29% of 38 critics' reviews are positive, with an average rating of 4.2/10. The website's consensus reads: "A small shark in a big pond of man-eating legends, The Black Demon bites off more than it can chew, leaving little carnage for the audience to feast on."

Leslie Felperin of The Guardian regarded the film as, "Daft but fun shark mayhem on [a] Mexican oil rig," writing that, “The Black Demon effectively sticks to [its] well-greased formula.[...][T]he cast commit to it all with evident sincerity, and the banter is nearly as entertaining as the periodic scary interludes." Meagan Navarro of Bloody Disgusting wrote, "The Black Demon only loosely explores the cryptid and instead uses it as a tool to spin a cautionary tale of manmade ecological disaster. But it never builds upon its shallow ideas, resulting in a messy effort sunk by its lackluster human focus."

== Sequel ==
In February 2025, a sequel was announced as being in development with the title officially announced as The Black Demon: Atlantis. Directed by Ben Hernandez Bray, with a script co-written by Aaron Benjamin and Boise Esquerra, the movie will star Jack Kesy, Julio Cesar Cedillo (reprising his role from the first installment), and Kate Del Castillo. The plot will follow a DEA agent named Jerry Simms, who enters a maximum-security prison located in the middle of the Pacific Ocean; and tasked with ending a powerful drug organization, comes into contact with the legendary "Black Demon" shark while various other oceanic monsters cause havoc along the way. Javier Chapa, Phillip Braun and Jon Silk will serve as producers.

The project will be a joint-venture production between Highland Film Group, Mucho Mas Media, Silk Mass, and Harbourview Equity Partners. Distribution rights will be negotiated at the European Film Market (EFM).

== See also ==
- List of underwater science fiction works
