= Ten Tiny Love Stories =

2001 film by Rodrigo García

- Directed by: Rodrigo García
- Written by: Rodrigo García
- Produced by: Alexis Alexanian; Daniel Hassid; Gary Winick
- Starring: Lisa Gay Hamilton; Radha Mitchell; Alicia Witt; Deborah Kara Unger
- Cinematography: Rodrigo Prieto
- Edited by: Luis Cámara
- Music by: Mark Carroll
- Distributed by: Lionsgate
- Release date: 2001
- Running time: 96 minutes
- Country: United States
- Language: English

Ten Tiny Love Stories is a 2001 drama film directed by Rodrigo García and starring Lisa Gay Hamilton and Radha Mitchell. The film is a series of ten monologues about love in its different forms.

== Cast ==
- Radha Mitchell as "One"
- Alicia Witt as "Two"
- Lisa Gay Hamilton as "Three"
- Rebecca Tilney as "Four"
- Kimberly Williams-Paisley as "Five"
- Debi Mazar as "Six"
- Deborah Kara Unger as "Seven"
- Susan Traylor as "Eight"
- Elizabeth Peña as "Nine"
- Kathy Baker as "Ten"
