= Looking for Grace =

2015 film

- Film poster
- Directed by: Sue Brooks
- Written by: Sue Brooks
- Produced by: Lizzette Atkins; Sue Taylor; Alison Tilson
- Starring: Radha Mitchell; Richard Roxburgh; Odessa Young
- Cinematography: Katie Milwright
- Edited by: Peter Carrodus
- Music by: Elizabeth Drake
- Production companies: Unicorn Films, Taylor Media, Gecko Films
- Release dates: 3 September 2015 (Venice); 26 January 2016 (Australia)
- Running time: 100 minutes
- Country: Australia
- Language: English

Looking for Grace is a 2015 Australian drama film directed by Sue Brooks. It was screened in the main competition section of the 72nd Venice International Film Festival and in the inaugural Platform section at the 2015 Toronto International Film Festival. The film was the first film to be directed by an Australian female director to screen at the Venice International Film Festival in 15 years.

The film stars Odessa Young as Grace, her parents Denise and Dan played by Radha Mitchell and Richard Roxburgh, respectively.

== Plot ==
The story follows Grace as she runs away from home to the Wheatbelt of Western Australia. Her parents hire a private detective in an attempt to find her.

== Cast ==
- Radha Mitchell as Denise
- Richard Roxburgh as Dan
- Myles Pollard as Bruce
- Terry Norris as Tom Norris
- Korum Ellis as Policeman
- Odessa Young as Grace
- Tasma Walton as Sandra
- Kelton Pell as Detective David Lockett
- Harry Richardson as Jamie
- Roland van Zwol as Policeman
- Kenya Pearson as Sappho
- Julia Blake as Nell Norris
- Amanda Woodhams as Susie
- Shirley Van Sanden as Rosemary
- Gemma Willing as Anne
- Peter Rowsthorn
- Holly Jones as Julie
- Bailey Hester as Damien

== Release ==
Looking for Grace released cinematically on 26 January 2016, after a World Premiere on 3 September 2015 at the 72nd Venice International Film Festival.

== Reception ==
E. Nina Rothe, writing for The Huffington Post, said "Looking for Grace takes the audience on a series of journeys that still make the little hairs on my arms stand on end. Yes, I am still thinking about the film, nearly a week after watching it."

Nick Dent, writing for TimeOut Sydney, said "The new film from Aussie writer-director Sue Brooks (Japanese Story) borrows a leaf from the Quentin Tarantino book of fractured narrative, jumping back and forth in time to build a jigsaw of a family in crisis, everyone in search of something elusive from life. Brooks’ screenplay is wryly funny about human behaviour, keenly observing the awkward ways anxious people rub up against each other. Roxburgh and Mitchell give well-tuned comic performances and veteran actor Terry Norris steals scenes as the elderly private detective who joins the couple on their search. If you yearn for an evocative, intriguing local film to see on Australia Day, this one will not disappoint."

Paul Byrnes, writing for The Sydney Morning Herald, said "So many comedies - not just local ones - trade in juvenile and trivial ideas; this one offers a deep observation of human nature, with a sense of the ridiculous that's much more satisfying. Brooks knows that life is weirder than movies make out, but not her movies. She rebuts the conventional wisdom about a story needing a hero's journey. Looking for Grace has no heroes, just ordinary people and multiple journeys, yet it lacks nothing in emotional impact or narrative drive."

Mad Dog Bradley, writing for Rip It Up, said "Something of a tough one to discuss, Brooks' film has been accused of unevenness, but surely the ambitious tone is one of its strongest suits, as we shift from teen lust to marital angst to unexpected comedy. And the actors are all strong, with Mitchell and Roxburgh (a long way from TV's Rake) putting in fine performances, and a breakthrough turn from Young, whose elusive Grace holds the subtle saga together."

Greg Daily, writing for InDaily, said "Looking For Grace is told from the slightly varied perspectives of different characters, and scenes are revisited from a range of viewpoints. Brooks has an eye for detail, an understanding of people and how the ordinary and mundane can preoccupy us even during significant occasions; the dialogue is occasionally Pinteresque and every scene is carefully arranged to be visually appealing."

David Stratton writing for The Australian said "Looking for Grace - the title is double-edged - is an impeccably packaged Australian film. The photography, by Katie Milwright, of the West Australian landscape is superlative, from the eye-popping opening shots to the pristine images of the flat, open landscape, while the music score by Elizabeth Drake perfectly complements the narrative. The characters depicted are flawed in all sorts of ways, but Brooks's evident sympathy for all of them shines through and the result is an offbeat road movie filled with surprises and revelations."

Phillipa Hawker for The Sydney Morning Herald said "Looking for Grace is a film of surprising twists and revelations, but it's also a movie that withholds things. It is a work made up of a series of quiet discoveries - some of them involve understanding what it is we cannot know, or coming to terms with what remains mysterious about those close to us."

== Production ==
Unicorn Films, Taylor Media and Gecko Films began pre-production in 2014, with cast announced late 2014.

== Accolades ==
Award/Group	Year	Category	Recipient	Result	Ref.
Venice International Film Festival	2015	Golden Lion	Sue Brooks	Nominated	
Venice International Film Festival	2015	Green Drop Award	Sue Brooks	Nominated	
Toronto International Film Festival	2015	Platform	Sue Brooks	Nominated	
Chicago International Film Festival	2015	Best Feature	Sue Brooks	Nominated	
