= Crackers (1998 film) =

- DVD cover
- Directed by: David Swann
- Written by: David Swann
- Produced by: Chris Warner
- Starring: Daniel Kellie; Warren Mitchell; Susan Lyons; Peter Rowsthorn
- Cinematography: Lazlo Baranyai
- Edited by: Ken Sallows
- Music by: Ricky Edwards
- Production company: Sharmill Films
- Distributed by: Beyond Films; Hollywood Pictures Home Video (VHS)
- Release date: July 9, 1998 (Australia)
- Running time: 92 minutes
- Country: Australia
- Language: English
- Box office: A$1,263,230 (Australia)

Crackers is a 1998 Australian Christmas-themed comedy film directed and written by David Swann. The film stars Warren Mitchell, Daniel Kellie, Susan Lyons, and Peter Rowsthorn, and follows the story of Hilary Dredge (Lyons) and her son Joey (Kellie) as they travel to the suburbs to spend Christmas with Joey's grandparents and his great-grandfather Albert (Warren Mitchell). They are joined by Hilary's boyfriend Bruno (Rowsthorn) and his son Angus (Christopher Chapman), leading to tensions and rivalries, particularly between Joey and Angus. Crackers was released on July 9, 1998, in Australia by Beyond Films, and grossed over $1.26 million at the box office.

== Plot ==
Joey Dredge is struggling with the recent accidental death of his father. After being expelled from school for attempting to fly off a roof, his mother, Hilary, decides to take him to her parents’ suburban home for the Christmas holidays. She brings along her new boyfriend, Bruno, and his son, Angus, both of whom Joey resents.

At the Hall household, Joey encounters a tense and dysfunctional family environment. Hilary's father, Jack, is a brash and opinionated man, while her mother, Violet, focuses on maintaining appearances and coping through food. Also staying at the house is Vi's sister, Dottie. The family gathering becomes even more complicated with the unannounced arrival of Jack's estranged father, Albert, a spirited elderly man recently released from prison.

Due to limited space, Joey is assigned to share the garden shed with Albert. Though initially uncomfortable, Joey forms an unexpected bond with his great-grandfather. In an effort to reconcile with Jack, Albert enlists Bruno and Joey to help him build a wooden boat as a Christmas gift. Despite continued conflicts and misunderstandings, moments of connection begin to emerge among family members.

Albert eventually dies peacefully during the holiday, with Joey by his side. His death prompts Jack to confront his unresolved feelings and express regret over their long-standing estrangement. In the aftermath, Joey accepts Bruno and Angus as part of his life.

== Cast ==
- Daniel Kellie as Joey Dredge
- Susan Lyons as Hilary Dredge
- Peter Rowsthorn as Bruno
- Warren Mitchell as Albert Hall
- Christopher Chapman as Angus
- Terry Gill as Jack Hall
- Valerie Bader as Aunt Dottie
- Maggie King as Violet 'Vi' Hall
- Louise Siversen as Teacher #1
- Ross Williams as Vice Principal
- Rainey Carah as Driver #1

== Production ==
Crackers was written and directed by David Swann, who had previously gained recognition with his successful short film Bonza. The film was produced by Chris Warner under the production company Trout Films. It was shot in Melbourne, Australia, and distributed by Beyond Films. The film's cinematography was handled by Lazlo Baranyai, and it was edited by Ken Sallows. Ricky Edwards composed the music for the film. The film is notable for exploring the clash of personalities and relationships that often arise when families come together during the Christmas holidays.

== Reception ==
Crackers was released in Australia on July 9, 1998, and grossed $1,263,230 at the Australian box office. While it wasn't a major commercial success, it garnered attention for its quirky approach to holiday family conflicts. The film was later re-released on DVD in November 2010, expanding its audience beyond the theater. Despite being relatively modest in terms of box office performance, the film is appreciated by some for its comedic take on the complexities of family relationships and the holiday season.

== See also ==
- Cinema of Australia
- List of Christmas films
