= Josh Lucas =

American actor (born 1971)

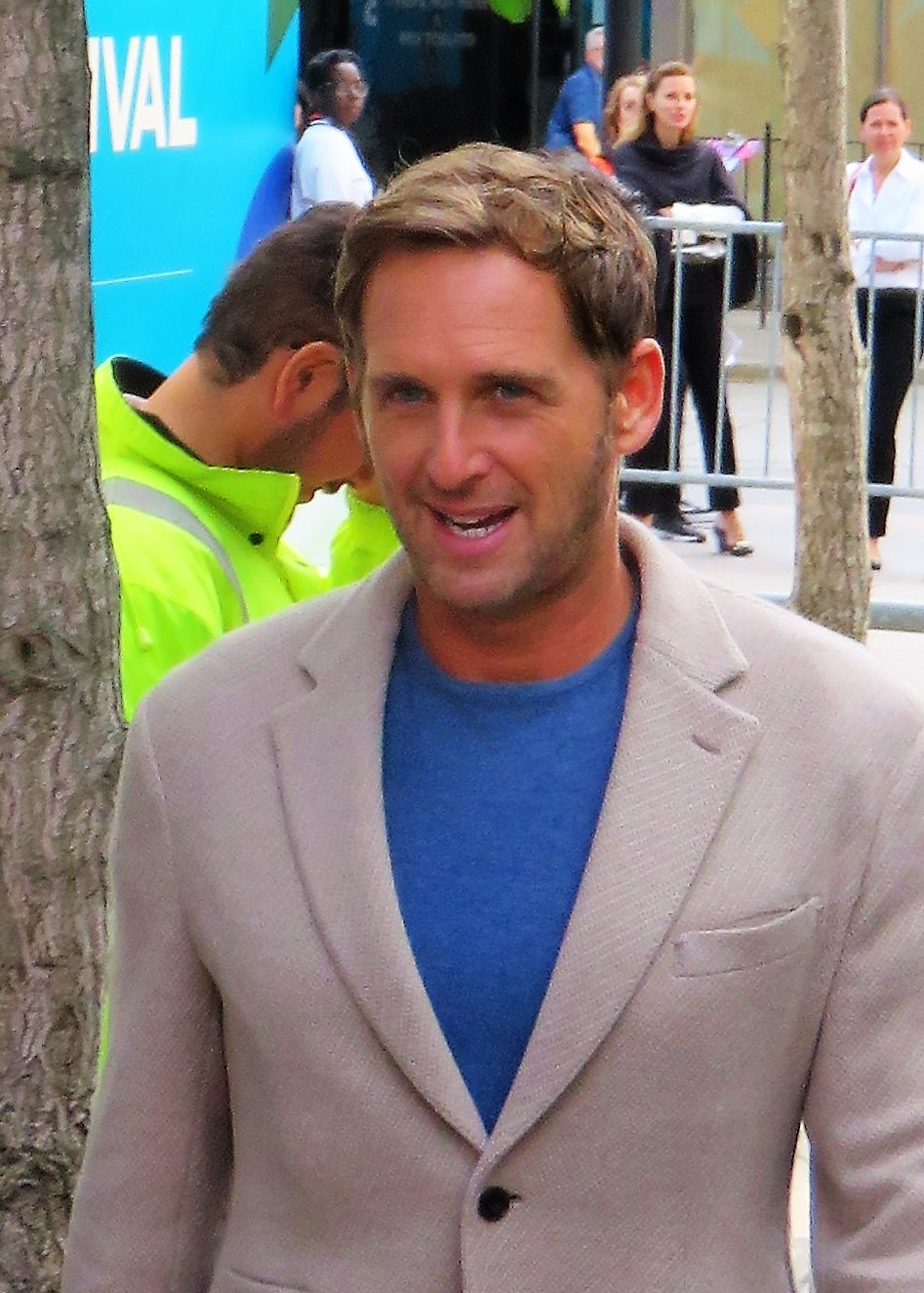
- Lucas at the 2019 Toronto International Film Festival
- Born: Joshua Lucas Easy Dent Maurer; June 20, 1971 (age 55); Little Rock, Arkansas, US
- Other name: Joshua Lucas
- Occupation: Actor
- Years active: 1990–present
- Spouses: Jessica Ciencin Henriquez (m. 2012; div. 2014) Brianna Ruffalo (m. 2025)
- Children: 1

Joshua Lucas Easy Dent Maurer (born June 20, 1971) is an American actor. He is known for his roles in such films as American Psycho (2000), A Beautiful Mind (2001), Sweet Home Alabama (2002), Hulk (2003), Wonderland (2003), Stealth (2005), Glory Road (2006), Poseidon (2006), Red Dog (2011), The Lincoln Lawyer (2011), Ford v Ferrari (2019), and The Black Demon (2023). He has also appeared in television series such as The Firm (2012), The Mysteries of Laura (2014–2016), and Yellowstone (2018–2022).

== Early life and education ==
Joshua Lucas Easy Dent Maurer was born on June 20, 1971, in Little Rock, Arkansas, the son of Michele (née LeFevre), a nurse midwife, and Don Maurer, an emergency room doctor. Lucas has three younger siblings. Michele attended Emerson College with Jay Leno.

Growing up, Lucas traveled with his family throughout the South. His parents were anti-nuclear activists. By age 13, Lucas had lived in 30 different locations, including the Isle of Palms and Sullivan's Island (both in South Carolina). The family eventually settled in Gig Harbor, Washington. He attended Kopachuck Middle School and graduated from Gig Harbor High School in 1989, where he acted in high school plays.

== Career ==
Lucas began his career when he was 19, having moved to Hollywood after his high school graduation. He appeared as a guest star on several TV sitcoms in his early 20s, including Fox's True Colors and Parker Lewis Can't Lose, ABC's family drama Life Goes On, and CBS' private-eye show Jake and the Fatman. Other projects included the horror-thriller Child of Darkness, Child of Light, an adaptation of James Patterson's novel Virgin, a tale of two Catholic schoolgirls who find themselves pregnant under mysterious and supernatural circumstances. Lucas followed this appearance by working with executive producer Steven Spielberg and then-unknown actor Clive Owen in the TV movie Class of '61, which follows the stories of a group of West Point cadets in 1861 as the Civil War breaks out. Lucas played George Armstrong Custer.

Soon afterward, he made his feature film debut in Frank Marshall's Alive (1993) about a group of Uruguayan rugby players who, after crashing in the Andes mountains, resort to cannibalism to stay alive. After a brief appearance in the Patrick Swayze comedy Father Hood (1993), Lucas relocated to Australia to play the hotheaded American cousin Luke McGregor opposite Andrew Clarke and Guy Pearce in the first season of the family western The Man from Snowy River (released in US and UK as Snowy River: The McGregor Saga). Lucas appeared in all 13 episodes of the first season, but claimed in a later interview that despite the friendly environment, he was homesick for the United States, and his character was killed off in the second episode of season 2.

Upon returning to the States, he was still receiving offers as high school/college boyfriends and felt he was not getting the age-appropriate roles he sought. While working with George C. Scott on a TV movie from the In the Heat of the Night series, Scott told him he needed to take acting lessons and develop his talent for both stage and screen. Shortly thereafter, Lucas relocated to New York City, where he studied privately with various acting coaches. One of Lucas' first feature roles was playing Jace "Flash" Dillon in the 1994 cinematic PC flight simulator Wing Commander III: Heart of the Tiger.

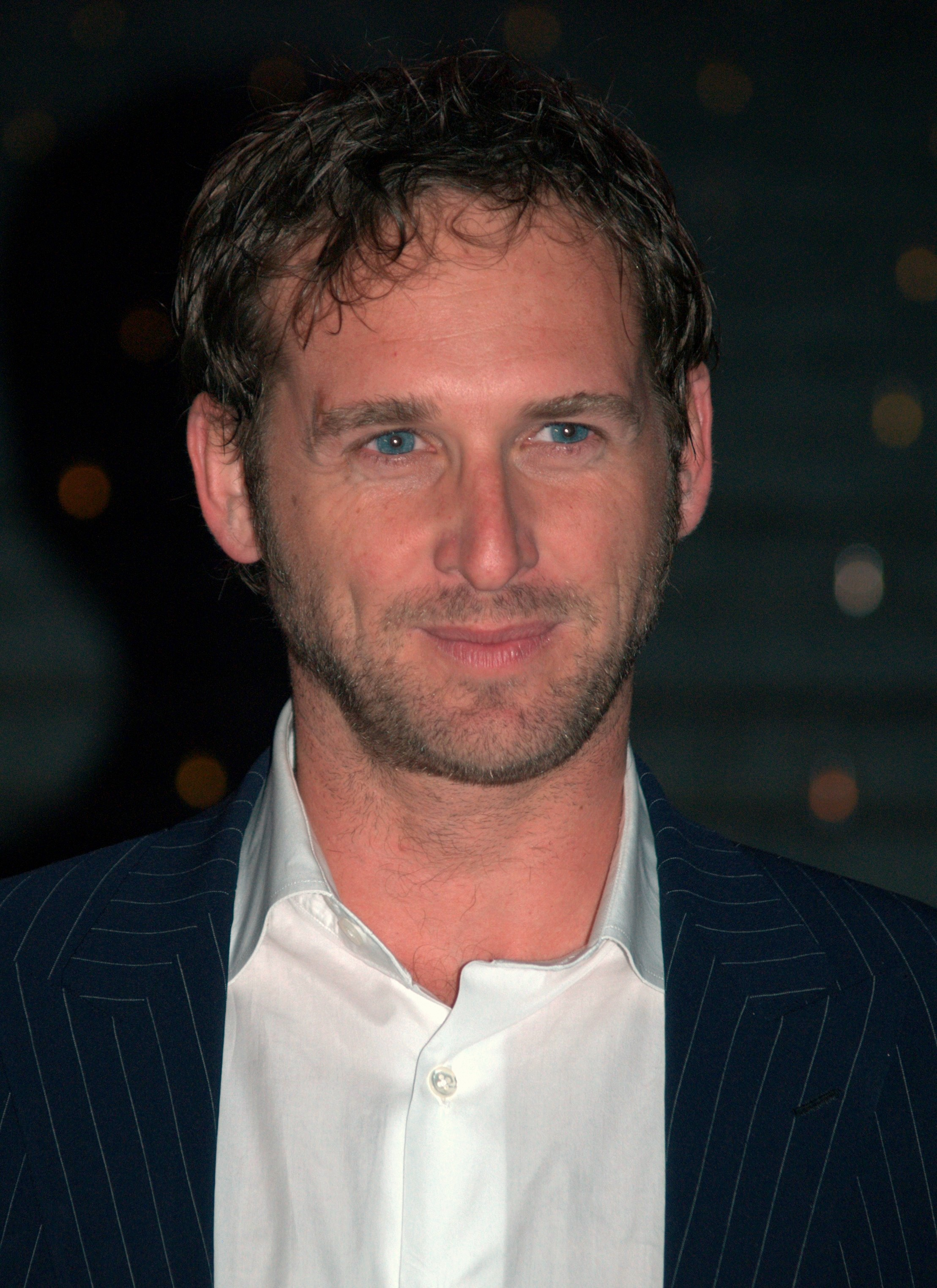
Lucas at a Vanity Fair party in New York City, April 21, 2009

The second part of his career began with a lead role in the British rowing film True Blue (1996, released in the US as Miracle at Oxford), in which he played a hotshot Navy rower who is recruited along with three other Americans to help Oxford win its annual boat race against Cambridge. He followed that with relatively small roles in the dramas Minotaur and Harvest. He performed in his first comedy, The Definite Maybe, portraying a recent college graduate who gets fired from his job and schemes with an old friend to purchase a house in the Hamptons.

He appeared as an American businessman in Jule Gilfillan's romantic comedy-drama Restless (1998). He also appeared in an off-Broadway production of Terrence McNally's controversial Corpus Christi, a retelling of the Passion of Jesus, with the Jesus character (named Joshua) and his disciples all being gay. Lucas played the role of Judas as a gay predator. Right before the play was to open, Lucas was mugged and beaten on his way to the theater for dress rehearsal. He played the role of Judas with bloody bandages across his broken nose and black eyes. The audience thought the bandages were part of the play. Following a series of operations to reset his nose, he began gathering larger roles in films like You Can Count on Me (2000), The Dancer (2000), American Psycho (2000), The Weight of Water (2000), Session 9 (2001), When Strangers Appear (2001), Secondhand Lions (2003), and Wonderland (2003).

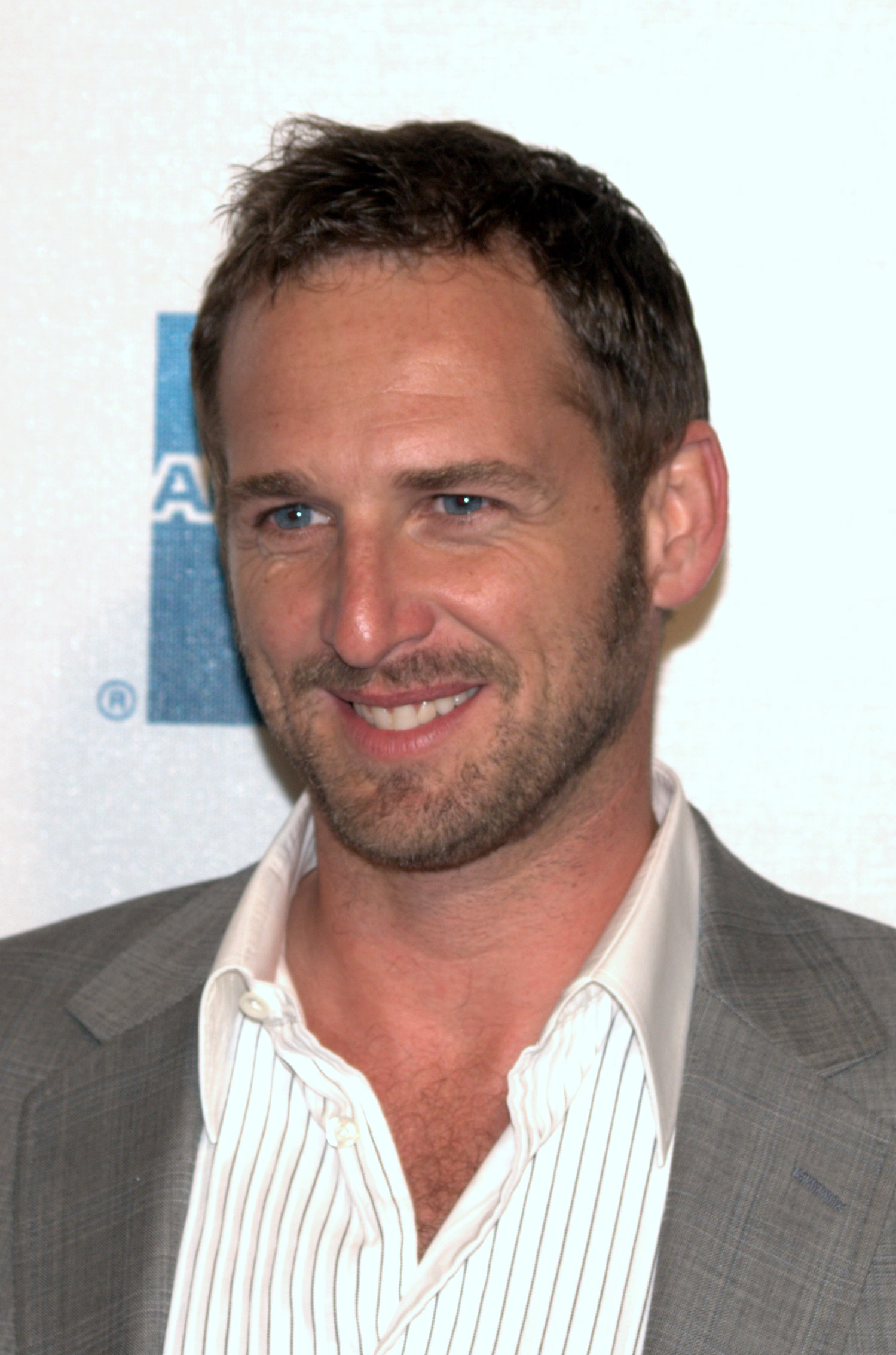
Lucas at the 2009 premiere of Poliwood

Lucas gained mainstream exposure after his roles in A Beautiful Mind (2001), Sweet Home Alabama (2002), and as Glenn Talbot in Hulk (2003). He later had leading roles in movies such as Stealth (2005), Glory Road (2006), and Poseidon (2006). In Glory Road, he starred as basketball coach Don Haskins, a role for which he gained 40 lb (18 kg). His next project was Boaz Yakin’s Death in Love (2008).

In 2009, Lucas starred in the Ridley Scott-produced Tell-Tale, a film based on the short story "The Tell-Tale Heart" by Edgar Allan Poe. Earlier that year, he was seen on stage in the off-Broadway run of Spalding Gray: Stories Left to Tell. Lucas also completed his second collaboration with documentary filmmaker Ken Burns, after being involved in Burns’ The War. Lucas' other documentary work includes Operational Homecoming, Trumbo, and the LA Film Festival Audience Award-winning Resolved. In that same year, he was cast in the Anders Anderson's drama thriller Stolen as the single father of a mentally challenged boy, starring alongside Rhona Mitra and Jon Hamm; the film had a limited theatrical release in March 2010. Lucas also co-starred in the following films released in 2010; Peacock opposite Cillian Murphy and Elliot Page, Shadows and Lies alongside James Franco and Julianne Nicholson, and Life as We Know It with Katherine Heigl and Josh Duhamel.

In 2011, Lucas co-starred with Rachael Taylor in the film Red Dog (2011), based on the true story of an Australian Kelpie. Lucas won an Inside Film Award for his role. That same year, he appeared with Matthew McConaughey in the film The Lincoln Lawyer. In 2012, he starred in the NBC television show The Firm, which takes place ten years after the John Grisham's novel it is based on. The show lasted one season.

In 2013, Lucas was cast as the lead role in the independent comedy-drama, The Mend. The directorial debut of John Magary, it premiered at South By Southwest in March 2014 with Lucas receiving a series of positive reviews for his portrayal of Mat, one of two dysfunctional brothers who collide in a small Harlem apartment. From September 2014 to March 2016, Lucas appeared as a main character in the NBC crime drama The Mysteries of Laura. In 2018, he was cast in a recurring role in Yellowstone, as a younger version of John Dutton, portrayed by Kevin Costner. His later films included Ford v Ferrari (2019), The Forever Purge (2021), and The Black Demon (2023).

Lucas's career also includes voice-over work (or voice acting) with Breathe Bible. He is also the voice-over actor behind The Home Depot TV and radio ads. In 2022, he lent his voice to Burns' documentary about Benjamin Franklin as Franklin's son William.

In 2026, Lucas was cast in the western thriller film The Rescue.

== Personal life ==
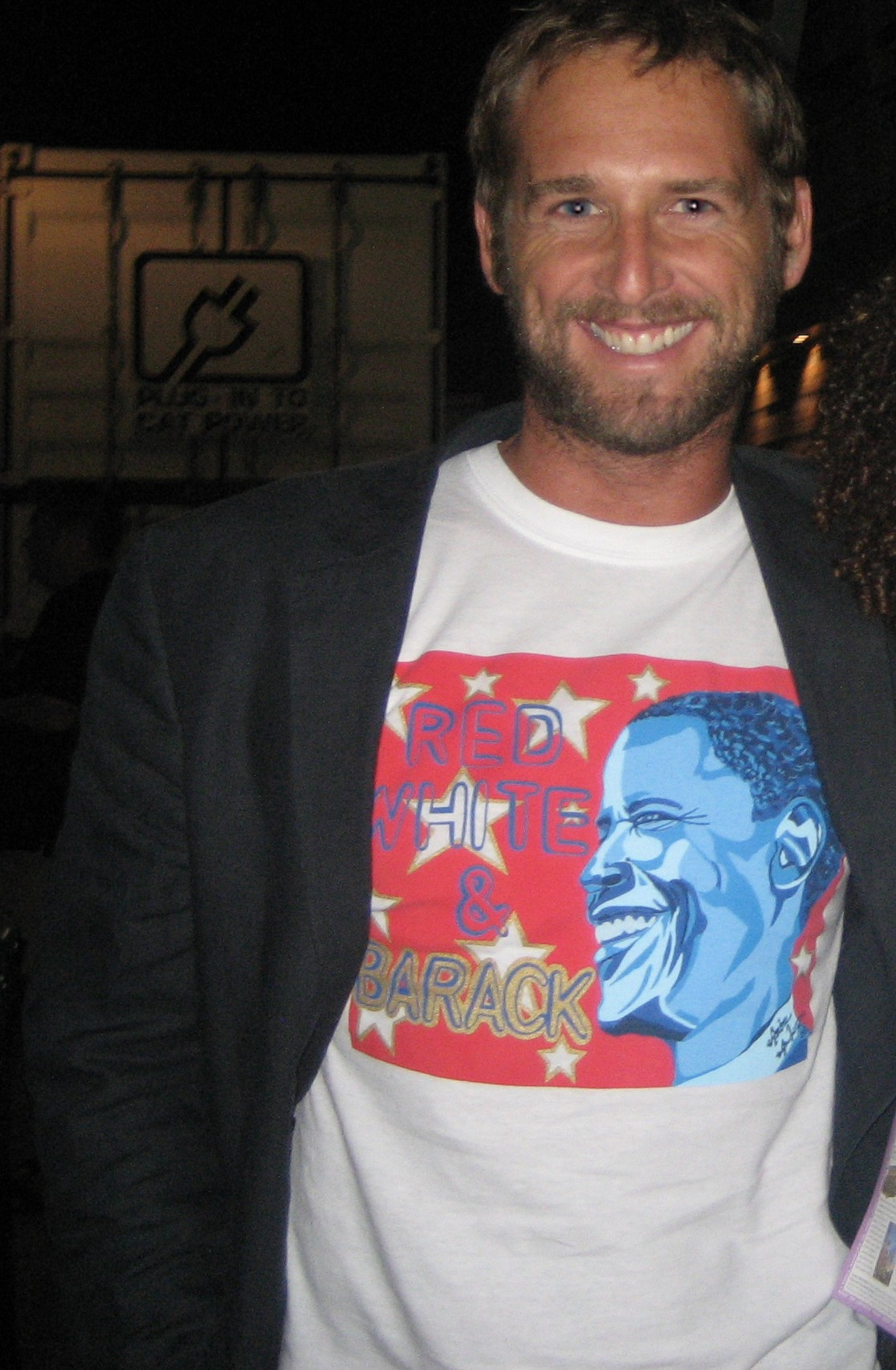
Lucas at the 2008 Democratic National Convention in Denver, Colorado

Lucas met author and editor Jessica Ciencin Henriquez at a dog park in 2011. They became engaged six weeks later and married on March 17, 2012, in Central Park. Their son, Noah Rev, was born in June 2012. In January 2014, Henriquez filed for a divorce that became final in October 2014. Lucas met meteorologist Brianna Ruffalo in 2022. They were engaged in June 2024, and were married in July 2025 in Vatican City.

=== Other pursuits ===
Lucas is an owner and promoter of the company Filthy Food with friends Marc and Daniel Singer.

A YouthAIDS Ambassador, Lucas "first joined the YouthAIDS team when he shot the ALDO HIV/AIDS awareness campaign in April, 2005. Soon after, he officially accepted his role as a YouthAIDS Ambassador at the YouthAIDS 2005 Gala, Faces of Africa. HIV/AIDS prevention is particularly important to him as his mother 'has made a career counseling young men and women with the hopes of educating them about the ravaging and often deadly effects of this too common and easily preventable disease.'"

=== Political views ===
Lucas supported US President candidate Barack Obama during the 2008 United States presidential campaign, volunteering to help potential voters register at colleges in Pennsylvania. Lucas knocked on doors and phone banked, wearing an Obama shirt for 45 days. He was also in Denver, Colorado, for the 2008 Democratic National Convention with a group of actors called the Creative Coalition.

== Filmography ==
=== Film ===
Year	Title	Role	Notes
1993	Alive	Felipe Restano	
1993	Father Hood	Andy	
1996	Thinner	Male Nurse	Uncredited
1996	True Blue	Dan Warren	
1997	The Definite Maybe	Eric Traber	
1998	Harvest	Clay Upton	
1998	Restless	Jeff Hollingsworth	
2000	You Can Count on Me	Rudy Kolinski, Sr.	
2000	The Dancer	Stephane	
2000	American Psycho	Craig McDermott	
2000	The Weight of Water	Rich Janes	
2001	The Deep End	Darby Reese	
2001	Session 9	Hank Romero	
2001	When Strangers Appear	Peter	
2001	A Beautiful Mind	Martin Hansen	
2002	Coastlines	Eddie Vance	
2002	Sweet Home Alabama	Jake Perry	
2003	Hulk	Glenn Talbot	
2003	Secondhand Lions	Adult Walter Caldwell	
2003	Wonderland	Ron Launius	
2004	Undertow	Deel Munn	
2004	Around the Bend	Jason Lair	
2005	Stealth	Lt. Ben Gannon	
2005	An Unfinished Life	Sheriff Crane Curtis	
2006	Glory Road	Don Haskins	
2006	Poseidon	Dylan Johns	
2008	Death in Love	Eldest Son	
2008	Management	Barry	
2009	Tell-Tale	Terry Bernard	
2009	Stolen	Matthew Wakefield	
2010	Peacock	Officer Tom McGonigle	
2010	Shadows and Lies	Boss	
2010	Daydream Nation	Barry Anderson	
2010	Life as We Know It	Dr. Sam Nelson	
2011	Little Murder	Ben Chaney	
2011	Red Dog	John Grant	
2011	The Lincoln Lawyer	Ted Minton	
2011	Hide Away	Young Mariner	
2011	J. Edgar	Charles Lindbergh	
2012	Stolen	Vincent Kinsey	
2013	Space Warriors	Col. Roy Manley	
2013	Big Sur	Neal Cassady	
2013	Wish You Well	Cotton Longfellow	
2014	Little Accidents	Bill Doyle	
2014	The Mend	Mat	
2014	Boychoir	Gerard Olin	
2016	Dear Eleanor	Frank Morris	
2016	Youth in Oregon	Danny Engersol	
2017	The Most Hated Woman in America	David Waters	
2017	Mark Felt: The Man Who Brought Down the White House	Charlie Bates	
2018	What They Had	Eddie Ertz	
2018	Murderous Trance	Bjørn Schouw Neilsen	
2019	Breakthrough	Brian Smith	
2019	Ford v Ferrari	Leo Beebe	
2020	She Dies Tomorrow	Doc	
2020	The Secret: Dare to Dream	Bray Johnson	
2021	The Forever Purge	Dylan Tucker	
2023	The Black Demon	Paul Sturgess	
2023	Blood for Dust	John	
2024	Queen of the Ring	Billy Wolfe	
2025	The Map That Leads to You	Greg Mulgrew	
2026	By Any Means	Special Agent Everett Rhodes	
2027	The Rescue †	TBA	Post-production
TBA	The Marshmallow Experiment †	Dr. Newman	Post-production

=== Television ===
Year	Title	Role	Notes
1990	True Colors	Jonathan	1 episode
1990	Life Goes On	Dylan	1 episode
1991	Parker Lewis Can't Lose	Evan	1 episode
1991	Child of Darkness, Child of Light	John L. Jordan III	Television film
1991	Jake and the Fatman	Jeff Boyce	1 episode
1993	Class of '61	George Armstrong Custer	Television film
1994	In the Heat of the Night	Todd Walker	1 episode
1994–1995	The Man from Snowy River	Luke McGregor	Main role, 15 episodes
1999	Cracker	Lt. Macy	3 episodes
2005	Empire Falls	Young Max Roby	Miniseries
2006	Will & Grace	Himself	1 episode
2009	WWII in HD	Bert Stiles	Voice
2012	The Firm	Mitch McDeere	Main role; 22 episodes
2014–2016	The Mysteries of Laura	Jake Broderick	Main role; 38 episodes
2015–2017	Last Week Tonight with John Oliver	Forensic Scientist / Bridge Inspector	2 episodes
2018–2022	Yellowstone	Young John Dutton	6 episodes
2022	Long Slow Exhale	Hillman Ford	12 episodes
2024	Palm Royale	Douglas Darby Dellacorte-Simmons	Main role
TBA	Discretion	Greg	Main role

=== Theatre ===
Year	Title	Role
1997–1998	Corpus Christi	Judas Iscariot
2009	Spalding Gray: Stories Left to Tell	Spalding Gray
2017–2018	The Parisian Woman	Tom

=== Video games ===
Year	Title	Voice role
1994	Wing Commander III: Heart of the Tiger	Major Jace "Flash" Dillon
2024	NBA 2K25	Jalen Murphy
