= Mark Famiglietti =

American actor and screenwriter

- Born: 1979 or 1980 (age 46–47); Rhode Island, U.S.
- Education: New York University
- Occupations: Actor, screenwriter, producer
- Years active: 1998–present
- Children: 2
- Website: marknow.com

Mark Famiglietti (born 1979 or 1980) is an American actor, screenwriter, film producer and author. He is best known for appearing in television shows such as Hang Time and Young Americans. He also appeared in Terminator 3: Rise of the Machines.

== Career ==
Famiglietti attended New York University as a drama major, where he studied with the Atlantic Theatre Company. During his second semester, he put college on hold and headed for Hollywood after being cast as Nick Hammer, on the NBC series Hang Time. He also guest-starred on The WB comedy Zoe, Duncan, Jack and Jane, landed the role of Scout on the short-lived WB series Young Americans.

In 2017 he wrote the book, and later a screenplay: both were named The Divorce Party.

== Film and television ==
Year	Film	Role	Notes
1998–2000	Hang Time	Nick Hammer	Main cast (season 4); guest (seasons 5–6) TV
1999	Zoe	Brad	TV
1999	Sagamore	Jason	TV
2000	A Tale of Two Bunnies	Cork	TV
2000	Young Americans	Scout Calhoun	TV
2000	CSI: Crime Scene Investigation	Matt Daniels	TV
2002	We Were the Mulvaneys	Mike Mulvaney Jr.	TV
2002	Full Ride	Travis	TV
2003	Fastlane	Jarod	TV
2003	Terminator 3: Rise of the Machines	Scott Mason	Movie
2006	Conviction	Chris Maleski	TV
2006	CSI: NY	Bobby Martin	TV
2006	Cold Case	Devon	TV
2007	Premonition	Doug Caruthers	Movie
2007	Eyes	Tim Smits	2005–2007 TV
2007	Nobel Son	Officer Relyea	TV
2008	Bottle Shock	Waiter	Movie
2008	CSI: Miami	Charlie Decker	TV
2008	Without a Trace	Chris Howe	TV
2008	Who's Wagging Who?	Tim	2009–2010 TV
2009	Bionicle: The Legend Reborn	Gresh (voice)	Video
2009	FlashForward	Mike Willingham	2009–2010 TV Series
2010	Gun	ATF Agent Peterson	Movie
2011	Bones	Eric Anderson	TV
2012	Live at the Foxes Den	Steve Weiss	Movie
2012	Mad Men	Bernie Rosenberg	TV
2012	Stealing Roses	Johnny Domas	
2012	Home for Christmas	Roger	Movie
2012	March Sisters at Christmas	Marcus Bhaer	
2012	Acting Like Adults	Brett	
2013	Dark Power	David Newman	
2013	Horizon		TV movie
2013	Live at the Foxes Den	Steve Weiss	Movie
2013	A Fairytale Christmas (TV movie)	Tony	TV movie
2015	Grimm	Linus Balouzian	Episode: "Double Date"
2015	Stolen from Suburbia	Tom	
2015	Secrets of a Psychopath	Henry	
2015	Secret in Their Eyes	Duty Sergeant	Movie
2016	Aquarius (American TV series)	Jay Sebring	TV
2016	Castle (TV series)	Scott Weeinberg	TV
2016	Secrets of a Psychopath	Henry	
2017	My Daddy's in Heaven	Bucky	
2017	The Greens Are Gone	Man at Track	Movie
2018	Her Boyfriend's Secret	John	TV movie
2018	Shattered Memories	Lyle	Movie
2019	Rediscovering Christmas	John	TV movie
2019	The Missing Sister	Dev	
2019	Life Like	Ronald Gitts	
2019	The Divorce Party	Jake	Movie
2020	YA	Joe	3 episodes
2021	Soulmate(s)	Landon	
2024	Chosen Family	Todd	Post-production
2024	Consumed	Jay	

== Bibliography ==
- Famiglietti, Mark; Garrison, Lane (2018). The Divorce Party. Virginia: Lisa Hagen Books. ISBN 978-1-945962-40-0.
