= Martin Four =

2001 short film by Ben Hackworth

- Directed by: Ben Hackworth
- Starring: Susan Lyons; Todd MacDonald
- Cinematography: Katie Milwright
- Release date: 2001 (Australia)
- Country: Australia
- Language: English

Martin Four is a 2001 short film written and directed by Ben Hackworth. It stars Susan Lyons and Todd MacDonald. It was photographed by Katie Milwright and the production designer was Duncan Maurice.

The film was the second Australian short film to appear in the Cinefondation competition of Cannes Film Festival.

== Cast ==
- Susan Lyons as Grace
- Todd MacDonald as Martin
