= Charlotte Best =

Australian actress and model (born 1994)

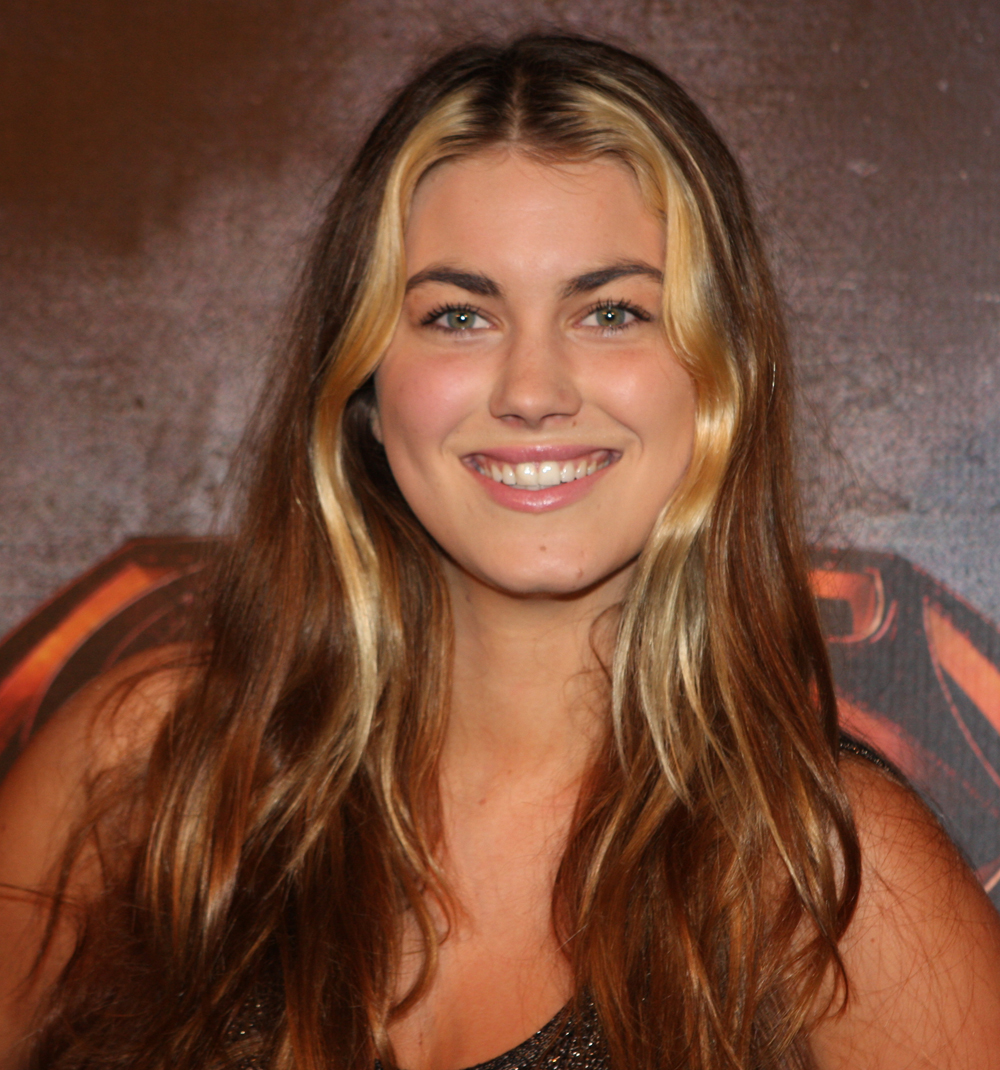
- Best at Man of Steel red carpet movie premiere in Sydney (2013)
- Born: Charlotte Elise Best; 16 January 1994 (age 32); Gosford, New South Wales, Australia
- Occupations: Actress, model
- Years active: 2006–present

Charlotte Elise Best (born 16 January 1994) is an Australian actress and model. She is best known for her role in the show Home and Away as the young girl in the Campbell family, Annie Campbell.

== Biography ==
Best grew up in the suburb of Point Frederick in the city of Gosford in New South Wales. Along with her three brothers, Best attended Central Coast Grammar School where she won a performance award at the age of eight. From there she moved with her family to Beauty Point, attending SCECGS Redlands for six months until enrolling at Brent Street Performing Arts High School.

Best made her television debut in 2007 in Home and Away, starring as Annie Campbell until 2010. She continued her education on-set, eventually completing her HSC in 2011 at Oxford Falls Grammar School. Three months into a full-time Global Studies course at the University of Technology, Sydney, Best accepted the role of Cheryl Hayes in Puberty Blues.

From a young age, Best has appeared regularly as a fashion model in such magazines as Barbie, Total Girl, Oyster and Cosmopolitan. She was the face of Miss Metallicus Clothing brand and appeared on Comedy Inc, and has modelled for Supre.

She has been an ambassador for the charities Cure Our Kids and World Vision.

== Career ==
Her most notable role was as Annie Campbell in the long running TV series Home and Away between 2007 and 2010. Her character went on a student exchange to Japan, commencing October 2009, which was originally scheduled to be for 6 months. She returned on screen in March 2010, on a 6-week holiday break from Japan, before leaving again. Best earned a nomination for Most Popular New Female Talent at the Logie Awards of 2008, which was won by Bindi Irwin.

In March 2012, it was announced that Best had been cast as Cheryl Hayes in Network Ten's drama series Puberty Blues, which is based on the 1979 novel of the same name by Gabrielle Carey and Kathy Lette.

In 2018 she starred in the Australian web television series Tidelands as Cal McTeer, the lead role. It was released on 14 December 2018 on Netflix. She has also starred as Aria Wolf in the film Ascendant, released on 8 April 2021.

== Filmography ==
Year	Title	Role	Notes
2023	Skinford: Death Sentence	Zophia	
2021	Ascendant	Aria Wolf	Release date: 8 April 2021
2021	Fires	Mish	Season 1, episodes 4 & 6
2019	A Name Without a Place	Emma Lee Herring	
2018	Skinford: Chapter Two	Zophia	
2018	Tidelands	Cal McTeer	Main role: Season 1 (8 episodes)
2017	An American in Texas	Kara Warrington	
2017	Skinford	Zophia	
2016	Teenage Kicks	Phaedra	
2015	Alone	Nina 2	Short film
2015	Is This the Real World	Kim	
2014	Soul Mates	Kelly	Season 1 (6 episodes)
2013	Breathe	Anna	Short film
2012–2014	Puberty Blues	Cheryl Hayes	Main role: Seasons 1 & 2 (17 episodes)
2007–2010	Home and Away	Annie Campbell	Main role: Seasons 20–23 (198 episodes)
