= No Worries (film) =

1994 film

- Directed by: David Elfick
- Written by: David Holman
- Produced by: David Elfick; Eric Fellner
- Starring: Geoff Morrell; Amy Terelinck; Susan Lyons; John Hargreaves
- Cinematography: Stephen F. Windon
- Edited by: Louise Innes
- Music by: Patrick Seymour; David A. Stewart
- Production company: Palm Beach Pictures
- Release date: 1994
- Running time: 92 minutes
- Country: Australia
- Language: English

No Worries is a 1994 Australian film directed by David Elfick. It was based on a play Elfick had seen in the 1980s.

== Plot ==
An Australian family experiences extreme drought on their property. A neighbour is forced to sell up at distress prices, then their farm is destroyed by a local storm and they are forced to start a new life in multicultural Western Sydney. Their daughter Matilda is badly affected: her dog "Dingo" has had to be destroyed and she is dragged into an unfamiliar environment: classroom crowded with children from strange countries strange, noisy streets crowded with people from strange cultures. The adults try to jolly her into accepting her new surroundings: they take her to a basketball game and she gets to meet her idol Kenny McClary of the Sydney Kings, but to no avail. She escapes to the beach, the only place where she can see the horizon and be alone. She walks out into the water as though she were contemplating suicide, but a Vietnamese girl catches up with her, followed by Matilda's distressed parents. The film ends with them frolicking in the shallows.

== Cast ==
- Geoff Morrell as Ben Bell
- Amy Terelinck as Matilda Bell
- Susan Lyons as Ellen Bell
- John Hargreaves as Clive Ryan
- Steven Vidler as Gary Hay
- Ray Barrett as Old Burkey
- Harold Hopkins as John Burke
- Annie Byron as Mrs Burke
- Bob Baines as Tom Drew
- Simon Westaway as Auctioneer
