= Susan Lyons =

Australian actress

- Born: Sydney, New South Wales, Australia
- Occupations: Actress, producer
- Years active: 1981–present
- Known for: All Saints, Farscape
- Spouse: Jefferson Mays
- Children: 4

Susan Lyons is an Australian actress.

== Career ==
=== Film and television ===
Lyons' television appearances include: A Country Practice, Police Rescue, Murder Call, Farscape, Something in the Air and All Saints.

Her film appearances include: The Good Wife, No Worries, In a Savage Land, Black and White, Corroboree, Martin Four and Napoleon.

Lyons starred in the 1998 Australian Christmas film Crackers, playing single mother Hilary who hates Christmas.

=== Theatre ===
Lyons has also appeared extensively in stage productions for many of the major theatre companies in Australia, including Sydney Theatre Company, Melbourne Theatre Company, State Theatre Company of South Australia and Bell Shakespeare. She has appeared in such titles as Hamlet, Macbeth, A Midsummer Night’s Dream, The Merchant of Venice, The Comedy of Errors, The Vagina Monologues, The Beggar’s Opera, As You Like It, Pygmalion, Measure for Measure and Two Weeks with the Queen.

Her most recent credits includes work as an associate director on the 2003 Broadway production of I Am My Own Wife directed by Moisés Kaufman which was also staged in Melbourne in 2006. She also adapted a version of A Christmas Carol, which has been staged on Broadway and throughout the US from 2018 onward.

She has also narrated the audio book version of Incendiary, by Chris Cleave.

== Personal life ==
Lyons is married to Tony Award-winning theatre and film actor Jefferson Mays. They first met in 2002 when Lyons saw Mays perform in a production of Outward Bound at the Westport Country Playhouse, in Connecticut.

== Awards ==
Year	With	Award	Category	Result
1993	Susan Lyons	Marten Bequest Scholarship	Acting	Won

== Filmography ==
=== Film ===
Year	Title	Role	Type
1983	The Winds of Jarrah	Diana Venness	Feature film
1987	The Umbrella Woman (aka The Good Wife)	Mrs. Fielding	Feature film
1987	The Riddle of the Stinson	Jean Batten	TV film
1989	The Hijacking of the Achille Lauro	Ruth	TV film
1990	Wendy Cracked a Walnut (aka ...Almost)	Caroline	Feature film
1992	Six Pack: Loveless	Annie	TV film series, 1 episode
1993	No Worries	Ellen Bell	Feature film
1994	Ebbtide	Alison	Feature film
1994	The Roly Poly Man	Sandra Burnett	Feature film
1995	Napoleon	Penny, Napoleon's Mum / Other Wallaby (voice)	Feature film
1996	The Territorians	Anne McCabe	TV film
1998	Halifax f.p.: Afraid of the Dark	Detective Helen de Castro	TV film series, 1 episode
1998	Crackers	Hilary Dredge	Feature film
1999	In a Savage Land	Helen Stevens	Feature film
2001	Martin Four	Grace	Film short
2002	Black and White	Dr. Thompson (uncredited)	Feature film
2005	Life	Jean Gregory	TV film
2007	Corroboree	Verna	Feature film

=== Television ===
Year	Title	Role	Type
1982	For the Term of His Natural Life	Sarah	TV miniseries, 3 episodes
1983; 1989; 1990	A Country Practice	Sister Sandy Wright / Elizabeth Brown / Linda Freeman	TV series, 10 episodes
1984	Five Mile Creek	Miss Parling	TV series, season 2, episode 10: "Matchmaker"
1987	Willing and Abel		TV series, 1 episode
1988	Stringer	Laura Chandler	TV series, 8 episodes
1990	Rafferty's Rules		TV series, 1 episode
1990	Come in Spinner	Dallas McIntyre	TV miniseries, 2 episodes
1991; 1993	Eggshells	Jill Knight	TV series, 13 episodes
1991	G.P.		TV series, 1 episode
1992	E Street	Nancy Plimshaw	TV series, 2 episodes
1992	Six Pack	Annie	TV series, season 1, episode 2: "Loveless"
1995	Police Rescue	Janet	TV series, season 4, episode 6: "Double Jeopardy"
1996	Mercury	Nell Roberts	TV miniseries, 13 episodes
1996	Sun on the Stubble	Ellie Gunther	TV miniseries, 6 episodes
1997	Fallen Angels		TV series, 1 episode
1998	Murder Call	Amanda MacKenzie	TV series, season 2, episode 16: "A View to a Kill"
1998	Three Forever	Martha Graves	TV miniseries
1999	Dog's Head Bay	Vicki Santorini	TV series, 13 episodes
2001	Farscape	Sierjna	TV series, season 3, episode 12: "Meltdown"
2001	All Saints	Natalie Moyes	TV series, season 4, episode 39: "Child's Play"
2002	Something in the Air	Sue Smithies	TV series, 5 episodes
2010	American Experience	Elizabeth Merry	TV series, season 22, episode 4: "Dolley Madison"

== Theatre ==
=== As actor ===
Year	Title	Role	Venue / Co.
1979; 1980	The Three Sisters	Natalia	Jane Street Theatre, Sydney with NIDA, Playhouse, Adelaide with STCSA
1979	The Beggar’s Opera		NIDA Theatre, Sydney, Playhouse, Canberra
1979	The Ballad of the Sad Café		NIDA Theatre, Sydney
1980	The Mystery Plays of Wakefield		Playhouse, Adelaide with STCSA
1980	The Float	Tina	Playhouse, Adelaide with STCSA
1980	On the Wallaby	Premier Butler / Miss Collins / Happy Valley / Woman	Playhouse, Adelaide with STCSA
1980	Pericles, Prince of Tyre		Theatre 62, Adelaide with STCSA
1980	Traitors		Theatre 62, Adelaide with STCSA
1980	A Month in the Country	Vera	Playhouse, Adelaide with STCSA
1980	Red Light Square		Theatre 62, Adelaide with STCSA
1981	Buckley's!	Di	Playhouse, Adelaide with STCSA
1981	Pygmalion	Clara Eynsford-Hill	Playhouse, Adelaide with STCSA
1981	As You Like It	Rosalind / Audrey	Theatre 62, Adelaide with STCSA
1982	Macbeth		Sydney Opera House with STC
1983	The Portage to San Cristobal of A.H.	Anna	Sydney Opera House with STC
1985	The Real Thing	Charlotte	SGIO Theatre, Brisbane with Queensland Theatre
1986	Measure for Measure		Wharf Theatre, Sydney with STC
1986, 1987	Aren’t We All?	Margot	His Majesty's Theatre, Perth, Comedy Theatre, Melbourne, Her Majesty's Theatre, Sydney
1988	The Game of Love and Chance		Wharf Theatre, Sydney with STC
1988	An Ideal Husband		Wharf Theatre, Sydney with STC
1989	A Midsummer Night’s Dream	Titania	Sydney Opera House with STC
1991	The Merchant of Venice	Portia	Sydney Showground with Bell Shakespeare, Melbourne Athenaeum
1991	Hamlet	Voltemand / 2nd Player	Melbourne Athenaeum
1991	South American Barbecue		Belvoir Street Theatre, Sydney with North Coast Theatre Company
1995	Paradise Lost		St George's Cathedral, Perth
1995	Two Weeks with the Queen		Alexander Theatre, Johannesburg, South African State Theatre, Wharf Theatre, Sydney with STC
1996	The Queen and I	Princess Diana	Comedy Theatre, Melbourne, Monash University, Her Majesty's Theatre, Adelaide, Gold Coast Arts Centre, Newcastle Civic Theatre with Out of Joint Theatre Company
1997	The Comedy of Errors	Adriana	Sydney Opera House with STC for Sydney Festival
1996	Big Hair in America		The Butter Factory Theatre, Wodonga with HotHouse Theatre
2001	The Vagina Monologues		Ensemble Theatre, Sydney
2002	Night Letters		Australian National University, Canberra with Australian National Playwrights Conference
2002	The Eye of the Needle		Civic Square Canberra with Elbow Theatre
2003	All My Sleep and Waking		Australian National University, Canberra with Australian National Playwrights Conference

=== As director ===
Year	Title	Role	Venue / Co.
2003–2004; 2006	I Am My Own Wife	Artistic Consultant / Associate Director	Lyceum Theatre, Broadway, Malthouse Theatre, Melbourne with MTC
2018–2024	A Christmas Carol	Adaptor	Geffen Playhouse, Los Angeles, South Coast Repertory Theatre, Park Theatre, New Hampshire, Nederlander Theatre, Broadway, Old Globe Theatre, San Diego
