= Celeste (2018 film) =

- Film poster
- Directed by: Ben Hackworth
- Screenplay by: Bille Brown; Ben Hackworth
- Produced by: Lizzette Atkins; Raphael Cocks
- Starring: Radha Mitchell; Thomas Cocquerel; Nadine Garner; Odessa Young; Emm Wiseman
- Cinematography: Katie Milwright
- Edited by: Peter Carrodus
- Music by: Jackson Milas; Antony Partos
- Release date: 3 August 2018 (Melbourne International Film Festival)
- Running time: 105 minutes
- Country: Australia
- Language: English

Celeste is a 2018 Australian film directed by Ben Hackworth and written by Hackworth and Bille Brown. The film stars Radha Mitchell, Thomas Cocquerel, Nadine Garner and Odessa Young. The film had its international premiere at BFI London Film Festival and its world premiere at Melbourne International Film Festival.

== Plot ==
Celeste is an Australian film that revolves around the life of the titular character, portrayed by Radha Mitchell. Celeste, a renowned opera singer, was once considered a beloved figure in the Australian music scene. However, she chose to retire prematurely in order to be with the man she loved. They settled in a picturesque but deteriorating estate located in the heart of a rainforest in tropical North Queensland.

The narrative takes a poignant turn with the death of Celeste's husband. A decade later, Celeste, now ready to make a final comeback, seeks the assistance of her stepson, Jack, played by Thomas Cocquerel. Jack, still haunted by the past, responds to Celeste's call and arrives at the estate amidst the preparations for her comeback performance. He discovers that Celeste remains as he remembered her, and she expresses her desire for him to stay with her at the estate.

However, Celeste's request comes with a condition: Jack must fulfill one final task for her. As the film progresses, Celeste delves into the bohemian world of opera, providing viewers with a glimpse into this captivating and lesser-known aspect of the entertainment industry. The story unfolds against the backdrop of the rainforest in tropical North Queensland and Paronella Park, a crumbling mansion and real-life tourist destination.

== Cast ==
- Radha Mitchell as Celeste
- Thomas Cocquerel as Jack
- Nadine Garner as Grace
- Odessa Young as Rita
- Emm Wiseman as Cindy
- Aaron Davison as Stu

== Reception ==
=== Critical response ===
Review aggregator website, Rotten Tomatoes gave it 55% rating, based on 11 reviews. Neil Young of The Hollywood Reporter said, "Exuding a brittle wistfulness as a retired opera star planning one last comeback, Mitchell's forty-something Celeste nevertheless manages to combine elements of Norma Desmond and Blanche DuBois to absorbing effect." Sarah Ward from Screen International stated the film "follow in the footsteps of Rainer Werner Fassbinder’s great female-led films, but always taking the time to revel in the emotional details. It’s an approach that gives the film’s characters room to grow, and its performances along with them, immersing the audience in a heady mix of loss, love, loyalty, redemption and deep-felt yet ever-shifting bonds."

=== Accolades ===
Year	Award	Category	Result
2018	Adelaide Film Festival	Best Feature	Nominated
2019	Santa Barbara International Film Festival	Independent Cinema	Nominated
