= Jonny Pasvolsky =

Australian actor

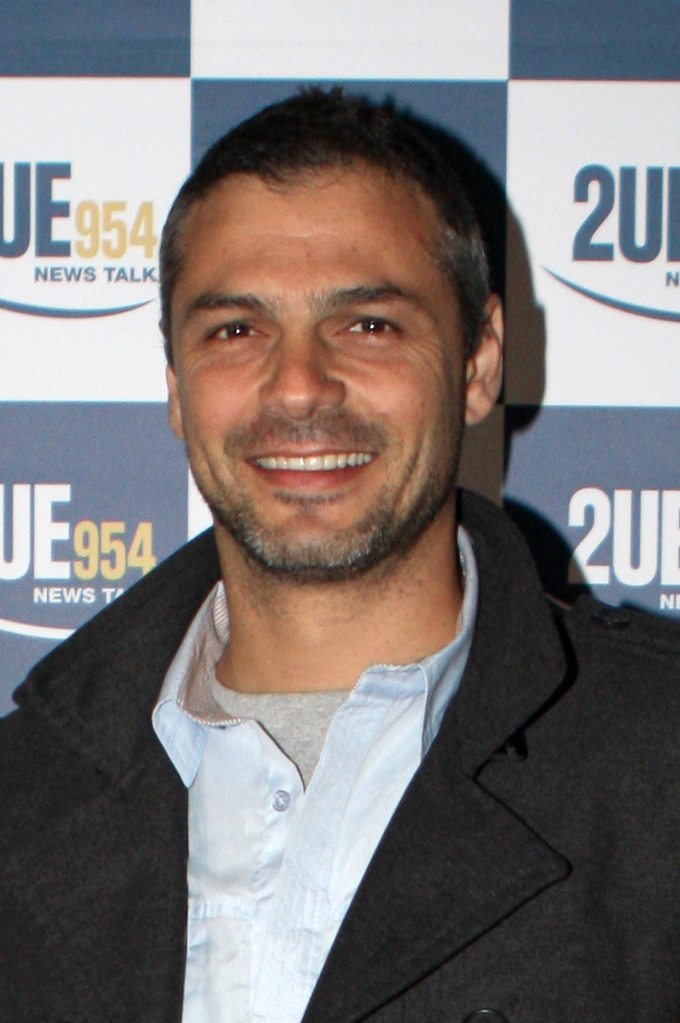
- Pasvolsky in 2011
- Born: Jonathan Marc Pasvolsky; 26 July 1972 (age 54); Cape Town, South Africa
- Occupation: Actor
- Spouse: Carolyn Pasvolsky
- Children: 3
- Website: http://jonnypas.com/

Jonathan Marc Pasvolsky (born 26 July 1972), also known as Jonny Pasvolsky, is a South African-born Australian actor.

== Early life and education ==
Pasvolsky was born on 26 July 1972, in Cape Town, South Africa, to a Jewish family. He was raised in Australia. He studied acting at the Victorian College of the Arts in Melbourne.

== Career ==
Pasvolsky is best known for his role (Rob Shelton/Matt Bosnich, 2005–2007) in McLeod's Daughters, which he received a nomination for "Most Popular New Male Talent" at the Logie Awards of 2006. He has also appeared in main cast roles in the Underbelly series, Underbelly: A Tale of Two Cities,The Moodys (ABC TV), Mr & Mrs Murder (Network 10), Picnic at Hanging Rock (series), Play School, Cops LAC, Second Chance (Network 10) and Farscape with guest star roles in hit TV series Westworld opposite Thandie Newton, The Secrets She Keeps (Paramount+), Miss Fisher’s Murder Mysteries, Blood Brothers, Home and Away, Young Lions, All Saints, White Collar Blue, Satisfaction, Rescue: Special Ops, Sea Patrol and Offspring. He starred as Mr. Hooper in Hey, Hey, It's Esther Blueburger and played Antonio Morelli in the UK.TV mini-series False Witness. He appeared in a starring role, as the moustached villain in the Johnny Depp 2015 film Mortdecai, played Richard Wolf in Rising Wolf / Ascendant, Henry in South Australian horror film Rabbit, Jonathan in Fatal Contact and Lennox in Jeffrey Wright’s Macbeth.

== Personal life ==
Pasvolsky and wife Carolyn have three children.

== Filmography ==
=== Television ===
| Year | Title | Role | Notes |
|---|---|---|---|
| 2000 | SeaChange | Head Waiter | Season 3, episode 12 |
| 2001 | Life Support | Man in XXX T-shirt | Season 1, episode 1 |
| 2002 | Young Lions | Daniel Crane | Season 1, episodes 4 & 6 |
| 2002 | All Saints | John Poulos | Season 5, episode 33 |
| 2003 | Farscape | Pennoch | Season 4, episodes 16, 20 & 21 |
| 2003 | White Collar Blue | Sal Olivato | Season 1, episode 21 |
| 2005–07 | McLeod's Daughters | Rob Shelton / Matt Bosnich | Season 5–6 (main role, 26 episodes) |
| 2005–07 | McLeod's Daughters | Rob Shelton / Matt Bosnich | Season 6, episode 32 (guest) |
| 2005–07 | McLeod's Daughters | Rob Shelton / Matt Bosnich | Season 7 (recurring, 8 episodes) |
| 2006 | Fatal Contact: Bird Flu in America | Governor Newsome's Aide | Miniseries (2 episodes) |
| 2008 | The Abominable Flatmate | Chuck Dudekof | TV series |
| 2008 | Satisfaction | Zoron | Season 2, episodes 4 & 5 |
| 2009 | False Witness (aka The Diplomat) | Antonio Morelli | Miniseries (2 episodes) |
| 2009 | Underbelly: A Tale of Two Cities | Detective Inspector Dave Priest | Season 2 (recurring, 10 episodes) |
| 2009 | Rescue: Special Ops | Karl Stevenson | Season 1, episode 7 |
| 2010 | Sea Patrol | Clarkson | Season 4, episode 3 |
| 2010 | Cops L.A.C. | Zac Butler | Season 1 (recurring, 9 episodes) |
| 2011 | Offspring | Ben Forbes | Season 2, episodes 1 & 2 |
| 2012 | Home and Away | Tim Graham | Season 25 (recurring, 7 episodes) |
| 2013 | Mr & Mrs Murder | Peter Vinetti | Season 1 (main role, 13 episodes) |
| 2013 | Miss Fisher's Murder Mysteries | Warwick Hamilton | Season 2, episode 2 |
| 2014 | The Moodys | Matt Capello | Season 1 (recurring, 5 episodes) |
| 2016 | Westworld | Bloody Jimmy | Season 1, episode 6 |
| 2018 | Picnic at Hanging Rock | Sgt Bumpher | Miniseries (5 episodes) |
| 2022 | The Secrets She Keeps | Crown Prosecutor | Season 2, episode 6 |
| 2023 | Home and Away | Detective Madden | Season 36 (recurring, 6 episodes) |

=== Film ===
| Year | Title | Role | Notes |
|---|---|---|---|
| 2003 | The Easter Tide | William | Short film |
| 2005 | Still Life | Brian | Short film |
| 2005 | Second Chance | Sergeant Sharp | TV movie |
| 2006 | Macbeth | Lennox | Feature film |
| 2008 | Hey Hey It's Esther Blueburger | Mr. Hooper | Feature film |
| 2008 | Blood | Tony Kovac | Short film |
| 2011 | Blood Brothers | Simon Kennedy | TV movie |
| 2015 | Mortdecai | Emil Strago | Feature film |
| 2017 | Rabbit | Henry | Feature film |
| 2018 | The Front Runner | Steve Dunleavy | Feature film |
| 2021 | Ascendant | Richard Wolf | Feature film |
| TBA | Other You | Casey | Feature film (post-production) |
