= Ascendant (2021 film) =

2021 film

- Directed by: Antaine Furlong
- Written by: Antaine Furlong; Kieron Holland
- Produced by: Drew Bailey; James M. Vernon; Kristy Vernon
- Starring: Charlotte Best; Jonny Pasvolsky; Alex Menglet
- Cinematography: Frank Flick
- Edited by: Jonathan Tappin
- Music by: David Hirschfelder
- Release date: 2021
- Running time: 102 minutes
- Country: Australia
- Languages: English, Russian, Mandarin

Ascendant, also known as Rising Wolf, is a 2021 Australian thriller film co-written and directed by Antaine Furlong.

== Plot ==
Aria Wolf is trapped in an elevator while her father is held hostage by Russian gangsters. She comes to realise she has extraordinary abilities.

== Cast ==
- Charlotte Best as Aria Wolf
- Jonny Pasvolsky as Richard Wolf
- Alex Menglet as Yaroslav
- Tahlia Sturzaker as Young Aria
- Karelina Clarke as Young Zara
- Susan Prior as Barbara Wolf
- Andrew Jack as Dr Thompson
- Lily Stewart as Zara Wolf
- Elsa Cocquerel as Chrissy
- George Burgess as Sergey
- John Harding as Nikolay
- Justin Cotta as Anton

== Reception ==
On review aggregator Rotten Tomatoes, the film has an approval rating of 40% based on 10 reviews.

Writing in The Australian David Stratton gave it 2 stars stating "The film is likely to prove as great an ordeal for the audience as it is for its luckless heroine." The Canberra Times's Ron Cerabona gives it a 3 star review noting "while sometimes hard to follow and with some contrived or implausible elements, is impressively atmospheric, well made and well acted." In New Zealand's Waikato Times James Croot give it 2 stars and finishes "Visually impressive, this Australian production may well lead to bigger things for the clearly talented Furlong, but narratively, it's a barely coherent mess that feels like a desperate cinematic placeholder until the global movie industry gets back up to speed."

Writing in Variety Richard Kuipers says "Promising ideas turn out to be mostly empty thought bubbles in “Rising Wolf,” a confusing and derivative Aussie combo of hostage thriller and sci-fi fantasy." Austin Chronicle's Trace Sauveur gave it 1 1/2 stars saying "Rising Wolf gets so caught up in the idea of a supposed potential franchise that it forgets to make you care about the film you're currently watching."

== Awards ==
- 11th AACTA Awards
  - AACTA Award for Best Sound - Angus Robertson, Peter Purcell, Phil Heywood, Scott Mulready - nominated
