= Three Forever =

1998 Australian television series

Three Forever is an Australian television series that first screened on SBS in 1998, with eight episodes produced.

Three Forever tells the story of three orphans, Danny, Frances and Paulie, who together are on a quest for happiness. Danny is searching for the mother who abandoned him at birth and feels like he is being continually rejected. Frances lost her parents in a tragic accident and now suddenly finds herself with strange powers. Paulie wants to be part of a loving family.

== Cast ==
- Justin Hardi as Danny
- Miranda Elliott as Frances
- Thomas Gilmore as Paulie
- Peta Toppano as Maria
- Steve Monaco as Rick's mate
- Susan Lyons as Martha Graves

== See also ==
- List of Australian television series
- The Girl from Steel City
