= Emilie Cocquerel =

Australian actress, filmmaker

- Born: Emilie Jane Cocquerel; Sydney, Australia
- Occupation: Actress
- Years active: 2013–present
- Website: Thomas Cocquerel (brother); Elsa Cocquerel (sister)

Emilie Jane Cocquerel is an Australian actress and mental health advocate. She earned a Daytime Emmy Award nomination for her performance as Sandy in the ABC Me series The New Legends of Monkey (2018–2020). She is also known for her roles in the film Mother Mountain (2022) and as Queen Alianor in the Netflix series The Letter for the King (2020).

== Early life and education ==
Cocquerel was born in Sydney to Australian mother Georgia and French father Patrick. Her older brother Thomas and younger sisters Elsa and Anna are also actors. She spent her early childhood in France and the United States before returning to Sydney in 2001, settling in the North Shore suburb of Warrawee.

Cocquerel began her studies at Sydney University where she participated in the Drama Society and later graduated with a Bachelor of Arts in Acting from the Western Australian Academy of Performing Arts in 2013. She also took a three month course at the Conservatoire national supérieur d'art dramatique (CNSAD) in Paris.

Having developed an interest in mental health care and social work, Cocquerel returned to university, graduating with a Bachelor of Social Science in Psychology from Swinburne University of Technology in 2019 followed by a Master of Counselling and Psychotherapy from the Australian College of Applied Psychology in 2021.

Emilie was also the lead actress on the music video for Australian band, Sons of the East's music video, Into The sun.

== Filmography ==
=== Film ===
Year	Title	Role	Notes
2013	Broken		Short film
2013	One Player	Lucy	Short film
2016	Joe Cinque's Consolation	Viola	
2016	Lion	Annika	
2016	Spirit of the Game	Emily	
2017	Hitchhiker	Vanessa Lutz	Short film
2019	Home	Lily	Short film
2022	Mother Mountain	Selene	Lead role

=== Television ===
Year	Title	Role	Notes
2013	An Accidental Soldier	Juliette	Television film
2018–2020	The New Legends of Monkey	Sandy	Main role
2020	The Letter for the King	Queen Alianor	5 episodes
2021	Drop Dead Weird	Savannah Lee	1 episode

== Stage ==
Year	Title	Role	Notes
2013	Hamlet	Osric	Subiaco Arts Centre, Leederville
2013	The Swell Party	Sara Murphy	Smock Alley Theatre, Dublin
2015	The Credeaux Canvas	Amelia	Seymour Centre, Sydney
2018	The Effect	Connie	Old Fitz Theatre, Woolloomooloo

== Awards and nominations ==
Year	Award	Category	Work	Result	Ref.
2021	Daytime Creative Arts Emmy Awards	Outstanding Performer in Children's Programming	The New Legends of Monkey	Nominated	
