= The Divorce Party =

- Film poster
- Directed by: Hughes William Thompson
- Written by: Mark Famiglietti; Lane Garrison
- Produced by: Ryan R. Johnson
- Starring: Thomas Cocquerel; Matilda Lutz; Claire Holt
- Cinematography: Marc Katz
- Edited by: Greg Babor; Brad McLaughlin
- Music by: Chloe Grace Baker
- Release date: February 8, 2019
- Running time: 93 minutes
- Country: United States
- Language: English

The Divorce Party is a 2019 American romantic comedy film directed by Hughes William Thompson and written by Mark Famiglietti and Lane Garrison. The film stars Thomas Cocquerel, Matilda Lutz, and Claire Holt.

== Production ==
Principal photography on the film began in November 2016 in Savannah, Georgia.
