= Mother Mountain (film) =

- Directed by: Celina Stang
- Written by: Celina Stang
- Produced by: Fran Dobbie; Kristen Hodges; Stavros Kazantzidis; Celina Stang
- Starring: Emilie Cocquerel; Fayssal Bazzi; Willow Speers; Damion Hunter; Anne-Louise Lambert
- Cinematography: Radek Ladczuk
- Edited by: Mark Warner
- Release date: 2022
- Running time: 105 minutes
- Country: Australia
- Language: English

Mother Mountain is a 2022 Australian film written and directed by Celina Stang.

== Plot ==
Selene and Dean move their family to the base of a sacred mountain looking for a new life.

== Cast ==
- Anne-Louise Lambert as Linda
- Emilie Cocquerel as Selene
- Fayssal Bazzi as Dean
- Pip Miller as Leonard Schwartz
- Willow Speers as Shani
- Dean Kyrwood as Andrew
- Lily Stewart as Matilda
- Damion Hunter as Jonah
- Jarrah Finnerman as Ren
- Steve Kilbey as Stevie
- Jaymie Knight as Cain
- Angeline Penrith as Mary

== Reception ==
Writing in the Weekend Australian, David Stratton gave it 3 1/2 stars saying "Tapping into two deeply-held faiths, Jewish and Aboriginal, two races that have suffered appallingly at the hands of Aryans, the film is steeped in cross-cultural themes. Handsomely photographed by Radek Ladczuk and confidently acted by the entire cast, this is a fresh and distinctive local production."

Jim Schembri gave it 3 stars calling it "A well-directed, intimate domestic drama, dramatically solid with a raft of good turns and a lovely location shoot".

Paul Malone reviewed it for AustralianCATHOLICS, concluding that it was "Striking to look at, emotionally involving, and challenging."
