= Andrew Jack (dialect coach) =

British dialect coach and actor (1944–2020)

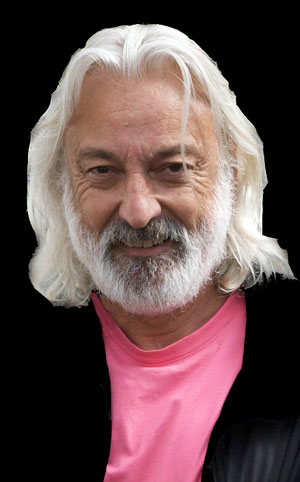
- Jack in 2011
- Born: Andrew Duncan Hutchinson; 28 January 1944; Finchley, London, England
- Died: 31 March 2020 (aged 76); Surrey, England
- Occupations: Dialect coach; actor
- Years active: 1957–2020
- Spouses: Felicity Hutchinson (m. 1974; div. 1987) Paula Jack (m. 2000; div. 2018) Gabrielle Rogers (m. 2019)
- Children: 2
- Website: andrewjack.com

Andrew Jack (born Andrew Duncan Hutchinson; 28 January 1944 – 31 March 2020) was a British dialect coach who worked on over 80 motion pictures.

== Early life ==
Jack was born in London. His father, Stephen Jack, was an actor in film, radio and television.

== Career ==
He had worked with over 200 actors including Robert Downey Jr. (in Richard Attenborough's Chaplin, Michael Hoffman's Restoration and Guy Ritchie's Sherlock Holmes), Pierce Brosnan (in GoldenEye, Tomorrow Never Dies and Die Another Day), Cate Blanchett, and Viggo Mortensen. As supervising dialect coach for The Lord of the Rings, he created the Middle-earth accents and taught them, along with Elvish and Black Speech, to the cast of the trilogy. He designed and taught the accents for the Greeks and Trojans in Wolfgang Petersen's Troy. He taught Evan Davis to speak with a Nottinghamshire twang. He was known for helping non-British actors to be more intelligible to the audience.

Jack can also be seen in the Star Wars film series portraying Resistance Major (later promoted to General) Caluan Ematt in Star Wars: The Force Awakens and Star Wars: The Last Jedi. He also voiced the character of Moloch in Solo: A Star Wars Story. The final film he was working on at the time of his death was The Batman, which was dedicated to him.

== Personal life ==
Jack was married to Felicity Filmore from 1974 to 1987, and to Paula Jack from 2000 to 2018; both marriages ended in divorce.

Jack's widow Gabrielle Rogers is also a voice, accent and dialect coach who first started working in the film, television and theatre industries as an actor in the 1980s. Rogers and Jack were married in 2019.

Jack is survived by his and Felicity’s children, Katherine b. 1978 and Rupert b. 1982 and two grandchildren.

== Death ==
Jack died on 31 March 2020 at the age of 76 from COVID-19. His wife Gabrielle Rogers wrote on Twitter:

"We lost a man today. Andrew Jack was diagnosed with coronavirus two days ago. He was in no pain, and he slipped away peacefully knowing that his family were all 'with' him."

== Filmography ==
Dialect work
| Year | Title | Position | Notes |
|---|---|---|---|
| 1982 | Nancy Astor | Dialect coach | |
| 1989 | Indiana Jones and the Last Crusade | Dialect coach | Uncredited |
| 1989 | The Ginger Tree | Dialect coach | |
| 1990 | The Gravy Train | Dialect coach | 4 episodes |
| 1991 | Robin Hood: Prince of Thieves | Dialect coach | |
| 1991 | A Demon in My View | Dialect coach | |
| 1992 | The Last of the Mohicans | Dialect coach | |
| 1992 | Chaplin | Dialect coach | |
| 1993 | 15: The Life and Death of Philip Knight | Dialect coach | |
| 1994 | Backbeat | Dialect coach | |
| 1994 | Nostradamus | Dialect coach | |
| 2001 | The Lord of the Rings: The Fellowship of the Ring | Dialect coach | Supervising |
| 2002 | The Lord of the Rings: The Two Towers | Dialect coach | Supervising |
| 2003 | The Lord of the Rings: The Return of the King | Dialect coach | Supervising |
| 2022 | The Batman | Dialect coach | Posthumous release |

Film
| Year | Title | Role | Notes |
|---|---|---|---|
| 2001 | Kate & Leopold | John A. Roebling | |
| 2009 | Sherlock Holmes | Professor Moriarty | Voice (lines later overdubbed by Jared Harris following the release of A Game of Shadows) |
| 2015 | Star Wars: The Force Awakens | Caluan Ematt | |
| 2017 | Star Wars: The Last Jedi | Caluan Ematt | |
| 2018 | Solo: A Star Wars Story | Moloch | Voice |
| 2021 | Ascendant | Doctor Thompson | Known as Rising Wolf; posthumous release |

Television
| Year | Title | Role | Notes |
|---|---|---|---|
| 1957 | Whack-O! | School Boy | 10 episodes |
| 1959 | BBC Sunday-Night Theatre | Boy | Episode: "Against the Stream" |
| 1966 | This Man Craig | Waiter | Episode: "A Wise Father" |
| 1968 | The Spanish Farm | Lt. Andrews | Episode: "Paris" |
| 1969 | Chronicle | Bosham | Episode: "Thomas Becket" |
| 1969 | Doctor in the House | Smoothie | Episode: "It's All Go..." |
| 1970 | The Black Tulip | Craeke | 1 episode |
| 1971 | Softly Softly: Task Force | Radley | Episode: "Company Business" |

Video games
| Year | Title | Role | Notes |
|---|---|---|---|
| 2016 | Lego Star Wars: The Force Awakens | Caluan Ematt | |
