= When Strangers Appear =

2001 film

- Directed by: Scott Reynolds
- Written by: Scott Reynolds
- Produced by: Sue Rogers
- Starring: Radha Mitchell; Barry Watson; Josh Lucas; Kevin Anderson
- Music by: Roger Mason
- Release dates: 21 July 2001 (Fantasia Festival); 22 January 2002 (United States)
- Running time: 96 minutes
- Countries: Australia; New Zealand; United States
- Language: English

When Strangers Appear is a 2001 psychological thriller film directed by Scott Reynolds and starring Radha Mitchell, Barry Watson, and Josh Lucas.

== Plot ==
When Beth (Mitchell) opens her remote roadside diner, she expects another slow day. But almost immediately, Jack (Watson), a handsome drifter bursts in, bleeding and on the run. Within moments, the three surfers Jack claims are chasing him appear and the stage is set for a deadly game of cat and mouse as Beth must decide who to trust.
