= Odessa Young =

Australian actress

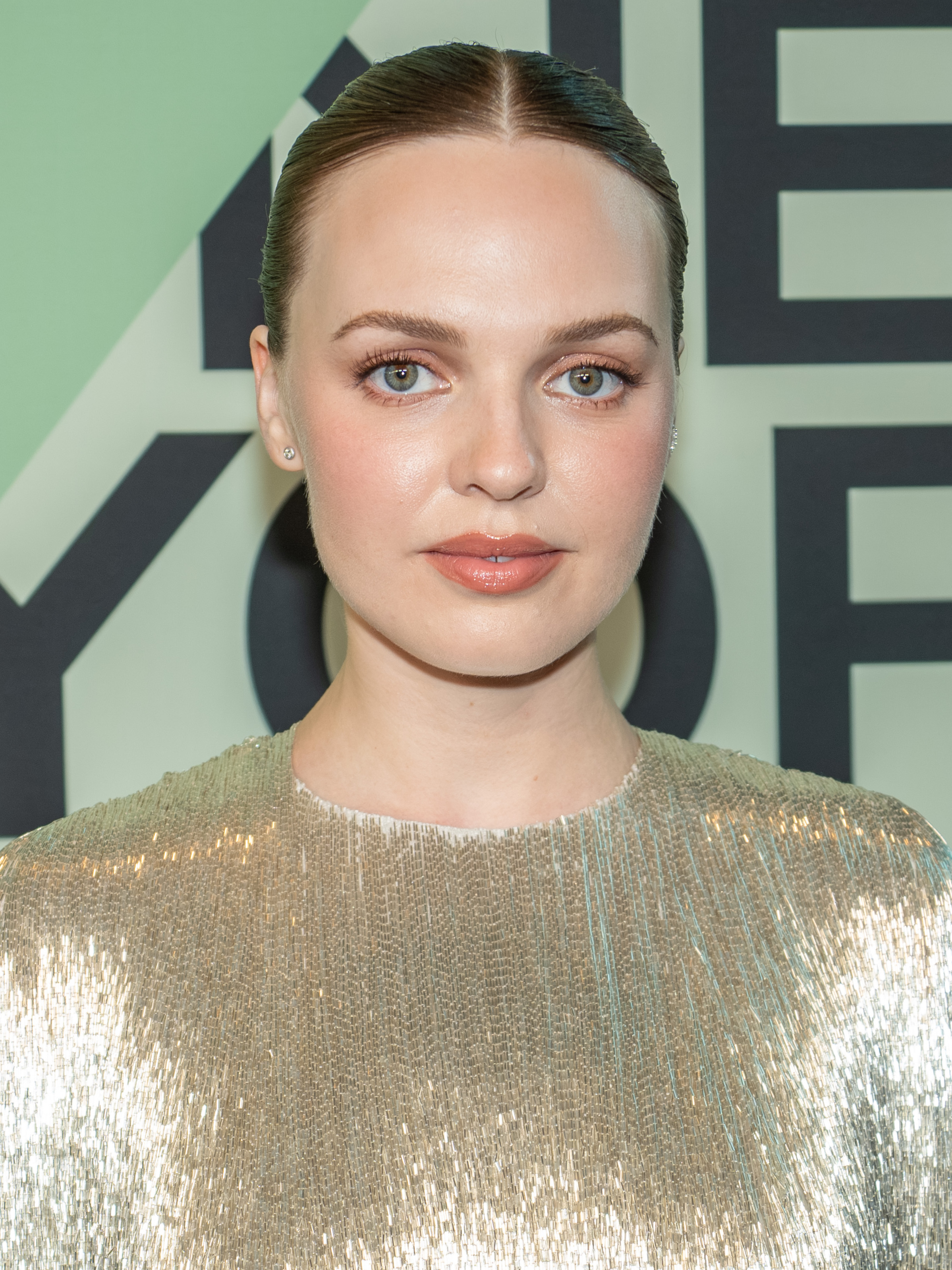
- Young in September 2025
- Born: January 11, 1998 (age 28); Australia
- Occupation: Actress
- Years active: 2007–present

Odessa Young (born January 11, 1998) is an Australian actress. She gained prominence through her roles in the Nine Network drama Tricky Business (2012) and the 2015 films Looking for Grace and The Daughter, the latter earning her an AACTA Award for Best Actress in a Leading Role. Her films since include Assassination Nation, A Million Little Pieces (both 2018), Shirley (2020), Mothering Sunday (2021) and Manodrome (2023). On television, she starred in the miniseries The Stand (2020).

== Early life and education ==
Young was born on 6 March 1998. She grew up in Australia, where her father Adam is a musician and her mother, Rachel, a writer. She started taking after-school acting classes at 11 years old. She attended a performing arts high school in Sydney, taking part in theatre productions. Within two days of turning 18, she relocated from Sydney to Los Angeles, California. Two years later, Young moved to Williamsburg, Brooklyn, New York.

== Career ==
=== 2009–2019 ===
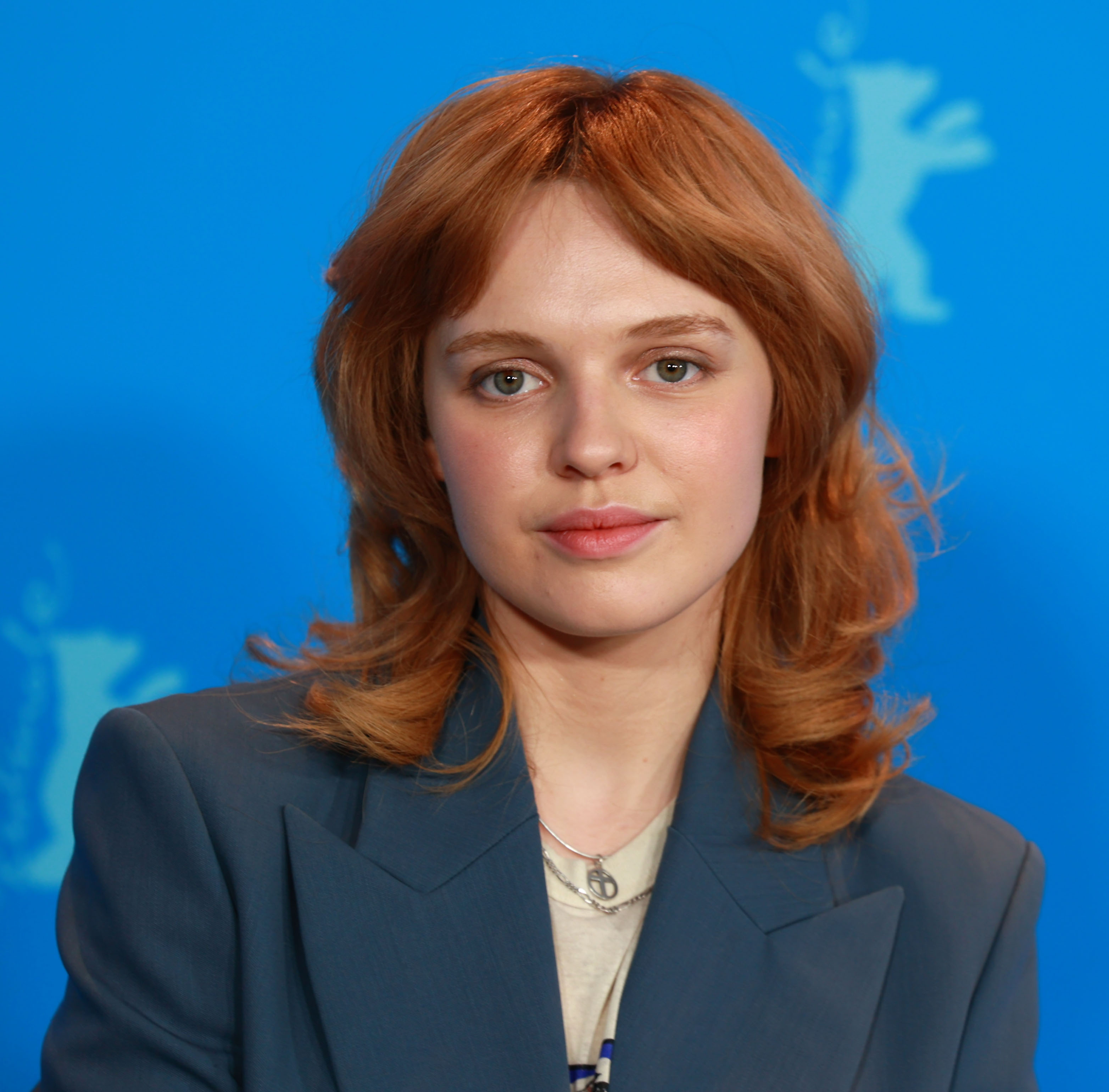
Young at the 2023 Berlin International Film Festival

Young started acting professionally at the age of 11, when she was cast through her drama teacher in the Australian children's show My Place. She acted in television series such as Wonderland and Tricky Business before making the transition into feature film work.

In 2015 she co-starred in the film The Daughter with Geoffrey Rush and Sam Neill. She was cast in the title role after modifying her take on the character to seem less mature than in her first audition. Also in 2015, she acted alongside Radha Mitchell in Looking for Grace, where she played the titular role. Later that year, she was dubbed "Australia's brightest rising star" by Elle Magazine. For her role in The Daughter, Young attracted considerable critical acclaim and won Best Actress in a Leading Role at the 2016 AACTA Awards. Her performance in The Daughter also earned her an award for Best Actress from the Australian Film Critics Association.

In 2016 she was in final negotiations to play the female lead in When the Street Lights Go On on Hulu, but the show was never picked up beyond pilot. In 2017, Young starred as Genevieve in the web series High Life; for her performance, she won an International Academy of Web Television Award for Best Lead Actress – Drama. In 2018, she won Best Actress at the 5th annual Vancouver Web Series Festival for her role in the same series. In 2018, she starred in the films Assassination Nation and A Million Little Pieces.

That year, she also made her off-Broadway debut in Days of Rage at the Tony Kiser Theater, where she plays the radical Quinn in 1969. She acted opposite Mike Faist, Tavi Gevinson, and Lauren Patten. In winter 2019, she starred in the Florian Zeller play The Mother at Atlantic Theater Company off-broadway as Emily. She acted alongside Isabelle Huppert, Chris Noth, and Justice Smith.

=== 2020–present ===
She was cast in miniseries The Stand in 2019. With The Stand, there were four shooting days before lockdown in Vancouver, with shooting picking up again later. Released in 2020, the series features Young as Frannie, with a "new coda co-written by King himself" that gives her a different portrayal than the book in the final episode.

In 2020, Young was cast as a hostess in the HBO Max television series Tokyo Vice, to be directed by Michael Mann and written by J. T. Rogers. She was subsequently replaced by Rachel Keller, when she pulled out of the production over scheduling conflicts related to the COVID-19 pandemic. In the 2020 film Shirley, Young plays Rose, a newly married young woman living in the same house as Shirley Jackson. Also in the same year, Young participated in Acting for a Cause, a live classic play and screenplay reading series created, directed and produced by Brando Crawford. Young played Lady Prism in The Importance of Being Earnest by Oscar Wilde. The reading raised funds for non-profit charities including Mount Sinai Medical Center.

Vogue named her one of six actors to watch in 2021. That year, she was also cast in the British film Mothering Sunday, in which she plays Jane Fairchild. In June 2024, Young was cast to play a love interest of Bruce Springsteen, played by Jeremy Allen White, in the film Deliver Me from Nowhere based on the book of the same name about the recording of Springsteen's 1982 album Nebraska.

== Acting credits ==
Key
†	Denotes films that have not yet been released

=== Film ===
Year	Title	Role	Notes	Ref.
2015	The Daughter	Hedvig Finch		
2015	Looking for Grace	Grace		
2017	Sweet Virginia	Maggie Russell		
2018	Assassination Nation	Lily Colson		
2018	A Million Little Pieces	Lilly		
2018	The Professor	Olivia Brown		
2018	Celeste	Rita		
2019	The Giant	Charlotte		
2020	Shirley	Rose Nemser / Paula		
2021	Mothering Sunday	Jane Fairchild		
2023	Manodrome	Sal		
2024	My First Film	Vita		
2024	The Damned	Eva		
2024	The Order	Zillah Craig		
2025	Springsteen: Deliver Me from Nowhere	Faye Romano		
TBA	The Liberation †	Jo Cooper	Post-production	

=== Television ===
Key
†	Denotes television productions that have not yet been released

Year	Title	Role	Notes	Ref.
2009	My Place	Alexandra Owen	1 episode	
2012	Tricky Business	Emma Christie	Main cast	
2013–2015	Wonderland	Lucy Wallace	3 episodes	
2014	The Moodys	Fran	1 episode	
2017	High Life	Genevieve	Web series	
2020–2021	The Stand	Frannie Goldsmith	Miniseries	
2022	The Staircase	Martha Ratliff	Miniseries	
2025	The Narrow Road to the Deep North	Amy Mulvaney	Miniseries	
2025	Black Rabbit	Gen	Miniseries	
TBA	Seven Sisters †	TBA	Upcoming series	
TBA	Rabbit, Rabbit †	TBA	Upcoming series	

=== Theater ===
Year	Title	Role	Playwright	Venue	Ref.
2018	Days of Rage	Quinn	Steven Levenson	Second Stage Theater, Off-Broadway	
2019	The Mother	Élodie	Florian Zeller	Atlantic Theater Company, Off-Broadway	

== Awards and nominations ==
Year	Association	Category	Nominated work	Result	Ref.
2016	AACTA Awards	Best Actress in a Leading Role	The Daughter	Won	
2017	International Academy of Web Television	Best Lead Actress – Drama	High Life	Won	
2018	Vancouver Web Series Festival	Best Actress	High Life	Won	
2026	Logie Awards	Best Actress in a Drama	The Narrow Road to the Deep North	Pending	
