= Elsa Cocquerel =

Australian actress, filmmaker

- Born: Elsa Georgia Cocquerel
- Years active: 2017–present
- Spouse: Elliot Scali (m. 2025)
- Children: 1
- Family: Thomas Cocquerel (brother); Emilie Cocquerel (sister)

Elsa Georgia Scali (née Cocquerel) is an Australian actress and model. She is known for her role as Michelle Scott in the Stan horror series Wolf Creek (2017), for which she was nominated for a Logie Award.

== Early life and education ==
Cocquerel was born to Australian mother and French father. Her brother Thomas and two sisters Emilie and Anna are also actors. Cocquerel attended Pymble Ladies' College. She began her studies in Fashion Design at the University of Technology Sydney. She returned to university to complete a Bachelor of Business in Marketing at Swinburne University of Technology in 2020.

She was a model before turning to acting in her early twenties.

== Filmography ==
Year	Title	Role	Notes
2017	Newness	Claire	
2017	Wolf Creek	Michelle Scott	4 episodes (season 2)
2018	A Low Hum	Mia	Short film
2019	The Other Guy	Annalisa	Episode: "The Escape Room"
2020	Bondi Slayer	Kara	Episode: "The Audition"
2021	Ascendant	Chrissy	
