= Assassination Nation =

2018 film by Sam Levinson

- Theatrical release poster
- Directed by: Sam Levinson
- Written by: Sam Levinson
- Produced by: David S. Goyer; Kevin Turen; Anita Gou; Matthew J. Malek; Manu Gargi; Aaron L. Gilbert
- Starring: Odessa Young; Suki Waterhouse; Hari Nef; Abra; Anika Noni Rose; Colman Domingo; Maude Apatow; Bill Skarsgård; Joel McHale; Bella Thorne
- Cinematography: Marcell Rév
- Edited by: Ron Patane
- Music by: Ian Hultquist
- Production companies: Bron Studios; Foxtail Entertainment; Phantom Four Films
- Distributed by: Neon; Gozie AGBO; Refinery29
- Release dates: January 21, 2018 (Sundance); September 21, 2018 (United States)
- Running time: 108 minutes
- Country: United States
- Language: English
- Budget: $7 million
- Box office: $2.9 million

Assassination Nation is a 2018 American satirical black comedy horror thriller film written and directed by Sam Levinson. It stars an ensemble cast led by Odessa Young, Suki Waterhouse, Hari Nef, and Abra. The film takes place in the fictional town of Salem, which devolves into chaos and violence after a computer hacker discovers and leaks personal secrets about many of its residents.

Development of the film began in October 2016, when it was announced as the independent label Foxtail Entertainment's first project. Casting announcements were made throughout 2017 and principal photography commenced in March 2017 and took place in New Orleans. Months later, Neon acquired the film rights with Gozie AGBO, before being joined by 30West and Refinery29.

Assassination Nation had its world premiere at the Sundance Film Festival on January 21, 2018, and was released theatrically in the United States on September 21. It grossed $2.8 million worldwide and received generally positive reviews from critics, who praised its "frenetic and visually stylish" action but criticized what were called thinly written characters.

== Plot ==
In the town of Salem, high school senior Lily Colson regularly hangs out with her three best friends, Bex Warren, and sisters Sarah and Em Lacey. They attend a party where Bex hooks up with her crush Diamond, while Lily hangs out with her boyfriend Mark, simultaneously texting a man known only as "Daddy" behind his back. After having sex, Diamond tells Bex to keep their hookup a secret, as Bex is transgender.

Marty, a casual hacker, receives a message from an unknown hacker containing pictures of Mayor Bartlett, a known anti-LGBTQ candidate, engaging with male escorts and dressing up in women's clothing, which Marty forwards to the entire town. Bartlett holds a press conference and fatally shoots himself in front of the crowd. Salem High's mild-mannered Principal Turrell is the next to be hacked, with pictures of his six-year-old daughter in the bath earning him accusations of pedophilia. He refuses to resign, intending to set things right for the students.

As the police question Marty about the hacks, half the town's private information is leaked. Daddy is revealed to be Sarah and Em's neighbor Nick Mathers, whom Lily used to babysit for. The lewd pictures and videos that Lily has sent to Nick are made public when his information is leaked. As a result, she is exposed and humiliated by Mark, and her parents disown her. After she is thrown out on the street, she is harassed by a man in a truck who films her before chasing her with a knife. Eventually, she stuns him with a shovel before seeking refuge in Sarah and Em's house.

A week later, most of the town has donned masks and taken up arms to exact revenge on those they think have wronged them. Nick, now leading a mob of masked vigilantes, captures Marty, whom they torture into admitting that Lily's IP address seemed to be the source of the hacks. Before executing Marty, they upload a video of his forced confession. The masked assailants track Lily to Sarah and Em's house, where all four girls are staying, and break in. Nance sacrifices herself to keep the raiders at bay, allowing Lily and Bex to escape. Meanwhile, led by Officer Richter, the mob drags Sarah and Em outside and forces them into a police car. Bex takes out one of the attackers with a nail gun and makes her way out onto the streets to find help, while Lily hides in Nick's house.

Nick pretends to help Lily before brandishing a knife, intending to rape her to death for causing the disintegration of his marriage. She incapacitates him and hides in the bathroom, where she discovers Marty's corpse. Nick bursts in, and after a brief struggle, Lily kills him with a razor blade. She discovers his large cache of weapons, which she uses to gun Richter down and rescue Sarah and Em. Meanwhile, Bex is captured by Diamond's best friend, Johnny, who tries to force Diamond to hang her as retribution for his humiliation. Bex convinces him to spare her, so Johnny has him tied up and forces him to watch when Lily, Em, and Sarah rescue her just in time. Once all his friends are eliminated in the ensuing skirmish, Johnny surrenders, and Diamond becomes free. Lily uploads a video proclaiming her innocence and urging everyone in Salem to stand up and fight back against their tormentors; she is soon joined by a crowd of victims who are suspected by the mob for wronging them with the hacks.

After the entire town destroys itself following a warlike riot between persecutors and their victims, Lily's younger brother Donny is revealed to be the mastermind behind the hacks. He is captured and convicted for cyberterrorism, murder, and invasion of privacy. When asked by his parents about the reason for his actions, Donny replies, "I don't know. For the lulz."

The Salem High marching band performs Miley Cyrus' "We Can't Stop" through the destroyed town littered with dead bodies and destroyed vehicles.

== Cast ==
- Odessa Young as Lily Coleson
- Suki Waterhouse as Sarah
- Hari Nef as Bex
- Abra as Em
- Anika Noni Rose as Nance
- Colman Domingo as Principal Turrell
- Maude Apatow as Grace
- Bill Skarsgård as Mark
- Joel McHale as Nick Mathers
- Bella Thorne as Reagan
- Cody Christian as Johnny
- Kathryn Erbe as Rebecca Coulson
- Susan Misner (credited as Susie Misner) as Rose Mathers
- Danny Ramirez as Diamond
- Kelvin Harrison Jr. as Mason
- Noah Galvin as Marty
- Joe Chrest as Lawrence
- Jeff Pope as Officer Richter
- Jennifer Morrison as Margie
- J. D. Evermore (credited as JD Evermore) as Chief Patterson
- Lukas Gage as Eric

In addition, Cullen Moss appears as Mayor Bartlett.

== Production ==
=== Development ===
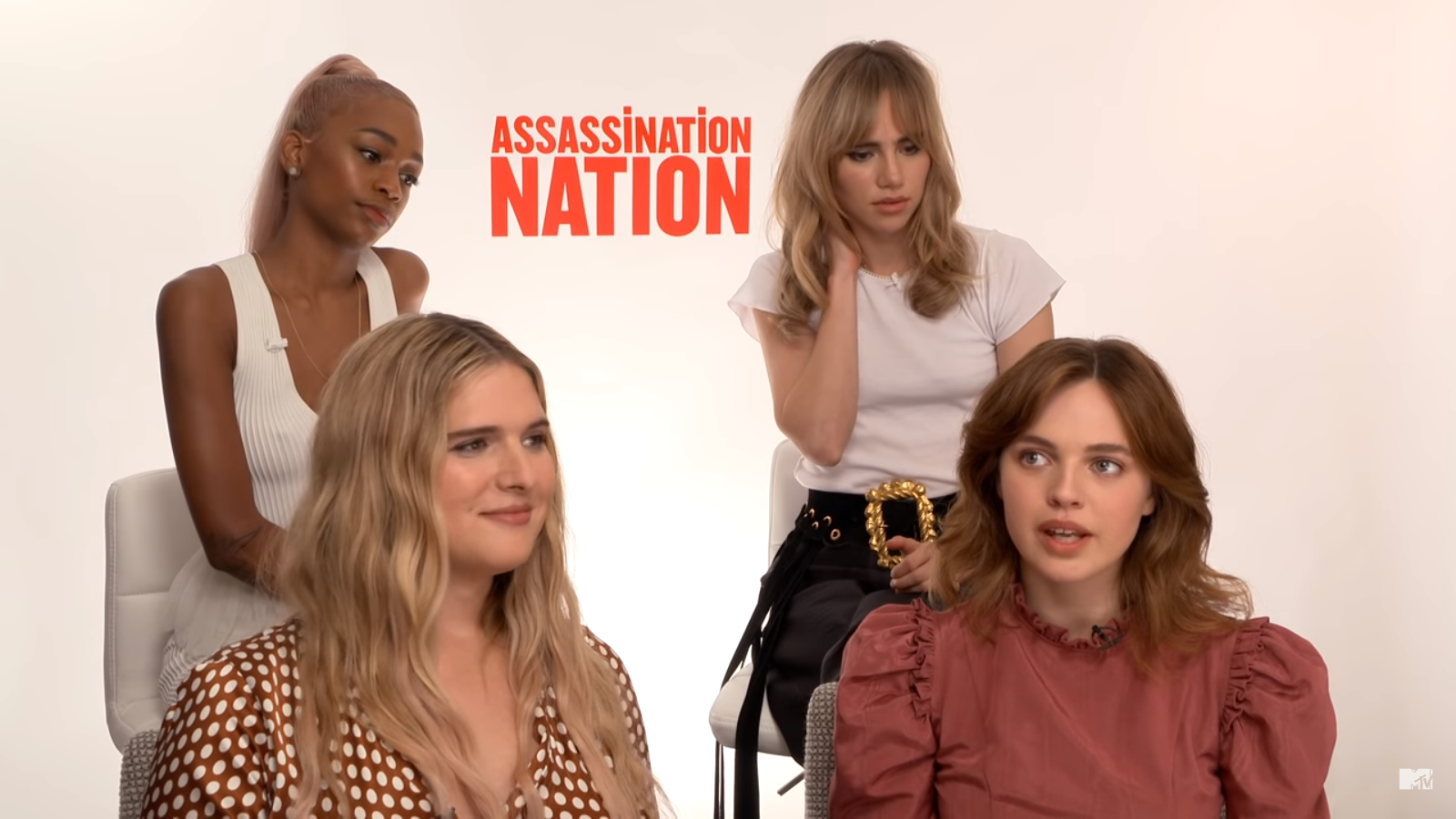
Abra, Suki Waterhouse, Hari Nef and Odessa Young in 2018

In October 2016, Matthew Malek and Anita Gou launched the independent label Foxtail Entertainment, with the duo announcing Sam Levinson's Assassination Nation as their first project; David S. Goyer and Kevin Turen joined them to produce the film. It is also produced by Bron Studios and Phantom Four Films, in association with Creative Wealth Media Finance.

=== Casting ===
In December 2016, Odessa Young, Suki Waterhouse, Hari Nef, and Abra joined the main cast of the film.

In March 2017, Bella Thorne, Maude Apatow, Bill Skarsgård, Joel McHale, Colman Domingo, and Noah Galvin joined the cast. The following month, Anika Noni Rose joined the cast.

=== Filming ===
Principal photography began in March 2017 in New Orleans. The sequence where the girls are attacked in Nance's home was shot in a single take using a crane.

=== Music ===
The film's score was written by Ian Hultquist, who stated that Levinson gave him "a completely blank slate" to work with, doing experimentations in "slowing down, and degrading audio but still somehow keeping it musical" and at a certain point composing an entire soundtrack written in the style of Ennio Morricone's Spaghetti Western work. Along with Morricone, Hultquist singled out influence from Marco Beltrami's soundtrack for Scream and Cliff Martinez's "dark synth stuff", as well as taking inspiration from pop songs by Air, Kanye West, Lana Del Rey, Migos, and BTS. A particular turning point for composition was when Levinson received from his friend Isabella Summers, who Hultquist also met as their bands Florence and the Machine and Passion Pit toured together, the song "Rage", which ended up in the soundtrack.

== Release ==
Assassination Nation had its world premiere at the Sundance Film Festival on January 21, 2018. After the premiere at Sundance, Neon acquired the distribution rights to the film. AGBO signed a deal with 30West, a company who acquired a majority stake in Neon, to co-distribute the film with Neon. In July 2018, Refinery29 also signed with Neon to co-distribute the film with them and AGBO.

The film was released in the United States on September 21, 2018, by Neon, Gozie AGBO, and Refinery29.

=== Home media ===
Assassination Nation was released digitally and on Blu-ray and DVD on December 18, 2018, by Universal Pictures Home Entertainment.

== Reception ==
=== Box office ===
Assassination Nation grossed $2 million in the United States and Canada, and $847,617 in other territories, for a worldwide total of $2.9 million.

In the United States, Assassination Nation was released alongside The House with a Clock in Its Walls, Life Itself, and Fahrenheit 11/9. The film was projected to gross around $4 million on its opening weekend from 1,403 theaters. It eventually debuted to $1 million, finishing 15th at the box office. Internationally, the film was released in only five European countries as a limited theatrical release.

Neon's chief Tom Quinn acknowledged the film's unsatisfactory box office performance, saying, "Sam Levinson has created a bold, visionary and ultimately cathartic response to the dumpster fire that is 2018. We're admittedly disappointed more people didn't come out this weekend, but those that did were loud and overwhelmingly positive. It's going to take more time for Assassination Nation to find its audience". Prior to the film release, analyst Jeff Bock compared the film to Heathers (1989), saying, "There's people out there who like these Heathers-type of films, but they tend to be more popular on home entertainment platforms" and "They're more likely to be cult favorites than big box office hits".

=== Critical response ===
On the review aggregator website Rotten Tomatoes, the film holds an approval rating of 74% based on 137 reviews, with an average of 6.7/10. The website's critics consensus reads, "Assassination Nation juggles exploitation and socially aware elements with mixed results, but genre fans may find it too stylish and viscerally energetic to ignore." On Metacritic, the film has a weighted average score of 54 out of 100, based on 28 critics, indicating "mixed or average" reviews. Audiences polled by PostTrak gave the film a 60% positive score and a 39% "definite recommend".

=== Accolades ===
| Award | Date of ceremony | Category | Recipient(s) | Result | Ref(s) |
|---|---|---|---|---|---|
| Toronto International Film Festival | September 16, 2018 | People's Choice Award: Midnight Madness, Second Runner Up | Assassination Nation | Won | |
| Sitges Film Festival | October 14, 2018 | Best Picture | Assassination Nation | Nominated | |
| Utopiales Film Festival | November 5, 2018 | Prix Utopia | Assassination Nation | Won | |
| Film Threat – Award This! | February 25, 2019 | Indie Cinematographer | Marcell Rév | Won | |
| Film Threat – Award This! | February 25, 2019 | Biggest Oscar Snub | Marcell Rév | Nominated | |
| Film Threat – Award This! | February 25, 2019 | Best Director | Sam Levinson | Nominated | |
