= Expecting (film) =

- Theatrical release poster
- Directed by: Jessie McCormack
- Written by: Jessie McCormack
- Produced by: Kathryn Himoff; Jessie McCormack; Erik Van Wyck
- Starring: Michelle Monaghan; Radha Mitchell; Jon Dore; Michael Weston; Mimi Kennedy
- Cinematography: Magela Crosignani
- Edited by: Nimrod Erez; Kathryn Himoff
- Music by: Mark Kilian
- Production companies: FilmColony; Unique New York Productions
- Distributed by: Tribeca Film
- Release dates: March 11, 2013 (SXSW); December 6, 2013 (United States)
- Running time: 87 minutes
- Country: United States
- Language: English

Expecting is a 2013 American comedy film written and directed by Jessie McCormack. The film stars Michelle Monaghan, Radha Mitchell, Jon Dore, Michael Weston and Mimi Kennedy. The film was released on December 6, 2013, by Tribeca Film.

== Plot ==
Andie calls her friend of many years very late one evening, and Lizzie's husband Peter finds her having breakfast in the morning. At their couples therapy session with Doctor Grayson, Peter complains that Andie knew that Leslie was planning a fourth IVF treatment before he did. She tells them they've made no progress and bore her.

Peter, a real estate agent, is frustrated by one particular wealthy, potential client who never is interested in the houses he shows him and always has someone different with him. Lizzie, on the other hand, is content with the one high school student she tutors.

Andie, who has inadvertently discovered she got pregnant after a recent one-night-stand, cannot go through with an abortion, so offers Lizzie and Peter the baby. He thinks it's a crazy idea. However, after her birthday, she stays over, Lizzie has Peter hear the heartbeat and he seems to agree to adopt Andie's baby.

Andie moves in, as she's all alone, but Peter isn't too happy about it. Right after she and Lizzie go for the first sonogram, Peter takes his brother Casey home from his fourth stint in rehab. As they are having a bbq in the backyard, he asks about the baby project. Since Peter has suggested the women not tell him yet, he tries to change the subject.

Casey suggests adoption, saying they shouldn't fear it as all adopted babies don't becomes addicts like him. Peter convinces Lizzie to let him stay, as the clinic suggests initially patients shouldn't be left alone. He then tries to take him out, but Casey feels like he's being constantly watched and claustrophobic.

As Peter still has not sold a property for awhile, tells Lizzie he can't pay the mortgage payment. Andie offers to borrow it from her dad. Initially refusing, Peter doesn't find another solution so begrudgingly accepts.

Lizzie and Peter go away to Palm Springs for the weekend. Initially wary of Casey, they get to know each other playing ping-pong etc. Just as the couple returns, they walk in on Andie and Casey fooling around. They freak out, Andie comments they perhaps would not be such good parents for her baby, so Casey finally finds out about her pregnancy.

Peter follows Casey to his apartment, as he feels responsible for him since their parents died. He drives him crazy, but the last straw is when the women ask for proof that Casey is STD-free.

All four of them go to Dr. Grayson's therapy session. At one point, Lizzie feels they are ganging up on her, so she loses her temper and abruptly leaves. The doctor calls it a breakthrough for her.

The guys head back to Casey's, but soon he soon tires of Peter. Insisting he doesn't want a roommate, he kicks him out after they have one of their tussles. Casey and Andie go for a brief walk with the dog Joyce when she's more than just showing and have a nice connection.

Lizzie secretly meets up Peter for a rendezvous in his hotel room. In her haste to leave home, she doesn't close the gate, and Joyce gets out. Everyone spends the rest of the day searching for her. Lizzie and Peter hash it out, and he admits having children never interested him.

Lizzie continues searching for Joyce, while Peter gets shit-faced. Casey is looking after his vomiting brother, while she gets the dog from a couple of potheads. Meanwhile, Andie goes into labor and calls Casey when Lizzie doesn't pick up. The guys pick her up for the hospital just before Lizzie and Joyce arrive.

The brothers help Andie through the delivery before Lizzie realizes she is in the hospital. Too late, Andie has bonded with the baby boy. Lizzie has to get used to living on her own with the dog, as Peter officially moves out. Casey recovers more fully this time.

Over six months later, Lizzie comes across Andie with little Gus. They are living with her father, whose young girlfriend is pregnant. The old friends have made peace.

== Cast ==
- Michelle Monaghan as Andie
- Radha Mitchell as Lizzie
- Jon Dore as Peter
- Michael Weston as Casey
- Mimi Kennedy as Dr. Grayson

== Release ==
The film premiered at South by Southwest on March 11, 2013. The film was released on December 6, 2014, by Tribeca Film.
