= Radha Mitchell =

Australian actress (born 1973)

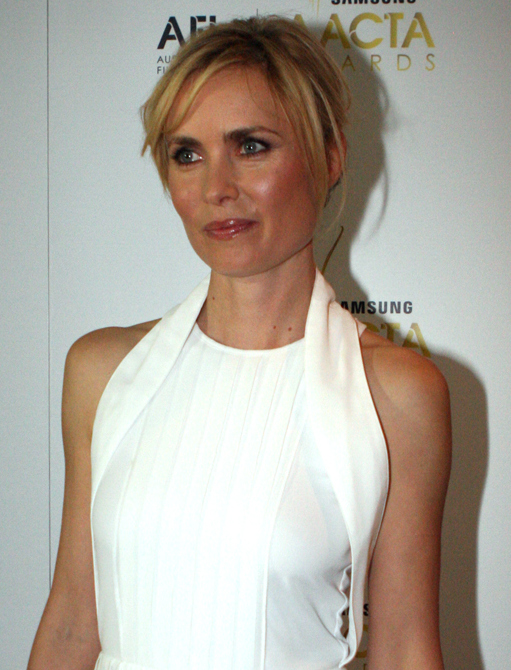
- Mitchell in 2012
- Born: Radha Rani Amber Indigo Ananda Mitchell; 12 November 1973 (age 52); Melbourne, Victoria, Australia
- Education: Swinburne University of Technology (BA)
- Occupation: Actress
- Years active: 1988–present

Radha Rani Amber Indigo Ananda Mitchell (born 12 November 1973) is an Australian actress. She began her career on television, playing Catherine O'Brien on the Australian soap opera Neighbours (1996–97), before transitioning to working in Hollywood. Known for her work in the action and thriller genres, she is the recipient of an FCCA Award, as well as nominations for Fangoria Chainsaw, AFI, and Screen Actors Guild Awards.

Mitchell's credits include supporting and leading roles in films such as High Art (1998), Pitch Black (2000), Phone Booth (2002), Man on Fire, Finding Neverland, Melinda and Melinda (all 2004), Mozart and the Whale (2005), Silent Hill (2006), Rogue (2007), Surrogates, The Waiting City (both 2009), The Crazies (2010), Olympus Has Fallen (2013), London Has Fallen (2016), The Darkness (2016), The Shack (2017), Celeste (2018), and Blueback (2022). Outside film, she played the recurring role of Kelly on ABC Television's Troppo (2022).

== Early life and education ==
She credits her name as being a result of her mother's experiences in India during the 1970s and her fascination with Indian philosophies. She grew up in Melbourne, just around the corner from the Como Centre—a multi-storey office, retail cinema and hotel complex, featuring the headquarters of Channel 10 Television—on Chapel Street, where her mother ran a shop. Mitchell attended St Michael's Grammar School in St Kilda. Her first credited screen role was that of an eleven-year-old girl from the Australian bush sent to live with her grandmother, on the ABC TV children's television series Sugar and Spice, which was broadcast between 1988 and 1989. Her experience in the series, along with the drama course she took at St Michael's, sparked her interest in acting. She then enrolled at Swinburne University of Technology, with the idea of becoming a psychologist. "I thought it was going to be group therapy, that we would go in there and talk about life and people and stuff like that. But it was all rats and stats. I didn't last beyond the first year." Instead, she obtained her Bachelor of Arts in literature and media studies.

== Career ==
=== 1990s ===
Mitchell played the recurring role of Jodie Ryan in the sitcom All Together Now (1992–1993), and guest-starred in R.F.D.S. (aka The Flying Doctors), Phoenix (1993), Law of the Land (1993) and Blue Heelers (1994–96). After obtaining a ten-episode arc as a parachute instructor in Neighbours in 1994, Mitchell returned to play the regular role of Catherine O'Brien, a strong-minded and opinionated student, from 1996 to 1997. The series brought the actress to a wider exposure from audiences.

Mitchell quickly "established herself as a versatile and accomplished fixture on the moody art-house flick circuit". As noted by The Guardian, she launched "her assault on the indie scene by 'cornering the market on the lesbian ingenue'". Her film debut came in the role of a gay University of Melbourne film student in the romantic comedy Love and Other Catastrophes (1996), which grossed US$1.6 million at the Australian box office. It was her next project, Lisa Cholodenko's Independent Spirit Award-winning independent drama High Art (1998), alongside Ally Sheedy, that gave Mitchell her first impression on American audiences. She was acclaimed for her performance of a young female intern at a magazine company who becomes involved with a drug-addicted lesbian photographer. Roger Ebert wrote that "High Art is so perceptive and mature it makes similar films seem flippant. The performances are on just the right note, scene after scene, for what needs to be done ...". IndieWire listed it as #7 of "The 15 Greatest Lesbian Movies of All Time", while Autostraddle listed it as #31 of "100 Best Lesbian Movies Of All Time" in 2015. She played one half of a house sitting couple in the psychological drama Cleopatra's Second Husband (also 1998).

In 1999, Mitchell starred as the former girlfriend of a lesbian make-up artist in the short drama Sleeping Beauties and as the pampered, bratty girlfriend of a champion rugby player in the drama Kick. While Sleeping Beauties premiered at the 1998 Sundance Film Festival and went on to play at over thirty film festivals, Kick had a brief cinema screening in Europe before it was released on DVD.

=== 2000s ===
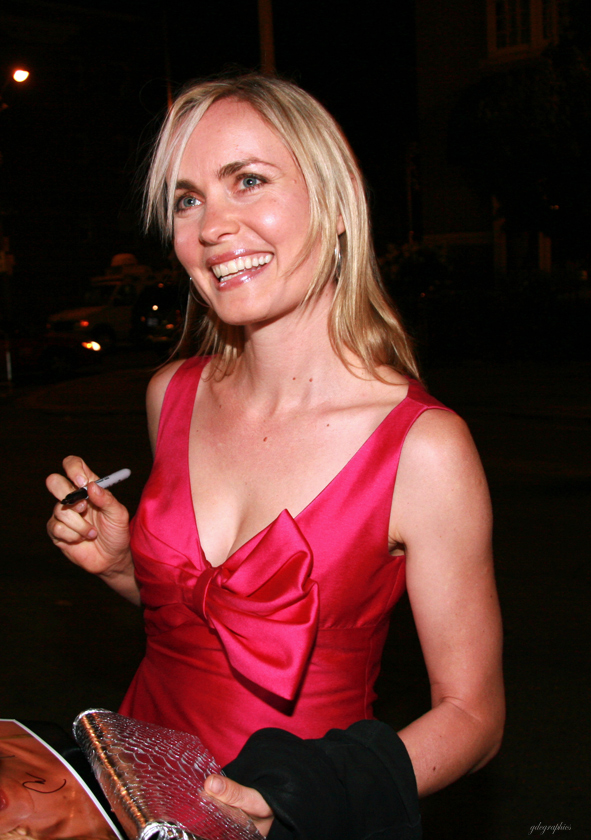
Mitchell at the Toronto International Film Festival 2009

Mitchell was cast as Carolyn Fry, a docking pilot, in the science fiction horror film Pitch Black (2000), opposite Vin Diesel. She found the experience of acting in a studio film "physically challenging", but was eager to take on the role, explaining: "Well, it's an interesting script, great character, shot in Australia, get to go home, you know, a whole range of reasons. And because I guess it's not something I would often have the opportunity to do; it's a genre piece and I felt it was an opportunity to learn". Despite mixed reviews from critics, the film was a sleeper hit, grossing over US$53 million worldwide and developing its own cult following. In 2000, she also starred as an expecting mother in the psychological drama Everything Put Together, which was nominated for the Grand Jury Prize at the Sundance Film Festival, and as the love interest of a lawyer in the romantic comedy Cowboys and Angels .

In 2001, Mitchell played a woman giving monologues to camera in the drama Ten Tiny Love Stories, a diner waitress in the comedy Nobody's Baby and the owner of a remote roadside diner in the thriller When Strangers Appear. Her next film release was the crime drama Dead Heat (2002), in which she played the wife of a police officer. Joel Schumacher's thriller Phone Booth (2003), opposite Colin Farrell, featured her as the wife of a young arrogant publicist who becomes a victim of a mysterious caller who threatens to harm him. It was a critical and commercial success, grossing US$97.8 million worldwide. She starred as the first woman to sail around the world solo in the horror film Visitors (also 2003).

Her three 2004 film releases —Man on Fire (2004), with Denzel Washington, the Academy Award–winning Finding Neverland, with Johnny Depp and Kate Winslet, and Woody Allen's Melinda and Melinda— were well received by critics and successful at the box office. In Man on Fire, she played the mother of a nine-year-old abducted in Mexico City and what Houston Chronicle described as an "American trophy wife with a Southern accent that seems to come and go". Finding Neverland featured her as Mary Ansell, the wife of novelist J.M. Barrie, and earned her, as a member of the cast, a Screen Actors Guild Award nomination for Outstanding Cast in a Motion Picture. Melinda and Melinda starred her as the title role of a woman attempting to straighten out her life. Man on Fire made US$130.2 million, Finding Neverland $116.8 million, and Melinda and Melinda US$20 million in limited markets.

In Mozart and the Whale (2005), a romantic dramedy with Josh Hartnett, Mitchell played a woman with Asperger syndrome. In its review for the film, Variety noted: "Mitchell socks over her role as a dynamo whose emotional insecurity is buried under a fabulously attractive exterior; by virtue of her character's assertiveness, she dominates the screen".

In Silent Hill (2006), the adaptation of Konami's 1999 video game of the same name, Mitchell portrayed Rose Da Silva, the desperate mother who seeks a cure for her daughter Sharon's nightmarish sleepwalking by taking her to the town of Silent Hill. James Berardinelli noted: "Radha Mitchell normally does smaller movies, but her experience from Pitch Black serves her well here; she's credible as a mother who will fight off hoards of dead to save her daughter". Despite mixed reviews, the film opened with top numbers at the box office, with over US$20 million in sales. It eventually made US$97 million globally. In 2006, she also appeared as the adoring wife of a nuclear reprocessing facility worker in the HBO film Pu-239.

In 2007, Mitchell starred in Robert Benton's romantic dramedy Feast of Love, opposite Greg Kinnear and Morgan Freeman, as a successful realtor carrying on an affair with a married man, and in the horror film Rogue, with Michael Vartan, as a wildlife researcher fighting a giant, man-eating crocodile. Both Feast of Love and Rogue made about US$5 million worldwide. In 2008, she took on the roles of a mother to a mute seven-year old in the dramedy Henry Poole Is Here opposite Luke Wilson, and that of a courageous nurse assisting British journalist George Hogg in the historical war drama The Children of Huang Shi opposite Jonathan Rhys-Meyers. In 2009, she played a woman kidnapped by the Russian mafia in the heist action film Thick as Thieves (aka The Code), which reunited her with Morgan Freeman, and in the sci-fi thriller Surrogates, also as an FBI agent, a film adaptation of the comic book of the same name co-starring Bruce Willis.

=== 2010s ===
The horror film The Crazies (2010) featured Mitchell as a pregnant woman and one of the residents of a fictional Iowa town that becomes afflicted by a military virus that turns those infected into violent killers. The film garnered positive reviews and, with a worldwide gross of US$55 million, it emerged as a moderate commercial success. In 2010, she also starred as a successful, self-starting lawyer and one half of a couple trying to adopt a child in Claire McCarthy's drama The Waiting City, which was acclaimed by critics. The Sydney Morning Herald asserted: "Featuring standout performances from Mitchell and Edgerton, this is an example of what Australian films can and should be, thought provoking, entertaining and stunning to behold". For her role, Mitchell won as Best Actress at the Antipodes Film Festival in Saint Tropez, France.

Mitchell reprised her role of Rose Da Silva in Silent Hill: Revelation (2012), which was a moderate box office success, grossing over US$56 million worldwide, but was heavily panned by critics and audiences, Her next seven screen projects —the films Big Sur, Olympus Has Fallen, Evidence, The Frozen Ground, Standing Up, Expecting and the ABC drama series Red Widow— were released throughout 2013. Olympus Has Fallen, in which she portrayed a nurse and the wife of a Secret Service agent, proved to be her most successful film of the year, grossing US$170.3 million globally, and spawning a film trilogy. In Fugly! (2014), a comedy written by and starring John Leguizamo, Mitchell played a neurotic uptown girl and the love interest of an unattractive man rejected by women because of his donkey-faced appearance.

In Looking for Grace (2015), a drama screened in the main competition section of the 72nd Venice International Film Festival, Mitchell starred as a mother hiring a private detective in an attempt to find her missing daughter. Her comic portrayal was hailed as "amusingly tetchy" by Variety and "well-tuned" by Time Out Sydney.

In 2016, Mitchell returned to the Fallen trilogy in London Has Fallen, which made US$205.9 million, and took on the roles of the matriarch of a family who brings home a supernatural force from the Grand Canyon in the horror film The Darkness, an obstetrician living in the remote Shetland Islands in the thriller Sacrifice, as well as that of one half of a couple in the short film Whoever Was Using This Bed. The Christian drama The Shack (2017), which featured Mitchell as a devoutly religious wife, opened with US$16.1 million in North America, finishing above expectations. It eventually earned US$96.9 million worldwide.

In August 2024, Mitchell was named in the cast of Disney Plus series Last Days of the Space Age.

== Filmography ==
=== Film ===
Year	Film	Role	Notes	Ref.
1996	Love and Other Catastrophes	Danni		
1998	High Art	Syd		
1998	Cleopatra's Second Husband	Sophie		
1999	Sleeping Beauties	Cindy	Short film	
1999	Kick	Tamara Spencer		
2000	Everything Put Together	Angie		
2000	Pitch Black	Carolyn Fry		
2000	Cowboys and Angels	Jo-Jo		
2001	Ten Tiny Love Stories	Herself		
2001	Nobody's Baby	Shauna Louise		
2001	When Strangers Appear	Beth		
2002	Dead Heat	Charlotte LaMarr		
2002	Phone Booth	Kelly Shepard		
2002	Four Reasons	Girl		
2003	Visitors	Georgia Perry		
2004	Man on Fire	Lisa Martin Ramos		
2004	Finding Neverland	Mary Ansell Barrie		
2004	Melinda and Melinda	Melinda		
2005	Mozart and the Whale	Isabelle Sorenson		
2006	Silent Hill	Rose Da Silva		
2006	Pu-239	Marina		
2007	Feast of Love	Diana Croce		
2007	Rogue	Kate Ryan		
2008	Henry Poole Is Here	Dawn Stupek		
2008	The Children of Huang Shi	Lee Pearson		
2008	What We Take from Each Other	Thief of Hearts	Short film	
2009	Thick as Thieves	Alexandra Korolenko		
2009	Surrogates	Agent Jennifer Peters		
2009	The Waiting City	Fiona Simmons		
2010	The Crazies	Judy Dutton		
2012	Silent Hill: Revelation	Rose Da Silva		
2012	Big Sur	Carolyn Cassady		
2013	Olympus Has Fallen	Leah Banning		
2013	The Frozen Ground	Allie Halcombe		
2013	Standing Up	Meg Golden		
2013	Expecting	Lizzie		
2013	Evidence	Detective Burquez		
2014	Bird People	Elisabeth Newman		
2014	Fugly!	Lara Perry		
2015	Looking for Grace	Denise		
2016	London Has Fallen	Leah Banning		
2016	The Darkness	Bronny Taylor		
2016	Whoever Was Using This Bed	Iris	Short film	
2016	Sacrifice	Tora Hamilton		
2017	The Shack	Nan		
2018	Swinging Safari	Jo Jones		
2018	Celeste	Celeste		
2018	The World Without You	Lily		
2020	The Homewrecker	Radha		
2020	Dreamkatcher	Gail		
2020	2 Hearts	Leslie		
2020	Run Hide Fight	Jennifer Hull		
2022	Girl at the Window	Barbara Poynton		
2022	Asking for It	Sal		
2022	Devil's Workshop	Eliza		
2022	Blueback	Dora Jackson		
2024	Take My Hand	Laura		
2026	The Gardener	Sabena		
2026	Seven Snipers	Voodoo Child		
2026	Bad Day at the Office	Molly		

=== Television ===
Year	Title	Role	Notes
1988–89	Sugar and Spice	Pixie Robinson	20 episodes
1992–93	All Together Now	Jodie	6 episodes
1993	Phoenix	Joanna	Episode: "Deal or Pay"
1993	R.F.D.S.	Tracey	2 episodes
1994, 1996	Blue Heelers	Sally-Anne / Nerida Davidson	3 episodes
1994, 1996–97	Neighbours	Cassandra Rushmore, Catherine O'Brien	69 episodes
1995	Halifax f.p.	Sarah	Episode: "My Lovely Girl"
1999	The Movie Show	Herself	1 episode
2013	Red Widow	Marta Walraven	8 episodes
2017	Longmire	Alex Graham	Episode: "Burned Up My Tears"
2018	The Romanoffs	Victoria Hayward	Episode: "Panorama"
2020	Law & Order: Special Victims Unit	Luna Prasada	Episode: "Swimming with the Sharks"
2024	Last Days of the Space Age	Judy Bissett	8 episodes

==== TV films, specials, and miniseries ====
Year	Title	Role	Notes
1998	The Chosen	Sarah Gordon	
2001	Uprising	Mira Fuchrer	

== Awards and nominations ==
Institution	Year	Category	Work	Result
Australian Film Institute	2006	Best Actress in an International Film	Silent Hill	Nominated
Antipodean Film Festival	2010	Best Actress	The Waiting City	Won
Evolution Mallorca International Film Festival	2019	Best Actress	Celeste	Nominated
Fangoria Chainsaw Awards	2001	Best Actress	Pitch Black	Nominated
Fangoria Chainsaw Awards	2004	Best Actress	Visitors	Nominated
Fangoria Chainsaw Awards	2006	Best Heroine	Silent Hill	Nominated
Film Critics Circle of Australia	2004	Best Actress	Visitors	Nominated
Film Critics Circle of Australia	2011	Best Actress	The Waiting City	Nominated
Film Critics Circle of Australia	2017	Best Actress	Looking for Grace	Won
Inside Film Awards	2011	Best Actress	The Waiting City	Nominated
Ischia Film Festival	2019	Best Actress	Celeste	Won
Screen Actors Guild Awards	2005	Outstanding Performance by a Cast in a Motion Picture	Finding Neverland	Nominated
