= Wolf Creek (franchise) =

Australian-American horror film franchise

- Official franchise logo
- Based on: Characters created by Greg McLean
- Starring: John Jarratt; Various actors (See below)
- Production company: Emu Creek Pictures
- Distributed by: Roadshow Films
- Countries: Australia; United States
- Language: English
- Budget: >$2,800,000
- Box office: $45,220,389 (2 films)

The Wolf Creek franchise consists of Australian horror installments, including two limited theatrical releases, and its follow-up television series, a theatrical legacy sequel movie in post-production, as well as two prequel novels. The franchise includes characters created by Greg McLean which are inspired by the separate real-life backpacking murders committed by Ivan Milat and Bradley John Murdoch. The plot centres on a variety of tourists from various nationalities and backgrounds, who come into contact with a psychopathic serial killer named Mick Taylor and known as "The Outback Killer". Each installment follows their struggles to survive, while he proceeds to sadistically attempt to hunt, torture, and assault his victims.

Though the movies received mixed critical reception, they notably turned a profit at the box office through their international ticket sales. The franchise has accumulated fans through the years since its release, earning a designated status as cult classics of the horror film genre.

== Films ==
Film	Australian release date	Director	Screenwriter(s)	Producers
Wolf Creek	24 January 2005	Greg McLean	Greg McLean	David Lightfoot and Greg McLean
Wolf Creek 2	20 February 2014	Greg McLean	Greg McLean & Aaron Sterns	Helen Leake, Greg McLean and Steve Topic
Wolf Cre3k	19 March 2027	Sean Lahiff	Duncan Samarasinghe	Greg McLean, Bianca Martino, Jeremy Bolt, and Kristian Moliere

=== Wolf Creek (2005) ===
English tourists Liz Hunter and Kristy Earl begin their backpacking trip through Australia with their local friend Ben Mitchell. As they travel to their next destination, the friends stop at the Wolfe Creek National Park. Upon returning to their vehicle however, they find that it will no longer start. As the sun sets, a man named Mick Taylor offers to take them to his nearby camp and tow their car to help repair it. Hours later the friends arrive at an abandoned mining site, where Mick feigns working on their car and tells the group stories about his past.

After Mick gives the trio some water, Liz awakens gagged and tied up in a shed. Breaking free and realizing that they have been drugged, she becomes determined to free her friends as she hears Kristy being tortured nearby. As the three attempt to escape, they begin to discover that Mick had followed them long before they arrived at Wolfe Creek, realizing that he is a serial killer with a number of other vehicles and belongings in his possession from other victims.

=== Wolf Creek 2 (2013) ===
Mick Taylor continues his murderous pursuits of various victims, while a German couple named Rutger Enqvist and Katarina Schmidt hitchhike through Australia. The couple arrives at Wolfe Creek National Park and set up camp for the night. Mick arrives and offers them a ride to a designated campsite so they are not found liable for being in a National Park after dark. Angered by Rutger's rejection, a struggle ensues wherein Mick murders Rutger. Tying Katarina up, Mick states that she will be his prisoner for the next several months, making sexual references, before strangling Katarina until she is unconscious.

Later that night, she awakens to see Mick dismembering the corpse of Rutger and flees into the wilderness. Mick gives chase in what he nefariously calls a game of hide-and-seek. She is rescued at a nearby highway by an English tourist named Paul Hammersmith, before Mick soon continues his pursuit of the new duo. As Mick accidentally murders his desired prey and realises his efforts to capture and sexually torture her were for naught, he decides to enact revenge through a game of cat and mouse by hunting Paul instead. Initially evading the murderer, Paul finds himself fighting for his life through an unrelenting series of attempts by the serial killer.

=== Wolf Cre3k (2027) ===
In August 2024, it was announced that a third film, titled Wolf Creek: Legacy, was in development, with John Jarratt reprising the central villainous role as Mick Taylor / The Outback Killer. Directed by Sean Lahiff with a script written by Duncan Samarasinghe, the plot will centre around a family of American tourists who unintentionally find themselves in Mick Taylor's hunting grounds. After the parents sacrifice themselves attempting to dissuade his pursuits, the children find themselves traversing the vast Australian outback alone while they are being hunted by a murderous serial killer. Franchise creator Greg McLean will serve as producer, alongside Jeremy Bolt, Kristian Moliere, and Bianca Martino.

By February 2025, Cineverse and Bloody Disgusting had joined the production as distributing companies for the North American release. Principal photography was announced to commence later in the same year, while release was set for late 2026. Jay Ryan and Laura Gordon joined the cast in undisclosed roles.

On 19 November 2026, the title of the film was revealed to be Wolf Cre3k, and a theatrical release date of 19 March 2027 was set.

== Television ==
Series	Season	Episodes	Originally released	Network	Showrunner
Wolf Creek	1	6	12 May 2016	Stan	Greg McLean
Wolf Creek	2	6	15 December 2017	Stan	Greg McLean

=== Wolf Creek (2016–2017) ===
The television series is a continuation of the plot established in the movies, following additional murderous actions by the serial killer Mick Taylor; where John Jarratt reprises his role as the villain.

The plot for season one centred around an American college student named Eve Thorogood who vacations in Australia with her family in an attempt to cope with her drug addiction. They initially enjoy their adventures before coming into contact with the serial killer Mick Taylor. As the sole survivor of his attack, Eve seeks the reluctant help of Det. Sullivan Hill and, despite contrary advice, remains in Australia and plans what becomes a format of her hunter-becomes-hunted revenge. Through the episodes of the series, the villain's backstory is explored including events of his childhood.

The plot for season two centres around Mick's realization that his murdering rampage as a serial killer may be coming to a close, as local law enforcement investigate the variety of deaths that have happened in his area. He soon encounters a group of international tourists who are embarking on a guided trip through the Australian outback. The driver of the tour bus named Davo, is responsible for all of the crew which includes: a German couple Oskar and Nina, and their daughter Emma; American couple Rebecca and Danny; Canadian friends Kelly and Michelle; American military veteran Bruce; English psychologist Brian; an Australian named Wade; a New Zealander named Ritchie; and a gay Australian couple Johnny and Steve. As Mick begins his murderous ways with each passenger one-by-one, he soon discovers a variety of professional backgrounds are onboard. Their variety of experience proves to be a different challenge for him with former-military, geology, genetics, building, and forensic psychology among its passengers. As the number of deaths begin to rise, Rebecca rallies the remaining survivors who try to fight for their lives and thwart his nefarious plans.

The series was well received in its capacity as a sequel, and called a worthy successor to the movies by critics.

== Main cast and characters ==
List indicators

This section includes characters who will appear or have appeared in the franchise in main roles.

- An empty grey cell indicates the character was not in the film, or that the character's official presence has not yet been confirmed.
- ^{C} indicates a cameo role.
- ^{V} indicates a voice-only role.

Character	Films			Television series	
Character	Wolf Creek	Wolf Creek 2	Wolf Cre3k	Wolf Creek	
Character	Wolf Creek	Wolf Creek 2	Wolf Cre3k	Season 1	Season 2
Mick Taylor The Outback Killer	John Jarratt	John Jarratt	John Jarratt	John Jarratt	John Jarratt
Liz Hunter	Cassandra Magrath				
Kristy Earl	Kestie Morassi				
Ben Mitchell	Nathan Phillips				
Paul Hammersmith		Ryan Corr			
Katarina Schmidt		Shannon Ashlyn			
Rutger Enqvist		Philippe Klaus			
Senior Sergeant Gary Bulmer Jr.		Shane Connor			
Constable Brian O'Connor		Ben Gerrard			
TBA			Jay Ryan		
Belinda Peterson			Laura Gordon		
Justin Peterson			Stacy Clausen		
Adam Peterson			Ditch Davey		
Em Peterson			Charli Penton		
Eve Thorogood				Lucy Fry	
Det. Sullivan Hill				Dustin Clare	
Roland Thorogood				Robert Taylor	
Ingrid Thorogood				Maya Stange	
Bernadette O'Dell				Deborah Mailman	
Inspector Darwin				Damian De Montemas	
Fatima Johnson				Miranda Tapsell	
Rebecca Michaels					Tess Haubrich
Danny Michaels					Charlie Clausen
Brian					Matt Day
Oskar Webber					Julian Pulvermacher
Nina Webber					Felicity Price
Emma Webber					Josephine Langford
Kelly Yeoman					Laura Wheelwright
Michelle Scott					Elsa Cocquerel
Bruce Walker					Christopher Kirby
Wade Cheti					Elijah Williams
Ritchie					Stephen Hunter
Ian "Davo" Davidson					Ben Oxenbould
Johnny Rossi					Adam Fiorentino
Steve Cham					Christopher Kirby

== Additional production and crew details ==
Film	Crew/Detail					
Film	Composer(s)	Cinematographer	Editor(s)	Production companies	Distributing companies	Running time
Wolf Creek	Frank Tétaz	Will Gibson	Jason Ballantine	Film Finance Corporation Australia, South Australian Film Corporation, 403 Productions, Mushroom Pictures	Roadshow Films, Dimension Films	1 hr 39 mins
Wolf Creek 2	Johnny Klimek	Toby Oliver	Sean Lahiff	Emu Creek Pictures, Duo Art Productions	Roadshow Films	1 hr 46 mins
Wolf Creek (television series)	Burkhard von Dallwitz and Michael Yezerski	Geoffrey Hall	Stephen Evans, Sean Lahiff, and Dave Redman	Emu Creek Pictures, Screentime, Stan. Original Series	Stan	9 hrs (45 mins/episodes)
Wolf Cre3k	TBA	TBA	TBA	Emu Creek Pictures	Cineverse, Bloody Disgusting	TBA

== Reception ==
=== Box office and financial performance ===
Film	Box office gross			Box office ranking		Total home video sales	Worldwide total gross income	Budget	Worldwide total net income	Ref.
Film	North America	Other territories	Worldwide	All-time North America	All-time worldwide	Total home video sales	Worldwide total gross income	Budget	Worldwide total net income	Ref.
Wolf Creek	$16,188,180	$14,706,616	$30,894,796	#4,421	#4,554	$9,566,552	$40,461,348	$1,100,000	$39,361,348	
Wolf Creek 2	—N/a	$4,383,978	$4,383,978	—N/a	#23,529	$375,072	$4,759,050	$1,700,000	$3,059,050	

=== Critical and public response ===
Film	Rotten Tomatoes	Metacritic	CinemaScore
Wolf Creek	55% (119 reviews)	56/100 (26 reviews)	F
Wolf Creek 2	51% (51 reviews)	44/100 (13 reviews)	—N/a

== Literature ==
Released in 2014, the franchise expanded with two prequel novels co-authored by Greg McLean and Aaron Sterns. Published by Penguin Global, the books explore the earlier events of the serial killer Mick Taylor's life. Through the separate stories, the character attempts to control his psychopathic impulses. Despite this, various life events including witnessing the horrific death of his younger sister, and experiences as a military recruit during the Vietnam War contribute to his descent into insanity. The series of books was met with positive critical reception.
