= List of Australian films of 2014 =

== 2014 ==
Title	Director	Cast (subject of documentary)	Genre	Notes	Release date
The Lego Movie	Phil Lord and Christopher Miller	Chris Pratt, Will Ferrell, Morgan Freeman, Elizabeth Banks	Comedy, Animation	Roadshow Films; British and American co-production	3 April
52 Tuesdays	Sophie Hyde	Tilda Cobham-Hervey, Del Herbert-Jane, Mario Späte, Beau Travis Williams	Drama	Vendetta Films	1 May
The Babadook	Jennifer Kent	Essie Davis, Noah Wieseman, Daniel Henshall, Barbara West, Benjamin Winspear	Horror	Umbrella Entertainment	22 May
Fat Pizza vs. Housos	Paul Fenech	Elle Dawe, Jabba, Tahir Bilgiç, Angry Anderson	Comedy	Transmission Films	27 November
Healing	Craig Monahan	Hugo Weaving, Robert Taylor, Xavier Samuel, Justin Clarke, Laura Brent	Drama	Screen Australia	8 May
I, Frankenstein	Stuart Beattie	Aaron Eckhart, Bill Nighy, Yvonne Strahovski, Miranda Otto, Socratis Otto, Jai Courtney, Kevin Grevioux	Action	Lions Gate Entertainment; Based on the novel of the same name by Kevin Grevioux	20 March
Kill Me Three Times	Kriv Stenders	Simon Pegg, Luke Hemsworth, Callan Mulvey	Action Thriller	Screen Australia	28 November
Maya the Bee	Alexs Stadermann	Coco Jack Gillies, Kodi Smit-McPhee, Joel Franco, Richard Roxburgh, Jacki Weaver, Miriam Margolyes	Family, Adventure	Based on Maya the Bee by Waldemar Bonsels	1 November
The Mule	Angus Sampson	Hugo Weaving, Angus Sampson, Leigh Whannell, Ewen Leslie	Drama	XLrator Media	21 November
My Mistress	Stephen Lance	Emmanuelle Beart, Harrison Gilbertson, Rachel Blake, Socratis Otto	Drama	Transmission Films	6 November
Predestination	Spierig brothers	Ethan Hawke, Sarah Snook, Noah Taylor	Thriller	Screen Australia; Based on the short story All You Zombies by Robert A. Heinlein	28 August
The Rover	David Michôd	Guy Pearce, Robert Pattinson, Scoot McNairy, Gillian Jones	Drama	Village Roadshow	12 June
Son of a Gun	Julius Avery	Ewan McGregor, Brenton Thwaites, Alicia Vikander	Thriller	Hopscotch Films	16 October
The Water Diviner	Russell Crowe	Russell Crowe, Jai Courtney, Jacqueline McKenzie	Drama	Entertainment One	26 December
Wolf Creek 2	Greg McLean	John Jarratt, Ryan Corr, Shane Connor, Shannon Ashlyn	Horror	Roadshow Entertainment; Sequel to Wolf Creek (2005)	20 February

== See also ==
- 2014 in Australia
- 2014 in Australian television
- List of 2014 box office number-one films in Australia
