= Wolfe Creek Meteorite Crater National Park =

National park in Western Australia

Wolfe Creek Crater National Park
- IUCN category III (natural monument or feature)
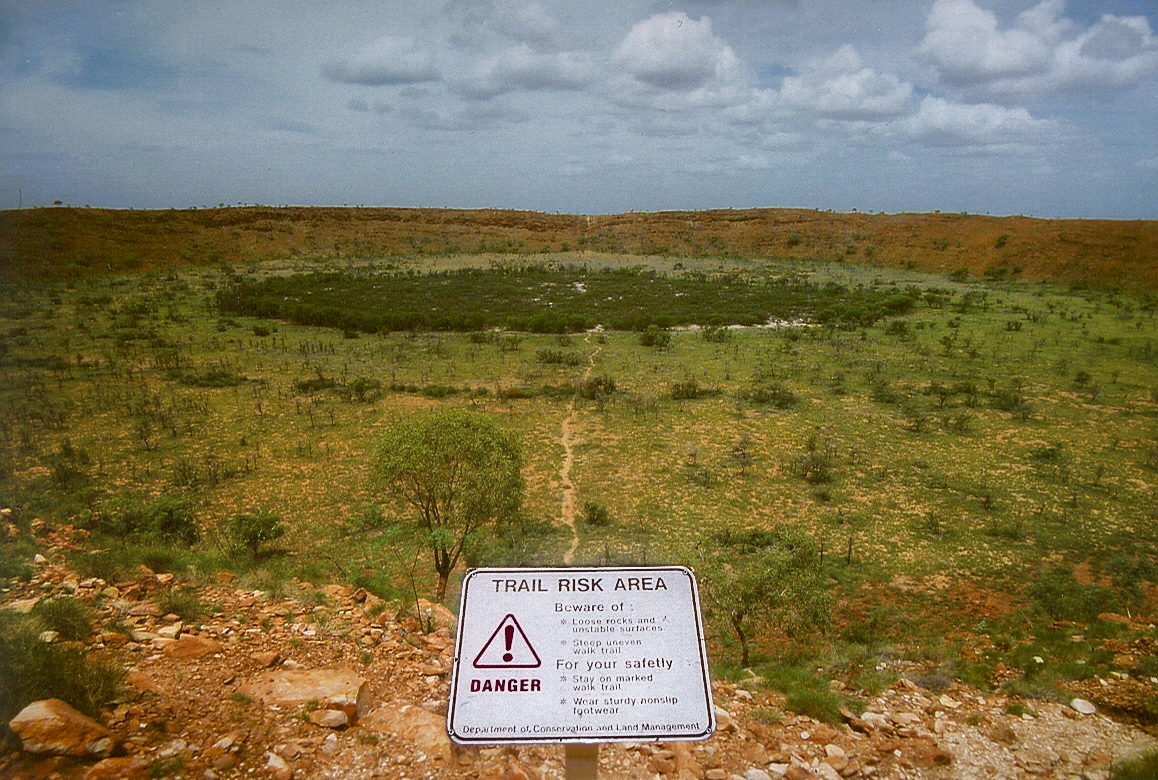
- Wolfe Creek Meteor Crater

- Location within Western Australia
- Location: Western Australia
- Nearest city: Halls Creek
- Coordinates: 19°10′25″S 127°47′40″E
- Area: 14.6 km^{2} (5.6 sq mi)
- Established: 1969
- Governing body: Department of Environment and Conservation
- Website: Official website

Wolfe Creek Crater National Park is a national park in Western Australia, 1,854 kilometres (1,152 mi) northeast of Perth. It contains Wolfe Creek Crater.

The park lies about 145 kilometres (90 mi) South from Halls Creek and can be accessed via the Tanami Road. The park is located on the edge of the Great Sandy Desert and is composed mostly of desert plains and spinifex grassland.

== See also ==
- Protected areas of Western Australia
