= List of 2014 box office number-one films in Australia =

This is a list of films which have placed number one at the box office in Australia during 2014. All amounts are in Australian dollars. The list below contains 53 weeks due to the first film gross tracking week of the year ending on 1 January, and the last week ending on 31 December.

== Number-one films ==
| † | This implies the highest-grossing movie of the year. |

| # | Week ending | Film | Total week gross | Openings |
|---|---|---|---|---|
| 1 | 1 January 2014 | The Hobbit: The Desolation of Smaug | $19,597,911 | Frozen (#2), The Secret Life of Walter Mitty (#4), Philomena (#5), The Railway Man (#7), August: Osage County (#11) |
| 2 | 8 January 2014 | The Hobbit: The Desolation of Smaug | $8,907,305 | Walking with Dinosaurs (#5) |
| 3 | 15 January 2014 | Frozen | $5,546,026 | The Book Thief (#3), Saving Mr. Banks (#4), Free Birds (#6), Veeram (#16), Lan Kwai Fong 3 (#19) |
| 4 | 22 January 2014 | Frozen | $4,440,897 | Jack Ryan: Shadow Recruit (#2), 47 Ronin (#6), Her (#16), Inside Llewyn Davis (#18) |
| 5 | 29 January 2014 | The Wolf of Wall Street | $7,996,599 | Paranormal Activity: The Marked Ones (#4), Jai Ho (#17) |
| 6 | 5 February 2014 | The Wolf of Wall Street | $4,969,855 | 12 Years a Slave (#2), Grudge Match (#12), The Monkey King (#16) |
| 7 | 12 February 2014 | The Wolf of Wall Street | $2,946,895 | RoboCop (#2), Last Vegas (#3), Mandela: Long Walk to Freedom (#6), Labor Day (#9) |
| 8 | 19 February 2014 | The Wolf of Wall Street | $2,506,086 | Endless Love (#4), Are We Officially Dating? (#5), Winter's Tale (#7), Dallas Buyers Club (#9), Gunday (#18) |
| 9 | 26 February 2014 | Wolf Creek 2 | $2,203,477 | Lone Survivor (#2), Le Week-End (#11), Nebraska (#15), National Theatre Live: Coriolanus (#19) |
| 10 | 5 March 2014 | Non-Stop | $2,409,608 | 3 Days to Kill (#7), Shaadi Ke Side Effects (#14), The Wind Rises (#18) |
| 11 | 12 March 2014 | 300: Rise of an Empire | $4,342,386 | Vampire Academy (#3), Tracks (#5), National Theatre Live: War Horse (#16), Starting Over Again (#17) |
| 12 | 19 March 2014 | The Monuments Men | $3,142,720 | Need for Speed (#3), The Armstrong Lie (#18), Generation Iron (#20) |
| 13 | 26 March 2014 | The Monuments Men | $2,333,539 | Ride Along (#4), Pompeii (#5), Cuban Fury (#7), I, Frankenstein (#13), Wadjda (#14), Met Opera: Prince Igor (#16) |
| 14 | 2 April 2014 | Noah | $5,948,958 | Mr. Peabody & Sherman (#2), The Raid 2: Berandal (#17), Recep İvedik 4 (#18), Nymphomaniac (#20) |
| 15 | 9 April 2014 | The Lego Movie | $8,796,370 | Captain America: The Winter Soldier (#2), Main Tera Hero (#19) |
| 16 | 16 April 2014 | The Lego Movie | $9,394,397 | Divergent (#3), The Grand Budapest Hotel (#5), Muppets Most Wanted (#7), Disco Singh (#10), Met Opera: Werther (#11) |
| 17 | 23 April 2014 | The Amazing Spider-Man 2 | $8,008,928 | The Other Woman (#2), 2 States (#10), The Invisible Woman (#11), That Demon Within (#13), Chinese Puzzle (#14), Only Lovers Left Alive (#15), Like Father, Like Son (#16), The Finishers (#19) |
| 18 | 30 April 2014 | The Other Woman | $5,544,957 | Transcendence (#5), 3D Naked Ambition (#12), Jatt James Bond (#13) |
| 19 | 7 May 2014 | The Other Woman | $3,082,573 | Fading Gigolo (#10), Met Opera: La bohème (#16), Iceman (#19) |
| 20 | 14 May 2014 | Bad Neighbours | $6,165,465 | Chef (#4), Belle (#6), Healing (#12), A Castle in Italy (#17), Aberdeen (#19) |
| 21 | 21 May 2014 | Godzilla | $8,428,163 | The Broken Circle Breakdown (#17), Child's Pose (#20) |
| 22 | 28 May 2014 | X-Men: Days of Future Past | $10,474,788 | Sunshine on Leith (#9), Son of God (#11), The Babadook (#17) |
| 23 | 4 June 2014 | X-Men: Days of Future Past | $5,643,085 | Maleficent (#2), A Million Ways to Die in the West (#3), The Trip to Italy (#6), Overheard 3 (#13), Met Opera: Così fan tutte (#14), Moms' Night Out (#17), Under the Skin (#19) |
| 24 | 11 June 2014 | The Fault in Our Stars | $5,431,152 | Edge of Tomorrow (#2), Grace of Monaco (#7), Holiday: A Soldier Is Never Off Duty (#12) |
| 25 | 18 June 2014 | The Fault in Our Stars | $3,037,129 | Blended (#5), The Rover (#12), Met Opera: La Cenerentola (#16), Maybe This Time (#18) |
| 26 | 25 June 2014 | 22 Jump Street | $8,950,191 | How to Train Your Dragon 2 (#2), The Two Faces of January (#10), National Theatre Live: King Lear (#16), Humshakals (#18), Frank (#19) |
| 27 | 2 July 2014 | Transformers: Age of Extinction | $12,315,717 | Tinker Bell and the Pirate Fairy (#8), Punjab 1984 (#13), Yves Saint Laurent (#14), Ek Villain (#16) |
| 28 | 9 July 2014 | Transformers: Age of Extinction | $7,105,383 | Rio 2 (#3), Jersey Boys (#5), Dawn of the Planet of the Apes (#8), Calvary (#11), The Breakup Guru (#16), Belle et Sébastien (#20) |
| 29 | 16 July 2014 | Dawn of the Planet of the Apes | $8,198,073 | The Lunchbox (#12), Humpty Sharma Ki Dulhania (#15), National Theatre Live: A Small Family Business (#20) |
| 30 | 23 July 2014 | Dawn of the Planet of the Apes | $4,522,625 | Sex Tape (#2), Charlie's Country (#12), Words and Pictures (#15), Velaiyilla Pattathari (#20) |
| 31 | 30 July 2014 | Hercules | $4,516,165 | Mrs. Brown's Boys D'Movie (#2), Deliver Us from Evil (#5), André Rieu 2014 Maastricht Concert (#6), Kick (#11), Still Life (#15), Snowpiercer (#20) |
| 32 | 6 August 2014 | Lucy | $6,141,579 | A Most Wanted Man (#8), These Final Hours (#10), Monty Python Live (Mostly) (#14) |
| 33 | 13 August 2014 | Guardians of the Galaxy | $8,543,366 | And So It Goes (#5), Begin Again (#12) |
| 34 | 20 August 2014 | Guardians of the Galaxy | $5,353,563 | The Hundred-Foot Journey (#2), The Expendables 3 (#3), Singham Returns (#12), Anjaan (#16), Postman Pat: The Movie (#17), God's Not Dead (#19) |
| 35 | 27 August 2014 | The Inbetweeners 2 | $4,023,690 | Doctor Who: "Deep Breath" (#6), Freedom (#9), The Hundred-Year-Old Man Who Climbed Out the Window and Disappeared (#13), Deepsea Challenge 3D (#17), 20,000 Days on Earth (#18) |
| 36 | 3 September 2014 | Guardians of the Galaxy | $2,364,905 | If I Stay (#4), Magic in the Moonlight (#5), Predestination (#8), Felony (#9), Dragon Ball Z: Battle of Gods (#11), Double Di Trouble (#12), Legends of Oz: Dorothy's Return (#19) |
| 37 | 10 September 2014 | Into the Storm | $2,622,362 | Boyhood (#9), What We Do in the Shadows (#10), But Always (#14), Mary Kom (#16) |
| 38 | 17 September 2014 | Teenage Mutant Ninja Turtles | $5,484,321 | Step Up: All In (#3), The Giver (#4), Finding Fanny (#18) |
| 39 | 24 September 2014 | The Maze Runner | $5,662,962 | The Boxtrolls (#3), Planes: Fire & Rescue (#4), House of Magic (#9), Sin City: A Dame to Kill For (#11), Wish I Was Here (#17), Khoobsurat (#19) |
| 40 | 1 October 2014 | The Maze Runner | $5,033,240 | The Equalizer (#3), The Skeleton Twins (#17), The Little Death (#18), The Admiral: Roaring Currents (#19) |
| 41 | 8 October 2014 | Gone Girl | $7,052,002 | Dracula Untold (#2), Annabelle (#4), Bang Bang! (#12), Billy Elliot the Musical Live (#14), Breakup Buddies (#15), Haider (#18) |
| 42 | 15 October 2014 | Gone Girl | $5,605,748 | The Judge (#3), One Direction: Where We Are - The Concert Film (#9), The Tale of Studio Ghibli Showcase (#20) |
| 43 | 22 October 2014 | Gone Girl | $4,158,664 | A Walk Among the Tombstones (#2), Tammy (#3), Before I Go to Sleep (#8), Son of a Gun (#15), Force Majeure (#16) |
| 44 | 29 October 2014 | Fury | $3,522,366 | This Is Where I Leave You (#3), Happy New Year (#6), Whiplash (#12), National Theatre Live: Skylight (#13), Hector and the Search for Happiness (#17), Living Is Easy with Eyes Closed (#18) |
| 45 | 5 November 2014 | Fury | $2,609,656 | John Wick (#3), The Best of Me (#4), Pride (#5), Kill the Messenger (#14), Maya the Bee Movie (#18), Spandau Ballet: Soul Boys of the Western World (#20) |
| 46 | 12 November 2014 | Interstellar | $5,782,196 | Love, Rosie (#5), Chaar Sahibzaade (#9), The Vatican Museums 3D (#10), Two Days, One Night (#13) |
| 47 | 19 November 2014 | Interstellar | $5,044,257 | Let's Be Cops (#2), My Old Lady (#5), The Drop (#11), Don't Go Breaking My Heart 2 (#13), Baaz (#18), Kill Dil (#20) |
| 48 | 26 November 2014 | The Hunger Games: Mockingjay – Part 1 † | $11,888,205 | Met Opera: Le nozze di Figaro (#12), The Dark Horse (#14), Happy Ending (#17) |
| 49 | 3 December 2014 | The Hunger Games: Mockingjay – Part 1 † | $7,522,942 | Nightcrawler (#3), Fat Pizza vs. Housos (#8), Serena (#9), Men, Women & Children (#13), Women Who Flirt (#14), A Thousand Times Good Night (#19) |
| 50 | 10 December 2014 | The Hunger Games: Mockingjay – Part 1 † | $4,212,488 | Exodus: Gods and Kings (#2), Alexander and the Terrible, Horrible, No Good, Very Bad Day (#3), Met Opera: Carmen (#13), Action Jackson (#15), Human Capital (#17) |
| 51 | 17 December 2014 | Horrible Bosses 2 | $2,779,613 | Paddington (#3), Fleet of Time (#11), Lingaa (#12), Folies Bergère (#13), National Theatre Live: A Streetcar Named Desire (#15) |
| 52 | 24 December 2014 | Paddington | $2,433,540 | Annie (#2), PK (#7), Exhibition on Screen: Rembrandt (#16) |
| 53 | 31 December 2014 | The Hobbit: The Battle of the Five Armies | $17,646,158 | Big Hero 6 (#2), Night at the Museum: Secret of the Tomb (#3), The Water Diviner (#4), St. Vincent (#8), Mr. Turner (#13), Love on the Cloud (#20) |

== See also ==
- List of Australian films - Australian films by year
- 2014 in film
