= Open Slather =

- Genre: Sketch comedy
- Written by: See: writers
- Directed by: Natalie Bailey; Steven Saussey; Iain Pirret; Tom Salisbury
- Theme music composer: John Foreman (Note: "The Revolution Will Be Televised" by Smoove was used until episode 10. A new theme by John Foreman was used from episode 11 onwards.)
- Opening theme: "The Revolution Will Be Televised" by Smoove
- Ending theme: "The Revolution Will Be Televised" by Smoove
- Composer: Kit Warhurst
- Country of origin: Australia
- Original language: English
- No. of seasons: 1
- No. of episodes: 20

Production
- Executive producers: Laura Waters; Rick McKenna
- Producers: Paul Walton; Laura Waters; Rick McKenna
- Cinematography: László Baranyai
- Running time: 60 minutes
- Production companies: Rick McKenna Entertainment; Princess Pictures

Original release
- Network: The Comedy Channel
- Release: 24 May – 8 November 2015

Open Slather is an Australian sketch comedy television series which first aired on The Comedy Channel on Foxtel on 24 May 2015. The 20 episode series is executively produced by Laura Waters and Rick McKenna. After the first ten episodes aired, the series experienced a hiatus while new episodes were in production. Replacing new episodes were 30 minute 'best of' episodes titled Open Slather Reopened. The second block of ten episodes began airing on 6 September, and concluded on 8 November 2015.

On 31 December 2015, it was announced the show had been cancelled.

== Cast ==
- Holly Austin
- Hannah Bath
- Shane Jacobson
- Jay K. Cagatay
- Dave Eastgate
- Gina Riley
- Stephen Curry
- Ben Gerrard
- Laura Hughes
- Demi Lardner
- Magda Szubanski
- Ben Lomas
- Marg Downey
- Miles O'Neil
- Glenn Robbins
- Ilai Swindells
- Jane Turner (11 episodes) (Note: Jane Turner appeared as a special guest in "Episode 14", "Episode 15", "Episode 16" and "Episode 17".)
- Emily Taheny
- Michael Veitch
- George H. Xanthis

=== Guest ===
- Franklyn Ajaye (1 episode)

=== Special guests ===
- Mark Holden as himself (1 episode)
- Hamish Blake as God (3 episodes)
- Dave Lawson (9 episodes)
- Gerry Connolly as Queen Elizabeth II (1 episode)
- Sting as himself (1 episode)
- Paul Hogan as Cardinal (1 episode)
- Peter Rowsthorn (5 episodes)
- Amy Schumer (1 episode)
- Bill Hader (1 episode)
- John Flaus (3 episodes)
- Jane Hall (1 episode)
- Colin Lane (1 episode)
- Eddie Perfect (3 episodes)
- John Wood (2 episodes)
- Ronda Rousey (1 episode)
- Nick Bracks (1 episode)
- Geoff Morrell (3 episodes)
- Christie Whelan Browne (1 episode)

=== Parodied characters ===
- Hannah Bath — Mary, Crown Princess of Denmark, Kirstie Allsop
- Jay K. Cagatay — Tony Abbott, Ed Sheeran, Jon Snow, Johnny Depp, Redfoo, Calum Hood, Harry Styles, Jesus, Russell Brand, Julian Assange, Hamburglar, Steve Baxter, Pete Evans, Jonathan Ive
- Marg Downey — Helen Clark
- Ben Gerrard — Donatella Versace
- Gina Riley — Liz Hayes, Gina Rileyano, Anna Wintour, Hillary Clinton
- Magda Szubanski — Angela Merkel, Gina Rinehart
- Jane Turner - Julie Bishop, Grant Denyer
- George H. Xanthis — Don Draper

== Writers ==
- Holly Austin (episodes 5, 9, 11, 15, 20)
- Hannah Bath (episodes 3, 8, 10, 17, 19, 20)
- Jay K. Cagatay (episodes 2, 5, 7, 9, 11)
- Paul Calleja
- John Campbell (episodes 1, 3–14, 17–20)
- Bryan Cockerill (episode 18)
- Mark Conway (episode 3)
- Lucas Crandles (episodes 13–17, 19)
- Stephen Curry (episodes 1–8, 10–18)
- Des Dowling (episode 7)
- Marg Downey (episodes 7, 10–13, 15, 16, 19, 20)
- Dave Eastgate (episodes 17, 18)
- Ben Gerrard (episodes 4, 8, 17, 18, 20)
- Happy Hammond (episodes 1–8)
- Jess Harris (episodes 10–13, 15, 17, 18, 20)
- Tegan Higginbotham (episodes 2–11, 17–20)
- Angus Hodge (episode 13)
- Laura Hughes (episode 3, 8, 9, 11, 15, 19, 20)
- Rhett Hughes (episodes 3–8, 11–14, 16–20)
- Shane Jacobson (episodes 1–3, 6–8, 10–12, 16)
- Dan Knight (episode 8)
- Demi Lardner (episodes 4, 5, 11, 13, 18)
- Dave Lawson (episodes 3, 4, 10, 11, 13–18)
- Ben Lomas (episodes 4–6, 8, 9, 14, 15)
- Brendan Luno (episodes 1–14, 17)
- Doug MacLeod (episodes 2–7)
- Shannon Marinko (episode 6, 9, 10)
- Cameron Marshall (episodes 2, 6, 9, 12, 14–20)
- Ray Matsen (episode 8)
- Zoe McDonald (episodes 8, 9, 11, 14, 18)
- Maggie McKenna (episodes 1, 2, 4, 11)
- Lauren Merolli (episodes 11–13, 16)
- Steve Mitchell (episodes 5, 13)
- Tony Moclair (episodes 1–7, 11, 13, 15, 18)
- Nick Musgrove
- Timothy Nash (episodes 13–17, 19)
- Dave O'Neil (episodes 1–8, 10–17, 19, 20)
- Miles O'Neil (episodes 6–9, 12, 13)
- Mark O'Toole (episodes 1–14, 18)
- Nick Place (episodes 7, 12, 15)
- Anita Punton (episodes 1–18)
- Amanda Reedy (episodes 4, 8, 14, 18–20)
- Gina Riley (episodes 1–8, 10–12, 14–18)
- Glenn Robbins (episodes 1, 2, 4–9, 11, 12, 14–17, 19, 20)
- Peter Rowsthorn (episode 10)
- Adam Rozenbachs (episodes 1–15, 17, 18, 20)
- Joel Slack-Smith (episode 14)
- Ilai Swindells (episodes 7, 11, 15, 19)
- Magda Szubanski (episodes 1, 7, 11–13, 20)
- Emily Taheny (episodes 7, 10, 11, 15)
- Richard Thorp (episodes 17, 18)
- Nathan Valvo (episode 19)
- Lory Vecchio (episodes 3, 15, 20)
- Michael Veitch (episodes 4, 5, 15)
- Paul Verhoeven (episodes 2, 6)
- Eric Walsh (episode 8)
- Michael Ward (episodes 3, 6–9, 11–15)
- Tom Ward (episode 18, 19)
- Nick Weller (episodes 4, 5, 7)
- George H. Xanthis (episodes 3, 7, 9, 19, 20)

=== Head writers ===
- Nick Weller (episodes 1–6)
- Phil Van Bruchem (episodes 1–6)

== Episodes ==
No.	Title	Directed by	Original release date	Viewers
1	"Episode 1"	Natalie Bailey and Steven Saussey	24 May 2015	243,000
We are introduced to Gina Minehart and her view on mining, a MasterChef contestant explodes after a misunderstanding in TV ethics, a new employee's email address is found to be too inappropriate and 60 Minutes reports on asylum seekers.
2	"Episode 2"	Natalie Bailey and Steven Saussey	31 May 2015	131,000
3	"Episode 3"	Natalie Bailey and Steven Saussey	7 June 2015	123,000
4	"Episode 4"	Natalie Bailey and Steven Saussey	14 June 2015	100,000
5	"Episode 5"	Natalie Bailey and Steven Saussey	21 June 2015	79,000
6	"Episode 6"	Natalie Bailey and Steven Saussey	28 June 2015	79,000
7	"Episode 7"	Natalie Bailey, Steven Saussey and Iain Pirret	5 July 2015	67,000
8	"Episode 8"	Natalie Bailey, Steven Saussey and Iain Pirret	12 July 2015	56,000
9	"Episode 9"	Natalie Bailey and Tom Salisbury	19 July 2015	N/A
10	"Episode 10"	Natalie Bailey and Tom Salisbury	26 July 2015	60,000
Hipsters face a crisis, a laundromat owner and an employee disturb their customers and a wife is upset over her husband's illicit photos.
11	"Episode 11"	Natalie Bailey and Tom Salisbury	6 September 2015	N/A
12	"Episode 12"	Natalie Bailey and Tom Salisbury	13 September 2015	N/A
13	"Episode 13"	Natalie Bailey and Tom Salisbury	20 September 2015	N/A
14	"Episode 14"	Natalie Bailey, Iain Pirret and Tom Salisbury	27 September 2015	N/A
Liz Hayes interviews "One Direction", a gimp drives Uber and Hillary Clinton debates Donald Trump
15	"Episode 15"	Natalie Bailey, Iain Pirret and Tom Salisbury	4 October 2015	N/A
16	"Episode 16"	Natalie Bailey, Iain Pirret and Tom Salisbury	11 October 2015	N/A
17	"Episode 17"	Natalie Bailey, Iain Pirret and Tom Salisbury	18 October 2015	N/A
18	"Episode 18"	Natalie Bailey, Iain Pirret and Tom Salisbury	25 October 2015	N/A
19	"Episode 19"	Natalie Bailey, Iain Pirret and Tom Salisbury	1 November 2015	N/A
20	"Episode 20"	Natalie Bailey, Iain Pirret and Tom Salisbury	8 November 2015	N/A

== Reception ==
Ben Nuetze of Crikey wrote "Open Slather is an apt title for Foxtel's brand new sprawling sketch show...In fact, I don't think I've ever seen a sketch show which is so eclectic and disconnected in terms of style. In moments it wears its politics on its sleeve; in others it sets about satirising Australian society, and it often picks up on the classic parody style of Fast Forward. There's really no singular idea holding all of this together, and the show seems to have no real focus and no clear reason for being...And yet, it's often surprisingly excellent."

David Knox of TV Tonight commented "On the positive side, there were some great laughs to be found in Open Slather....A strong cast of emerging comedians....slipped in with ease alongside Fast Forward veterans in this mix of popular culture, social and political humour. On the less-positive side some of the sketches struggled.....whilst others made me uneasy that they were trying to recapture Fast Forward's magic with a tone stuck in the 80s."
