= David Quirk =

Australian comedian

- Born: Australia

Comedy career
- Years active: 2002–present

David Quirk is an actor and stand-up comedian based in Melbourne, Australia.

== Early life and education ==
David Quirk grew up in Porepunkah, Victoria

== Career ==
=== Live ===
Quirk has been performing stand-up comedy since 2002. In 2006, he was a state finalist in Triple J's Raw Comedy competition, and in 2007 he made his Melbourne International Comedy Festival debut. He appears regularly on the comedy circuit in Australia and has performed internationally, including at the Edinburgh Festival Fringe.

=== Film and TV ===
Quirk has also appeared on television. In 2012 he appeared in the comedy series Problems, on ABC1, and in 2015 he was a guest on Please Like Me. In 2017 he played the role of Damien in the ABC comedy Rosehaven. More recently, Quirk has had roles on shows including Playing Gracie Darling, Surviving Summer, and Bad Company.

In 2020, he played the main role in Matt Vesely's short film System Error, produced by Sophie Hyde of Closer Productions. After starring in the 2020 short A Comedian, Quirk reteamed with writer/director James Robert Woods as a lead of the feature film The Birthday Trip, which is scheduled to be released in Australian cinemas on 17 July 2026.

== Awards ==
- 2010: Golden Gibbo (with Sam Simmons), MICF
- 2013: Piece of Wood Award (Comedians' choice), Melbourne International Comedy Festival (MICF)
- 2021: Nominated, Most Outstanding Show, MICF, for Astonishing Obscurity

== Personal life ==
Throughout his adult life, Quirk has worked in skateboard retail and rides a skateboard, both of which have featured prominently in his comedy material.

He is a vegan.
