= Wolfe Creek Crater =

Meteorite impact crater in Western Australia

- Kandimalal
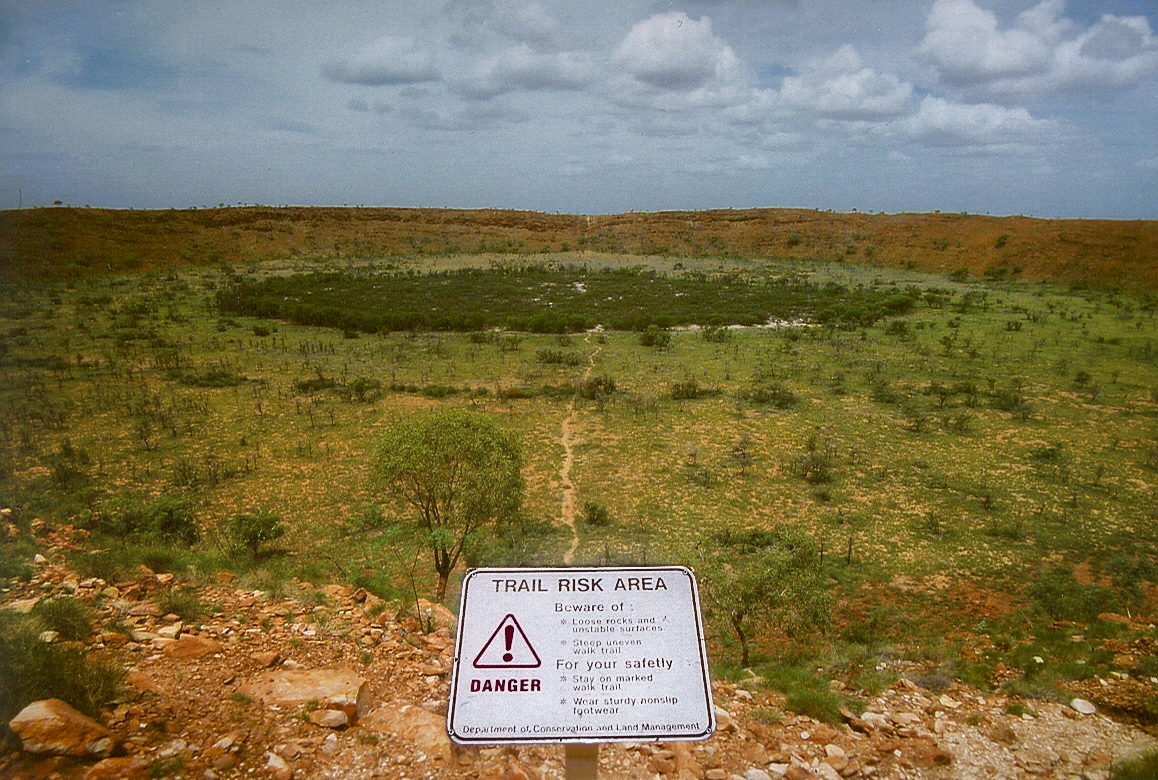
- The Wolfe Creek Meteorite Crater in 2003

- Location within Western Australia
- Location: Wolfe Creek Meteorite Crater National Park, Great Sandy Desert, Western Australia, Australia; 19°10′18″S 127°47′44″E

Impact crater structure
- Confidence: Confirmed
- Diameter: 875 m (2,871 ft)
- Depth: 60 m (200 ft)
- Age: ~150 ka Pleistocene
- Exposed: Yes
- Drilled: No
- Bolide type: iron meteorite ~50,000 t (49,000 long tons; 55,000 short tons)
- Access: Tanami Road

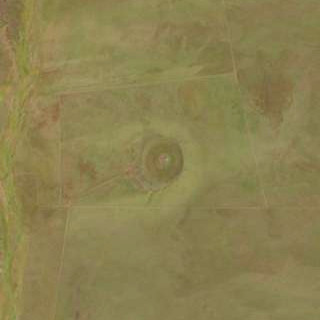
Wolfe Creek Crater. Sentinel-2 image.

Wolfe Creek Crater is a well-preserved meteorite impact crater (astrobleme) in Western Australia.

== Description ==
It is accessed via the Tanami Road 150 km (93 mi) south of the town of Halls Creek. The crater is central to the Wolfe Creek Meteorite Crater National Park.

The crater averages about 875 metres (2,871 ft) in diameter, 60 metres (200 ft) from rim to present crater floor. It is estimated that the meteorite that formed it was about 15 metres (49 ft) in diameter and had a mass of about 14,000 tonnes. For many years it was thought to have been created around 300,000 years ago, but in 2019, following investigations by researchers from Portsmouth University together with Australian and US researchers, it is now estimated to be less than 120,000 years old, placing the event in the Late Pleistocene. Small numbers of iron meteorites have been found in the vicinity of the crater, as well as larger so-called 'shale-balls', rounded objects consisting of iron oxide, some weighing as much as 250 kilograms (550 lb).

It was brought to the attention of scientists after being spotted during an aerial survey in 1947, investigated on the ground two months later, and reported in publication in 1949. The European name for the crater comes from a nearby creek, which was in turn named after Robert Wolfe (early reports misspell the name as Wolf Creek), a prospector and storekeeper during the gold rush that established the town of Halls Creek.

== Aboriginal significance ==
The local Djaru (Jaru) Aboriginal people refer to the crater as Kandimalal. There are multiple Dreaming stories about the formation of the crater. One such story describes the crater's round shape being formed by the passage of a rainbow snake out of the earth, while another snake formed the nearby Sturt Creek. Another story, as told by an Elder, is that one day the crescent moon and the evening star passed very close to each other. The evening star became so hot that it fell to the ground, causing an enormous explosion and flash, followed by a dust cloud. This frightened the people and a long time passed before they ventured near the crater to see what had happened. When they finally went there, they realised that this was the site where the evening star had fallen to the Earth. The Djaru people named the place "Kandimalal" and it is prominent in art from the region.

== Cultural references ==
The crater was featured in the 2005 Australian horror film Wolf Creek, and the sequel in 2013, Wolf Creek 2. It also features in the Stan Australia streaming service original television series with the same name.

It was the setting for Arthur Upfield's 1962 novel The Will of the Tribe.

The Wolfe Creek crater has considerable claim to be the second most 'obvious' (i.e. relatively undeformed by erosion) meteorite crater known on Earth, after the famous Barringer Crater in Arizona.

The crater is mentioned in the 2010 children's science fiction book Alienology that says (in its universe) that a space craft crashed there.
