= Wolf Creek (film) =

2005 Australian horror film by Greg McLean

- Theatrical release poster
- Directed by: Greg McLean
- Written by: Greg McLean
- Produced by: David Lightfoot; Greg McLean
- Starring: John Jarratt; Nathan Phillips; Cassandra Magrath; Kestie Morassi
- Cinematography: Will Gibson
- Edited by: Jason Ballantine
- Music by: François Tétaz
- Production companies: Film Finance Corporation: South Australian Film Corporation; 403 Productions; True Crime Channel; Mushroom Pictures
- Distributed by: Roadshow Films; Dimension Films
- Release dates: 24 January 2005 (Sundance); 3 November 2005 (Australia)
- Running time: 99 minutes
- Country: Australia
- Language: English
- Budget: AU$1.4 million
- Box office: AU$47.8 million (US$30.8 million)

Wolf Creek is a 2005 Australian horror film written, co-produced and directed by Greg McLean and starring John Jarratt, Nathan Phillips, Cassandra Magrath, and Kestie Morassi. Set in 1999, it follows three backpackers who find themselves taken captive and subsequently hunted by Mick Taylor, a serial killer, in the Australian outback. The film was ambiguously marketed as being "based on true events", and its plot bore elements reminiscent of the real-life murders of backpackers by Ivan Milat in the 1990s and Bradley Murdoch in 2001, both of whom McLean used as inspiration for the screenplay.

Produced on a budget of $1.1 million, Wolf Creek was shot in South Australia, almost exclusively on high-definition video. It had its world premiere at the Sundance Film Festival in January 2005. It was given a cinema release in Ireland and the United Kingdom in September 2005, followed by a general Australian release in November, apart from the Northern Territory, out of respect for the pending trial arising from the murder of Peter Falconio. In the United States and Canada, it was released on Christmas Day 2005, distributed by Dimension Films.

Wolf Creek received mixed reviews from film critics, with several, such as Roger Ebert and Manohla Dargis, criticising it for its unrelenting depictions of violence. (Note: Both Roger Ebert and Manohla Dargis in their reviews of the film criticised the film's presentation of violence, with Ebert writing that he wanted to walk out of the cinema.) Other publications, such as Variety and Time Out, praised the film's exploitation film aesthetics, with the latter calling its straightforward depiction of crime and violence "taboo-breaking". The film was nominated for seven Australian Film Institute awards, including Best Director (for McLean). In 2010, it was included in Slant Magazine's list of the 100 best films of the decade. The movie successfully launched a titular franchise including a sequel (2013), a television series continuation which ran from 2016 to 2017, and a legacy sequel in pre-production and scheduled to release in 2026.

== Plot ==
In 1999, two British tourists, Liz Hunter and Kristy Earl, are backpacking across Australia with Ben Mitchell, an Australian friend. Ben buys a dilapidated car for their journey from Broome, Western Australia to Cairns, Queensland via the Great Northern Highway.

After buying fuel at a petrol station, the trio makes a stop at Wolf Creek National Park and camp at the Wolf Creek Crater. Upon coming back to their car, hours later, they discover that their watches have stopped and the car will not start. After dark, a man named Mick Taylor comes across them and offers to tow them to his camp to repair the car. The group goes with him to an abandoned mining site several hours south of Wolf Creek. Mick regales them with tall stories of his past while making a show of fixing their car. He then gives the group water which causes them to fall unconscious.

Liz awakens gagged and tied in a shed. She breaks free and hears Mick torturing Kristy in a garage; it is implied that Mick has sexually assaulted her, and he brags about having done the same for months to another woman whose mutilated cadaver is hanging in the shed. Liz sets the now-dismantled car on fire to distract him, and goes to help Kristy. When Mick returns, she shoots him with his rifle, the bullet hitting him in the neck. The women attempt to flee in Mick's ute. Mick stumbles out of the garage and shoots at them before giving chase. The women evade him by pushing the ute off a cliff before returning to the site to get another car. Liz leaves a sobbing Kristy outside, telling her to escape on foot if Liz does not return in five minutes.

Liz enters another garage and discovers Mick's large stock of cars and travellers' possessions, including video cameras. She watches the playback on one of them and is horrified to see Mick "helping" other travellers stranded at Wolf Creek. She picks up Ben's camera and notices Mick's ute in the footage that Ben shot at a gas station, realising he was following them long before they got to Wolf Creek Crater. She gets into a car but Mick appears in the backseat and stabs her with a bowie knife. Liz crawls out and Mick slices three of her fingers off, then severs her spinal cord, paralyzing her. He leaves to investigate Kristy's whereabouts.

By dawn, Kristy has reached a highway and is discovered by a passing motorist. He attempts to help her but is shot dead by Mick with a hunting rifle. Mick gives chase, prompting Kristy to take off in the dead man's car. Kristy sideswipes Mick's car into a ditch when he pulls up alongside and begins to get away, but Mick emerges and shoots out her back tyre, causing her in turn to crash into a ditch. She attempts to crawl away, but is shot dead. Mick bundles the bodies into the back of the dead motorist's car and torches it.

Ben, whose fate has been unknown until now, awakens nailed to a mock crucifix in a mine shaft, with another dead male and aggressive dogs in a cage. He extracts himself and enters the camp in early daylight. He escapes into the outback, but becomes dehydrated and passes out beside a dirt road. He is discovered by a Swedish couple who take him to Kalbarri, where he is airlifted to a hospital.

A series of title cards states that despite several police searches, no trace of Liz or Kristy has ever been found. Early investigations into the case were disorganised, hampered by confusion over the location of the crimes, a lack of physical evidence, and the alleged unreliability of the only witness. After four months in police custody, Ben was cleared of suspicion, and has moved to Southern Australia. The film ends with Mick walking into the sunset with his rifle.

== Cast ==
- John Jarratt as Mick Taylor
- Cassandra Magrath as Liz Hunter
- Kestie Morassi as Kristy Earl
- Nathan Phillips as Ben Mitchell
- Guy O'Donnell as Car Salesman
- Geoff Revell as Graham
- Andy McPhee as Bazza
- Aaron Sterns as Bazza's mate
- Michael Moody as Bazza's older mate
- Gordon Poole as Old man
- Guy Petersen and Jenny Starvall as Swedish backpackers
- Greg McLean as Policeman

== Production ==
=== Inspiration and screenplay ===
Writer-director Greg McLean wrote the screenplay for Wolf Creek in 1997. The original screenplay resembled a straightforward slasher film, and McLean was ultimately displeased with the final product. After seeing media on serial killer Ivan Milat, McLean was inspired to rewrite the screenplay. He later said in subsequent interviews that he crafted the character of Mick Taylor based on archetypal "famous Australian exports" such as Steve Irwin, combined with darker national figures, such as Milat, a sadistic killer who murdered seven people in New South Wales between 1989 and 1993. McLean’s revised script was significantly anchored in the character of Mick Taylor: "The movie was really about, 'What would it be like to be stuck in this incredibly isolated place with the most evil character you can possibly imagine, who is also distinctly Australian?'", McLean commented in 2006. Additionally, the July 2001 abduction of British tourist Peter Falconio and the assault of his girlfriend Joanne Lees by Bradley John Murdoch in the Northern Territory was cited as an influence The film contains several oblique references to these crimes, including the setting of Taylor's mining camp, which is called "Navithalim Mining Co.", named for the reverse spelling of "Mila[h]t Ivan".

=== Casting ===
John Jarratt was cast in the role of Mick Taylor after having a meeting with McLean; Jarratt would later recall being significantly impressed by the screenplay, and McLean knew "within ten minutes" of their meeting that he was the right actor for the role.

On casting the three protagonists, McLean sought naturalistic performers: "I first said at the casting: it doesn’t matter if they’ve done ten movies or none, they just have to perform in a way that’s completely unselfconscious, and be able to be confident enough on screen to not telegraph their performance, to be believable and be able to improvise. We eventually found three amazing people who had those qualities and we pretty much knew straight away that they were the right people." Cassandra Magrath was cast as Liz, as McLean felt she had a "relatable quality" that the character required. Nathan Phillips was cast in the role of Ben; McLean had known Phillips prior, as they had met while preparing to work on a project that ultimately fell through. Kestie Morassi was cast as Kristy after a different actress had to drop out of the film. Incidentally, Morassi was scheduled to take a personal backpacking trip abroad when she was offered the role.

=== Filming ===
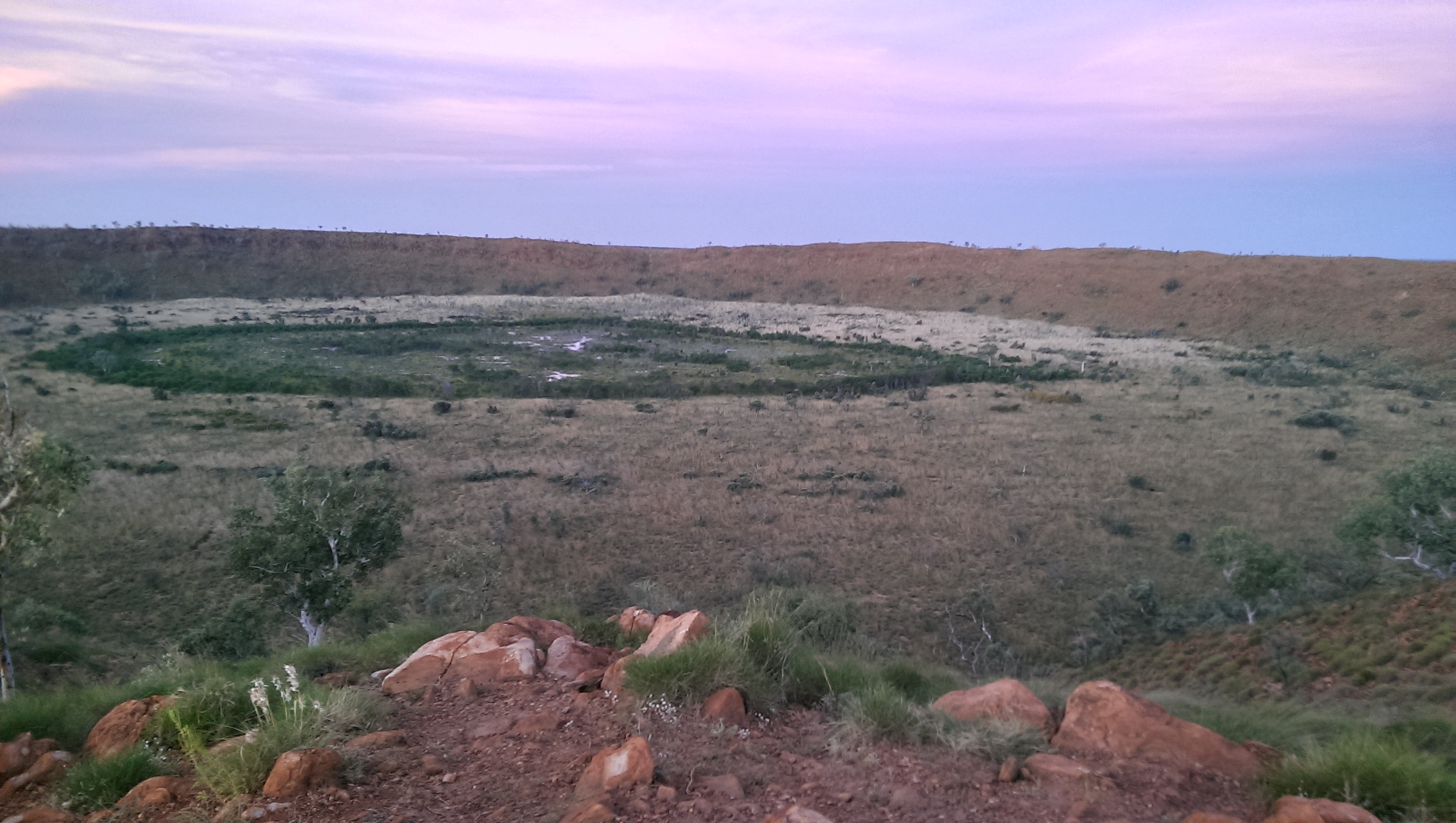
The Wolfe Creek Crater is featured prominently in the film

Wolf Creek was a considerably low-budget production, made for around A$1.4 million, with a minimal crew. Producer David Lightfoot stated that the filmmakers wanted to "mak[e] a 5 million dollar film on a 1 million dollar budget". The film was shot digitally on the HDCAM format and was mostly handheld (aside from a few static composite shots). Filming took place over approximately five weeks in Australia's winter months of 2004 almost entirely in South Australia. Principal photography began on May 24, 2004, and was completed in June 2004.

"My approach to the ugliness in Wolf Creek was the same way Mike Leigh would unflinchingly hold the camera on moments of incredibly intense human drama. I thought, what would it be like to do the same thing and hold the camera on someone who’s being tortured? What is it like to not look away? Part of the goal, for me anyway as a storyteller, is to not look away because what we do in our real life is not stare, it’s rude to look at a situation unfold. We tend to look away and go back into our own world."

— McLean on his stylistic approach

The film is set in a real location; however, the actual meteorite crater location is called "Wolfe Creek", and is located in northern Western Australia. The sequences in which the three main characters ascend the edge of crater were shot on a nondescript hillside in South Australia. Aerial shots of the crater, however, show the genuine Wolfe Creek crater. The beachfront scenes in the first fifteen minutes of the film were shot in Adelaide, standing in for Broome.

Several strange occurrences happened during the production. One particular location that was used during the shooting of the travellers' drive to Wolf Creek had not seen rainfall in over six years; however, once the crew arrived and shooting proceeded, it rained for three continuous days, forcing the writer, director and actors to incorporate the highly unexpected rainfall into the shooting script. According to McLean, the fact that it was raining and gloomy in an otherwise dry, sunny desert area gave the sequences a feel of "menace".

The rock quarry where Mick's mining site is located was the site of a real-life murder, which stirred up controversy from the local residents who mistook the film as being based on that crime. According to director McLean and others, Jarratt went to extremes in preparing for his role as Mick, in a bid to emulate, as close as possible, the real-life serial killer Ivan Milat: he spent significant time alone in the isolated outback and went for weeks without showering.

Since the film had a relatively low budget, many of the action scenes involved the real actors; for example, after running through the outback barefoot when her character escapes, star Kestie Morassi ended up with hundreds of thorns and nettles in her feet. During the shooting of Morassi's torture scene in the shed, her non-stop screams and crying began to discomfort and unsettle the crew; executive producer Matt Hearn said that the female members of the shooting crew were brought to tears by it, as if someone was actually being tortured.

=== Post-production ===
The original cut of Wolf Creek ran 104 minutes; however, 5 minutes of the film were excised in post-production. The surplus footage in this cut included an additional scene at the beginning of the film after the party sequence, in which Kristy awakens in bed next to Ben at a beach cottage the following morning; this created a romantic subplot between the characters, and was cut from the film for "complicating" matters unnecessarily.

The other additional footage took place when Liz returns to the mining site after leaving Kristy behind; rather than immediately entering the car garage, as she does in the theatrical cut, she finds a revolver and fills it with cartridges, and then explores an abandoned mine shaft in order to search for Ben. She subsequently drops her pistol into the shaft, and climbs down inside to find dozens of decomposing bodies. This explains why, in the theatrical cut, the revolver disappears after she enters the car garage. According to McLean, this scene was cut from the film after test screenings because it was "simply too much", along with all of the other gruesome events that had taken place prior. That being said, this scene is uncut as of 2023 on Netflix.

== Release ==
Wolf Creek premiered at the Sundance Film Festival in Park City, Utah, United States, on 24 January 2005. McLean and actors John Jarratt, Cassandra Magrath, Nathan Phillips, and Kestie Morassi were in attendance. Exactly one month prior to the film's Sundance premiere, Dimension Films acquired distribution rights to the film for North and Hispanic America, Spain, South Africa, Australia, New Zealand and the Benelux for US$3.5 million; its parent at the time, Miramax Films, subsequently bought all remaining international rights, giving it worldwide rights to the film. It was subsequently screened in Adelaide, Australia in March 2005, followed by screenings at the Melbourne International Film Festival and the Cannes Film Festival. In the United Kingdom, the film was given a limited release on 16 September 2005.

In Australia, the film opened on 151 cinemas on 3 November 2005, excluding the Northern Territory, out of respect for the pending trial for the murder of Peter Falconio, an event which had served as a partial inspiration for the screenplay. The trial for Falconio's accused killer, Bradley Murdoch, was still under way at the time, and for this reason the Northern Territory court placed an injunction on the film's release there in the belief that it could influence the outcome of the proceedings; Murdoch was eventually found guilty of murder on 13 December 2005.

In the United States, the film was released on Christmas Day 2005 by Dimension Films.

=== Marketing ===
Wolf Creek was marketed in both Australia and international markets as being "based on a true story", though it is in actuality a composite inspired by several true crimes (including the aforementioned killings by Milat and Murdoch).

=== Home media ===
In the United States and Canada, the film was released on DVD by Genius Products in April 2006, available in two versions: the standard 99-minute theatrical cut, and the 104-minute "unrated" cut, featuring additional scenes excised in post-production. An HD DVD was also released in North American markets on 19 December 2006. The film was released on Blu-ray in Australia by Roadshow Entertainment on 19 February 2014.

On 5 July 2023, Via Vision released a special edition two-disc Blu-ray in Australia featuring both the standard theatrical and unrated cuts of the film. It was released on Blu-ray and digitally in the United States by Lionsgate on 20 August 2024 with limited edition steelbook packaging, available exclusively at Walmart.

The German distributor Turbine Media issued the film in 4K UHD Blu-ray format on 12 December 2024, available in mediabook packaging with multiple cover art variants.

== Reception ==
=== Box office ===
Wolf Creek earned AU$1.2 million during its opening weekend in Australia, entering the Australian box office at number one. It would go on to gross a total of A$4,560,118 domestically.

In the United Kingdom, it was given a modest release on 16 September 2005 on 292 screens, and grossed £1,722,870. The film opened on 25 December 2005 in the United States on 1,749 screens, ranking number 9 at the U.S. box office during its opening weekend. It grossed a total $16,188,180 at the U.S. box office over the following three months. Box Office Mojo cites a worldwide gross of US$30,762,648 (A$47,651,407) as of 9 March 2006).

Release date (Australia)	Budget (AU$)	Box office revenue (AU$)					U.S. box office rankings	
Release date (Australia)	Budget (AU$)	Australia	United Kingdom	United States	Other markets	Worldwide total	Release year (2005)	All time
3 November 2005	$1,400,000	$6,244,350 (Note: According to Box Office Mojo, the film grossed US$4,560,118 in Australia. Currency conversion for 25 December 2005 (its closing Australian date) via OANDA makes for a total Australian gross of A$6,244,350.)	$1,722,870 (Note: According to Box Office Mojo, the film grossed US$3,040,179 in the United Kingdom, converted as of 2 October 2005 (its closing UK date) via OANDA to GBP$1,722,870.)	$22,060,400 (Note: According to Box Office Mojo, the film earned US$16,188,180 in the United States between 25 December 2005 and 9 March 2006. Currency conversion via OANDA for the date 9 March 2006 (the closing date of the film's U.S. theatrical run) makes for a A$22,060,400 U.S. gross.)	$5,164,880 (Note: With a worldwide box office gross of A$35,172,500, the difference after subtracting the A$ grosses of U.S. and UK box office data leaves a total of A$5,164,880 accounting for all other international markets.)	$35,172,500 (Note: According to Box Office Mojo, the film grossed US$27,762,600 worldwide. Currency conversion via OANDA for the date 9 March 2006 (the closing date of the film's U.S. theatrical run) makes for a A$38,026,200 worldwide gross.)	#129	#3,749
Note(s): All monetary data is accounted in AUD (see footnotes for conversion information).; U.S. box office rankings accurate as of April 2018.

=== Critical response ===
On Rotten Tomatoes, the film has an approval rating of 55%, based on 119 reviews, with an average rating of 5.8/10. The website's critical consensus states: "Though Wolf Creek is effectively horrific, it is still tasteless exploitation." The film also has a score of 56 out of 100 on Metacritic, based on 26 critics, indicating "mixed or average reviews". Audiences polled by CinemaScore gave the film a rare grade of "F" on a scale of A+ to F.

Upon the film's premiere at the Sundance Film Festival in January 2005, Dennis Harvey of Variety praised the film's "richly atmospheric" photography and McLean's direction, comparing it to The Texas Chain Saw Massacre, though noting: "Ending on a rather bleak note, and lacking the kind of false scares or other devices that normally give horror auds an occasional breather, [Wolf Creek] is scary cinema pushed to the brink of punishment. But there’s no question that what it sets out to do, it does alarmingly well."

Paul Byrnes of The Sydney Morning Herald praised Jarratt's performance in the film, ultimately deeming it "exceptional Aussie horror". The Age's Jim Schembri called the film "a cheaply made, highly derivative, blood-soaked splatter film in which a clutch of young people on holiday encounter a psychopath with a love for dismemberment and laughing out loud when he hurts someone", though noted: "What sets [it] apart is the skill with which McLean synthesizes his cinematic sampling into a seamless, deeply seductive narrative. He winks at his references but never takes his eye off his own story or his brilliant modulations of suspense and character tension". In the United Kingdom during its September 2005 theatrical run, The Independent praised the film for its departure from typical genre prototypes. The Guardian film critic Peter Bradshaw awarded it four out of five stars. Time Out wrote of the film: "by making us feel the pain, Greg McLean's ferocious, taboo-breaking film tells us so much more about how and why we watch horror movies".

Critical reviews in the United States varied: Several critics, such as the Chicago Sun-Times's Roger Ebert, lambasted the film's depiction of violence, and with some even walking out of screenings. Ebert awarded the film a zero out of four stars, writing: "It is a film with one clear purpose: To establish the commercial credentials of its director by showing his skill at depicting the brutal tracking, torture and mutilation of screaming young women. When the killer severs the spine of one of his victims and calls her 'a head on a stick,' I wanted to walk out of the theater [...] There is a role for violence in film, but what the hell is the purpose of this sadistic celebration of pain and cruelty? The theaters are crowded right now with wonderful, thrilling, funny, warm-hearted, dramatic, artistic, inspiring, entertaining movies. If anyone you know says this is the one they want to see, my advice is: Don't know that person no more." Similarly, The Seattle Times film critic Moira Macdonald wrote that Wolf Creek was the first film she ever walked out of; she called watching the film "punishment" and wondered how someone's real death inspired this "entertainment". Manohla Dargis of The New York Times noted: "Mr. McLean has apparently watched his share of Val Lewton, the legendary B-movie producer... who could raise shivers just by dimming the lights. Alas, Mr. McLean's commitment to contemporary genre expectations turns out to be unwavering and what follows these imaginative night tremors is just the usual butchery".

Michael Atkinson of The Village Voice wrote of the film: "The ambitions are so paltry that our response should be too: Wolf Creek is unimaginative, light on the grue and heavy on the faux-serious desperation. It's actually something of a Spanish Inquisition–level trial by overacting—the three leads are low-budget dull, but as the anti–Crocodile Dundee, Jarratt is a leering, jeering, winking, colloquialism-belching horror". G. Allen Johnson of the San Francisco Chronicle, however, praised the film's "naturalistic" style, writing: "What's Christmas Day without a good serial killer movie? There are no obnoxious teenagers in Wolf Creek, nor are there ghosts, possessed children, haunted web sites or supernaturally produced videotapes. There isn't even an Asian horror film upon which to base the screenplay. Instead, there is desolation, real terror and one hell of a villain in rural Australia in Greg McLean's energetically gritty bit of low-budget showmanship". Josh Bell of Las Vegas Weekly also gave the film a favorable review, describing it as "an unsettling minimalist film in the vein of early Wes Craven and Tobe Hooper, right down to its dubious claims of being based on a true story. Eschewing many tired conventions of recent Hollywood horror movies, McLean achieves his scares by actually depicting scary events, rather than just turning up the music or having people jump out from behind closed doors."

The film magazines Empire and Total Film gave the film 4/5 stars, with Empire calling it "a grimy gut-chiller that unsettles as much as it thrills, violently shunting you to the edge of your seat before clamping onto your memory like a rusty mantrap".

=== Accolades ===
Award/association	Year	Category	Subject	Result	Ref.
Australian Film Institute Awards	2005	Best Direction	Greg McLean	Nominated	
Australian Film Institute Awards	2005	Best Original Screenplay	Greg McLean	Nominated	
Australian Film Institute Awards	2005	Best Editing	Jason Ballantine	Nominated	
Australian Film Institute Awards	2005	Best Cinematography	Will Gibson	Nominated	
Australian Film Institute Awards	2005	Best Actress in a Supporting Role	Kestie Morassi	Nominated	
Australian Film Institute Awards	2005	Best Original Music Score	François Tétaz	Nominated	
Australian Film Institute Awards	2005	Best Sound	Des Kenneally	Nominated	
Australian Film Institute Awards	2005	Best Sound	Peter Smith	Nominated	
Australian Film Institute Awards	2005	Best Sound	Pete Best	Nominated	
Australian Film Institute Awards	2005	Best Sound	Tom Heuzenroeder	Nominated	
Australian Cinematographers Society	2005	Will Gibson	Award of Distinction	Won	
Cannes Film Festival	2005	Greg McLean	Caméra d'Or	Nominated	
Cannes Film Festival	2005	Greg McLean	CICAE Award	Nominated	
Cannes Film Festival	2005	Greg McLean	SACD Prize	Nominated	
Empire Awards	2006	Best Horror Film	Wolf Creek	Nominated	
Fangoria Chainsaw Awards	2006	Best Actor	John Jarratt	Nominated	
Fantastic Fest	2005	Best Actor	John Jarratt	Won	
Film Critics Circle of Australia	2005	Best Editor	Jason Ballantine	Nominated	
Inside Film Awards	2005	Best Direction	Greg McLean	Nominated	
Inside Film Awards	2005	Best Cinematography	Will Gibson	Nominated	
Inside Film Awards	2005	Best Production Design	Robert Webb	Nominated	
Inside Film Awards	2005	Best Sound	Pete Best; Pete Smith; François Tétaz	Nominated	
Saturn Awards	2006	Best Horror Film	David Lightfoot	Nominated	
Saturn Awards	2006	Best Horror Film	Greg McLean	Nominated	
Sundance Film Festival	2005	Grand Jury Prize	Greg McLean	Nominated	

== Legacy ==
Wolf Creek has been cited as one of several films released in the mid-2000s that initiated a "substantial boom" of Australian horror films. Film critics David Edelstein and Bilge Ebiri placed the film at 25th on their list of "the 25 Best Horror Films Since The Shining". In a 2010 retrospective, Slant Magazine included the film in its list of the 100 best films of the past decade, and in 2018, Esquire listed it as 14th scariest film of all time.

The film has also received scholarly attention. In A Companion to the Horror Film (2017), film scholar Harry Benshoff cites Wolf Creek as a "distinguished" example of the "torture porn" subgenera, noting its "detailed character development... compelling performances... and sustained use of dread" as key features. Additionally, he praised the film's cinematography and sound design, which "mirrors the development of narrative intensity". Historian Elise Rosser discusses Wolf Creek as a notable example of rural outback horror, which subverts rural idealism to render the outback as a "place for monsters". Additionally, Rosser observes how McLean draws upon Australian cultural memories of violent and shocking crimes, inverting the Australian trope of the larrikin to "personify the monsters waiting in the outback".

== Sequels and spin-offs ==
After the success of the first film, McLean postponed plans to immediately work on a sequel in favor of directing Rogue. Production was initially expected to commence in 2011 and John Jarratt was announced to reprise his role of Mick Taylor. In August 2011 Geoffrey Edelsten was announced as a private investor for the movie and that he would be funding A$5 million into the production of Wolf Creek 2 after reading the script. Later that same year, Edelsten withdrew his funding, alleging that he had been misled by McLean and Emu Creek Pictures into believing that he would not be the largest single private investor, a claim the production company denied. Filming and production of Wolf Creek 2 was postponed until late 2012, when additional funding was made available through the South Australian Film Corporation. Filming took place in late 2012 and early 2013 in Australia, and the movie had its world premiere on 30 August 2013 at the Venice Film Festival. The film was given a wide release in Australia on 20 February 2014.

In 2016, the Wolf Creek web television series debuted on Stan. A second series aired in 2017 and it was confirmed a third film was still planned. In April 2022, after a series of delays, some linked to the COVID-19 pandemic, another film, Wolf Creek 3, was in the development phase, specifically, location scouting. It is set to be directed by Rachele Wiggins and written by Duncan Samarasinghe with Greg McLean as producer. In 2021, Altitude Film Distribution was scheduled to distribute in the United Kingdom, however this was abandoned. Jarratt will reprise his role as Taylor. The premise is "An American family takes a dream trip to the Australian outback and soon draws the attention of notorious serial killer Mick Taylor. A hellish nightmare ensues as the couple's two children escape only to be hunted by Australia's most infamous killer." In 2022, Wolf Creek 3 was set to be released, with the tagline "There Will be Blood". In August 2024, it was announced the franchise was scheduled to be relaunched, with a sequel titled Wolf Creek: Legacy in development, with Sean Lahiff serving as director. Principal photography was scheduled to begin in early 2025 with Jarratt reprising his leading villainous role.

By February 2025, it was announced that Cineverse and Bloody Disgusting would serve as distributing companies in North America, with a theatrical release scheduled for fall 2026.

== See also ==
- List of films featuring psychopaths and sociopaths

== Sources ==
- Aveyard, Karina; Moran, Albert; Vieth, Errol (2017). Historical Dictionary of Australian and New Zealand Cinema (2nd ed.). Lanham, Maryland: Rowman & Littlefield. ISBN 978-1-538-11127-7.
- Benshoff, Harry M. (2017). A Companion to the Horror Film. Chichester, West Sussex: Wiley Blackwell. ISBN 978-1-119-33501-6.
- Goldsmith, Ben; Lealand, Geoff (2010). Directory of World Cinema: Australia and New Zealand. Bristol, England: Intellect Ltd. p. 191. ISBN 978-1-841-50373-8.
- McLean, Greg; Hearn, Matt; Magrath, Cassandra; Morassi, Kestie (2006). Wolf Creek (DVD audio commentary). Genius Products. OCLC 67712561.
- Shelley, Peter (2012). Australian Horror Films, 1973-2010. Jefferson, North Carolina: McFarland & Company. ISBN 978-0-786-46167-7.
