= The Birthday Trip =

Australian film directed by James Robert Woods

The Birthday Trip is a 2026 Australian satirical dramedy film written, directed, shot and edited by James Robert Woods, and stars David Quirk, Luke Jacobz, Annelise Hall, Ben Gerrard, Sapphire Blossom, Nicola Frew, Robert Preston, and Josephine Starte.

Previously titled Moonrise Over Knights Hill, The Birthday Trip was released theatrically in Australia on July 30 2026.

== Cast ==
- David Quirk as Jim Conrad
- Luke Jacobz as Lars Jansen
- Annelise Hall as Isabel McDonald
- Ben Gerrard as Mark McDonald
- Sapphire Blossom as Sapphire Phoenix
- Nicola Frew as Clare Lapsley-Smith
- Robert Preston as Felix Doyle
- Josephine Starte as Angie Olsson

== Production ==
The Birthday Trip is the first feature film by production company Badlands, founded by The Birthday Trip's writer/director James Robert Woods and producer Stephanie Jane Day who met while studying at AFTRS in 2017, naming the company after Terrence Mallick's 1973 film. The film was shot chronologically over two weeks in Robertson, New South Wales, the same town that Babe was filmed, which is referenced in the film. With a short shooting schedule, Woods decided to shoot on smaller, handheld cameras to be versatile and lively while also getting up-close to the drama, which is a stylistic approach he uses regularly in his work. The Birthday Trip was funded independently rather than by government grants as Woods sought to have freedom while making the film.

== Release ==
The Birthday Trip is the first film distributed by Badlands, who released it in Australia on 30 July, 2026. Prior to this, The Birthday Trip played a series of special advance screenings across the country, including Thornbury Picture House in Melbourne and Sydney Cinématheque.

== Reception ==
Luke Buckmaster of The Guardian said, "The thrill comes from watching very different people pushed and pulled by social currents, power structures and conflicting temperaments. Nobody is necessarily 'right' or 'wrong' and nothing is necessarily settled. In this type of film-making, conversations matter – and the real spectacle is verbal."
