= Wolf Creek 2 =

2013 horror film

- Theatrical release poster
- Directed by: Greg McLean
- Written by: Greg McLean; Aaron Sterns
- Based on: Characters created by Greg McLean
- Produced by: Helen Leake; Greg McLean; Steve Topic
- Starring: John Jarratt; Ryan Corr; Philippe Klaus; Shannon Ashlyn
- Cinematography: Toby Oliver
- Edited by: Sean Lahiff
- Music by: Johnny Klimek
- Production companies: Duo Art Productions; Emu Creek Pictures
- Distributed by: Roadshow Films
- Release dates: 30 August 2013 (Venice); 20 February 2014 (Australia)
- Running time: 106 minutes
- Country: Australia
- Language: English
- Budget: $1.7 million
- Box office: $4.7 million

Wolf Creek 2 is a 2013 Australian horror film directed by Greg McLean, who co-wrote the script with Aaron Sterns. The film is a sequel to Wolf Creek (2005), and the second installment in the Wolf Creek franchise. It stars John Jarratt, reprising his role as Mick Taylor. It was released on 30 August 2013 at the Venice Film Festival, then released in Australia on 20 February 2014.

The film follows a young German couple, and a British tourist, who fall victim to the kidnapping and torture of Mick Taylor, a deranged xenophobic killer, while travelling in the Australian outback. Similar to the 2005 film, the plot is based upon the real-life murders of backpackers by Ivan Milat in the 1990s and Bradley John Murdoch in 2001. The film received mixed reviews from critics, praising the performances of Jarratt and Corr, but criticism for the violence and gore. The film grossed over $4.7 million at the Australian box office. A third film is currently in development.

== Plot ==
In North West Australia, highway patrol officers Gary Bulmer (Shane Connor) and Brian O'Connor (Ben Gerrard) are parked by an outback highway, desperate to meet a quota for speeding tickets. Mick Taylor (John Jarratt) drives past going under the speed limit and they pull him over, claiming he was speeding. After belittling and insulting Mick, the two officers give him a speeding ticket and an order to get rid of his truck. Soon after in retaliation, Mick shoots O'Connor in the head as the officers drive away, causing the car to crash in a gully. Despite Bulmer's desperate pleas, Mick breaks his leg, stabs him in the back with a Bowie knife paralysing his legs and places the mortally wounded officer back in the car before dousing it with petrol and setting it alight. Mick departs, leaving Bulmer to burn alive in the resulting explosion.

Meanwhile, a young German couple, Rutger and Katarina, hitchhike from Sydney to Wolf Creek Crater and camp nearby. In the middle of the night, Mick arrives at the campsite and offers them a lift to a caravan site so they do not get charged for camping in a national park. When Rutger declines his offer, Mick loses his temper and stabs Rutger in the back. He then ties Katarina up and prepares to rape her, but a wounded Rutger battles Mick; Rutger is eventually overpowered and decapitated. Mick then tells Katarina they'll be spending "a nice long few months together" before strangling her until she falls unconscious.

Katarina wakes up later in the night to see Mick cutting up Rutger's body to feed to his dogs. She flees into the bush and Mick pursues her in his truck, referring to this as playing a game of hide and seek. At the same time, English tourist Paul Hammersmith (Ryan Corr) is driving along the highway, and stops when he sees Katarina standing in the road. He picks her up, but Mick relentlessly pursues them. Mick shoots at Paul, but accidentally kills Katarina instead. Paul then drives off, remorsefully leaving Katarina's body in the sand and covering it with just a sleeping bag at daybreak.

Paul reaches a highway. Realising he has low fuel, he tries to flag down a truck in the distance. He soon realises that Mick is driving the truck, having killed the original driver. After a long chase, during which Mick runs over numerous kangaroos which are crossing the highway, Mick nudges Paul's vehicle at a steep hillside, sending it rolling down into a valley. Paul survives the crash and taunts Mick, who sends the truck hurtling down into Paul's vehicle, which explodes as Paul barely escapes the area. Paul treks across the outback for hours looking for help. Exhausted and dehydrated, he passes out near an outback homestead and is given food and shelter by an elderly couple. They plan to take Paul to the nearest town after he has eaten, but Mick finds the house, and shoots the couple dead. Paul flees again; Mick catches Paul hiding in the grassland and knocks him out.

Paul wakes up in Mick's dungeon, zip-tied to a chair. Mick is furious at Paul for his role in Katarina's death and prepares to torture him, but Paul pacifies him with his "English wit" by narrating limericks and leading Mick in drinking songs that he claims he learned at boarding school. He also gets Mick to join him in singing Rolf Harris's "Tie Me Kangaroo Down, Sport". Mick's torture for Paul consists of a ten-question quiz about Australian culture and history, with a promise to free him if he answers five of them correctly. However, for each question Paul answers incorrectly, he loses a finger. Paul answers the first two questions correctly and reveals that he is a history major. After he gets the next question 'wrong', Mick (irritated by Paul's knowledge) grinds off one of his fingers with a grinder.

The next question was with regard to cricket and who the greatest cricketer was (Donald Bradman), with Paul replying Douglas Jardine incorrectly. When Paul intentionally gets this answer wrong, Mick cuts his other hand free (at Paul's request) from the zip tie and grinds off a finger. Mick threatens to emasculate and rape Paul in Katarina's place; when Paul calls Mick a faggot, Mick is outraged and throttles him, giving Paul, hands still free, the opportunity to take a nearby hammer and attack Mick with it before fleeing into the tunnels of the dungeon. Paul finds numerous decayed corpses and a severely emaciated woman begging to be freed. While being pursued by an injured Mick, Paul eventually stumbles across an exit, but notices a sheet on the ground directly in front of it. Lifting it up, he finds a Punji stick trap underneath. As he considers trying to jump over it, he hears someone coming and hides, assuming it's Mick. When the figure approaches, he knocks them into the trap and kills them; it was the woman he encountered earlier. Immediately afterwards, Mick finds and subdues Paul, and headbutts him unconscious.

When he wakes up, Paul finds himself, dressed only in his underpants, on a footpath in a small town, with multiple wounds across his body. He finds a handwritten note near him which reads "LOSER" before being discovered by two police officers. A series of title cards before the credits reveal that despite reporting Mick to the police, Paul was held as a suspect in various unsolved murders in the Wolf Creek area. During the investigation, he suffered a complete mental breakdown and was deported back to the UK and placed in full-time care at Ashworth Hospital in Maghull, Merseyside. The film ends like the first film with Mick walking off into the outback with his rifle.

== Cast ==
- John Jarratt as Mick Taylor
- Ryan Corr as Paul Hammersmith
- Shannon Ashlyn as Katarina Schmidt
- Philippe Klaus as Rutger Enqvist
- Shane Connor as Senior Sergeant Gary Bulmer Jr
- Ben Gerrard as Constable Brian O'Connor
- Gerard Kennedy as Jack
- Annie Byron as Lil
- Sarah Roberts as English girl
- Jordan Cowan as Young Woman

== Production ==
Despite the first film's success, McLean chose to begin work on the film Rogue rather than develop a sequel. Later he said he regretted that decision: 'If I'd known then what I know now about how long it would take to get this up, I'd probably have said yes to a sequel earlier.' In 2010, McLean announced that he was developing a sequel and confirmed that Jarratt would be returning to portray Taylor. While developing the script, McLean chose to focus on Taylor as the character was "the most interesting thing about the first movie." McLean says that the second story, like the first, is based on true events, a point he said would be "pretty obvious when [viewers] see the film".

Geoffrey Edelsten signed on to invest in the production of Wolf Creek 2, but later withdrew his support of the film and alleged that McLean had misled him into believing that he would not be the largest single private investor. When the funding deadline had passed, Emu Creek Pictures sent Edelsten's Millennium Management a statutory demand for A$4.923 million. Edelsten asked the Supreme Court of Victoria to set aside the demand so he could seek further legal recourse. McLean and Emu Creek Pictures denied they had misled Edelsten, and said they had shown Edelsten documents that clearly set out his A$5 million share of the A$5.2 million support expected from private investors. The funding plan specified that any shortfall from that level would be made up by Screen Australia and the South Australian Film Corporation (SAFC).

Filming was set to begin in 2011, but the loss of Edelsten's backing delayed the production. McLean risked losing the funds from the government bodies if he could not find another private investor. Early in 2012 the SAFC withdrew its commitment but recommitted in September to the tune of A$400,000, enabling production to resume. Filming began in 2012 and continued into early 2013.

== Release ==
Wolf Creek 2 was released theatrically in Australia on 20 February 2014. The film also opened in the United States on 17 April 2014.

=== Home media ===
The film was released on DVD, digital and Blu-ray Disc in Australia on 25 June 2014 through Roadshow Entertainment. Two cuts of the film were released, a theatrical and director's cut. Special features include an audio commentary by writer/director/producer Greg McLean, a fifty-minute documentary titled Creating a Monster: The Making of Wolf Creek 2 and nine deleted scenes.

== Reception ==
=== Box office ===
The film grossed over $1,510,578 at the box office, making it the number one film in its opening weekend. The movie's total collection in Australia stood at $4,732,168.

=== Critical response ===
Initial response at the Venice Film Festival was mostly positive. The Hollywood Reporter summarized the story thus: 'A psychopathic serial killer and his knife carve out an edge-of-seat gorefest that follows safely in the tracks of its predecessor.' Variety's review commented that the film was "neither as striking nor as fundamentally scary as its predecessor" but was "still quite a ride, and one that genre-inclined distribs should have no qualms about hitching." Likewise, Norman Gator of The Sydney Morning Herald gave the film four out of four stars, calling it "Perhaps the greatest Aussie flick ever made. I hope to hell there'll be a third one."

The film has a rating of 52% on Rotten Tomatoes based on reviews from 52 critics, with an average rating of 5.70/10. The site's critical consensus states "After a strong start, Wolf Creek 2 devolves into an unnecessary – and disappointingly predictable – sequel." The film has a score of 44 out of 100 on Metacritic based on 13 critics indicating "Mixed or average reviews."

=== Accolades ===
Award	Category	Subject	Result
Australian Screen Sound Guild	Best Achievement in Mixing for a Feature Film	Paul Pirola	Won
Australian Screen Sound Guild	Best Achievement in Mixing for a Feature Film	Peter D. Smith	Won
Nocturna Madrid International; Fantastic Film Festival	Best Acting Award	Ryan Corr	Won
Nocturna Madrid International; Fantastic Film Festival	Best Acting Award	John Jarratt	Won
Nocturna Madrid International; Fantastic Film Festival	Best Directing Award	Greg McLean	Won
Nocturna Madrid International; Fantastic Film Festival	Best Script Award	Greg McLean	Won
Nocturna Madrid International; Fantastic Film Festival	Best Script Award	Aaron Sterns	Won
Saturn Awards	Best DVD or Blu-ray Release		Nominated

== Franchise ==
=== Television series ===
In 2016, the Wolf Creek web television series debuted on Stan. A second series aired in 2017 and it was confirmed a third film was still planned.

=== Sequel ===
In April 2022, after a series of delays, some linked to the COVID-19 pandemic, another film, Wolf Creek 3, was in the development phase, specifically, location scouting. It is set to be directed by Rachele Wiggins and written by Duncan Samarasinghe with Greg McLean as producer. In 2021, Altitude Film Distribution was scheduled to distribute in the United Kingdom, however this was abandoned. Jarratt will reprise his role as Taylor. The premise is "An American family takes a dream trip to the Australian outback and soon draws the attention of notorious serial killer Mick Taylor. A hellish nightmare ensues as the couple's two children escape only to be hunted by Australia's most infamous killer." In 2022, Wolf Creek 3 was set to be released, with the tagline "There Will be Blood". On 30 August 2024, it was announced a new reboot for the franchise will begin filming in early 2025 titled as Wolf Creek: Legacy with Jarratt set to return and reprise the role and Sean Lahiff as new director. In March 2026, filming began on the third feature film in South Australia.

On 19 November 2026, the title of the film was revealed to be Wolf Cre3k, and a theatrical release date of 19 March 2027 was set.
