= Laura Wheelwright =

Australian actress

- Born: 10 September 1990 (age 36)
- Education: Victorian College of the Arts (2009); 16th Street Acting Studio (2012); Howard Fine Acting Studio (2017)
- Occupation: Actress
- Known for: Animal Kingdom (2010)

Laura Wheelwright (born 10 September 1990) is an Australian actress best known for her role in the 2010 feature film Animal Kingdom.

== Early life and education ==
Wheelwright studied acting at Victorian College of the Arts (VCA) in 2009, before going on to study at Melbourne's 16th Street Acting Studio. She has since studied at Howard Fine Acting Studio in Los Angeles in 2016 and 2017.

== Career ==
Wheelwright's first major acting credit was in 2010 Australian crime film Animal Kingdom, alongside Ben Mendelsohn, Joel Edgerton and Guy Pearce, in which she played the role of Nicky Henry. She was 18 years old and midway through her acting course when she received the part and following the completion of the film, she continued her acting studies. She was nominated for Best Performing Actress at the 2010 AFI Awards for the role.

Wheelwright went on to play the female supporting lead in the 2012 Network Ten docudrama Underground: The Julian Assange Story for which she received an AACTA nomination for Best Guest or Supporting Actress in a Television Drama. She won the Best Female Actor Award at the 2013 Tropfest short film festival for her part in the winning film We've All Been There.

Wheelwright played a Canadian tourist in season 2 of the horror television series Wolf Creek. She has also had guest roles in Winners & Losers, Miss Fisher's Murder Mysteries, Ms Fisher's Modern Murder Mysteries, Get Krack!n and Informer 3838.

In 2018, Wheelwright wrote, produced and starred in short film Happy Memories. She also produced and had the lead role in short film The Body, which premiered at Cannes Film Festival in 2025.

== Awards ==
Year	Work	Award	Category	Result	Ref.
2010	Animal Kingdom	Australian Film Institute Awards	Best Actress	Nominated	
2012	Underground: The Julian Assange Story	AACTA Awards	Best Guest or Supporting Actress in a Television Drama	Nominated	
2012	Underground: The Julian Assange Story	Equity Ensemble Awards	Outstanding Performance by an Ensemble in a Miniseries or Telemovie	Nominated	
2014	We've All Been There	Tropfest	Best Female Actor	Won	
2014	The Kingdom of Doug	St Kilda Short Film Festival	Best Actor	Nominated	

== Filmography ==
=== Film ===
Year	Title	Role	Notes
2005	Charlotte's Web	Carnival Girl	
2010	Animal Kingdom	Nicole 'Nicky' Henry	
2011	Silent Night	Chantelle	Short film
2012	Wakey Wakey	Josie	
2013	We've All Been There	Jess	Short film
2013	Aislinn	Kyr	Short film
2013	The Kingdom of Doug	Josie	Short film
2016	1000 Cigarettes	Josie	Short film
2017	Rehab	Lizzie	Short film
2018	Happy Memories	Drea	Short film (also writer/producer)
2020	Hannah and the Friendzone	Hannah	Short film
2020	Time Addicts	Denise	Short film
2020	After the End	Ophelia	
2025	The Body	Jane	Short film (also producer)

=== Television ===
Year	Title	Role	Notes
2012	Underground: The Julian Assange Story	Electra	TV movie
2012	Winners & Losers	Nadia	4 episodes
2012	Miss Fisher's Murder Mysteries	Alice	2 episodes
2017	Wolf Creek	Kelly Yeoman	Season 2, 6 episodes
2018	The Housemate	Molly B	6 episodes
2019	Help: The Series	Mystery	
2019	Get Krack!n	Isla Bedford	1 episode
2020	Informer 3838	Nikki Hodson	1 episode
2021	Ms Fisher's Modern Murder Mysteries	Babs Crawford	1 episode

=== Music videos ===
Year	Title	Artist	Role	Ref.
2016	Madness	Tom Lee Richards	Woman	

== Theatre ==
Year	Title	Role	Notes	Ref.
2007	Motor-Mouth and Suck-Face	Tank (lead)	St Martins Youth Theatre, Melbourne	
2010	Wake in Fright	Janette	Northcote Town Hall with La Trobe University, Melbourne	
2013	The Boys	Michelle (lead)	Blackwater Theatre with Revolt Productions	
2013	The Woolgatherer	Rose (lead)	La Mama, Melbourne	
