= David Lightfoot =

Australian film producer (died 2021)

David Lightfoot (1960 – 13 June 2021) was an Australian film producer.

== Biography ==
Lightfoot worked on the horror films Wolf Creek and Rogue. Other credits include Bad Boy Bubby, Three Forever, The Sound of One Hand Clapping, and Coffin Rock.

He trained at the South Australian Film Corporation in 1982. He was founding director of the SHORTS Film Festival, an Adelaide-based National festival.

In 2014, Lightfoot completed the action thriller Turkey Shoot a.k.a. Elimination Game for writer/director Jon Hewitt and producer Anthony I Ginnane and also writer/director Jim Lounsbury and producer Behren Shulz's love story Love Is Now, which won best foreign film at Mexico and Arizona Film Festivals in 2015. He finished working on A Few Less Men for Larry Malkin, Share Stallings and Tania Chambers in Western Australia in 2016.

Completed in 2017 was the thriller Bad Blood, which Lightfoot produced with Antony I. Ginnane. It was written and directed by David Pulbrook. Bad Blood premiered at the Adelaide Film Festival in October 2017 and garnered overseas sales. Also in 2017, he co-produced 1%, produced by Michael Pontin and Jamie Hilton and directed by Steven McCullum. It was selected and premiered at the Toronto Film Festival in 2017 and also screened at the Adelaide and London Film Festivals in October.

He and Ultrafilms were heavily in development in several feature films and long form television/streaming productions, slated for 2018/19.

Lightfoot died in Adelaide, South Australia on 13 June 2021, aged 61. He is survived by his son, Josh.

== See also ==
- List of Australian films
