= Rogue (2007 film) =

Australian horror film by Greg McLean

- Theatrical release poster
- Directed by: Greg McLean
- Written by: Greg McLean
- Produced by: Matt Hearn; David Lightfoot; Greg McLean
- Starring: Michael Vartan; Radha Mitchell; Sam Worthington
- Cinematography: Will Gibson
- Edited by: Jason Ballantine
- Music by: Frank Tetaz
- Production companies: Dimension Films; Village Roadshow Pictures; Emu Creek Productions
- Distributed by: Roadshow Films (Australia); The Weinstein Company (International)
- Release date: 8 November 2007
- Running time: 92 minutes
- Countries: Australia; United States
- Language: English
- Budget: $25 million
- Box office: $4.6 million

Rogue is a 2007 horror film written and directed by Greg McLean. Starring Michael Vartan, Radha Mitchell and Sam Worthington, it follows a group of tourists in Australia who fall prey to a 7+ metre long saltwater crocodile.

The film was inspired by the true story of Sweetheart, a giant male saltwater crocodile that attacked boats in the late 1970s, although Sweetheart was never responsible for an attack on a human. Rogue received positive reviews from critics, but was a commercial failure.

It is the second and last film from Dimension Films to have the involvement of Village Roadshow Pictures, the other being 1992's Fortress.

== Plot ==
In the remote swamps of Australia's Northern Territory, a wild cow drinking from the edge of a lake is suddenly attacked, and devoured by a ferocious, powerful crocodile.

American travel journalist Pete McKell joins a small group of tourists on a crocodile-watching river cruise in Kakadu National Park of Northern Territory, led by wildlife researcher Kate Ryan. After the cruise concludes, a passenger Everett spots a flare in the distance, prompting Kate to head upriver to investigate. While traveling miles upriver, the passengers become anxious, the silence is becoming heavy; the landscape is turning hostile and dense and realizing they have entered unmapped territory. They come across a half-sunken boat wreck with no survivors. As the group figure out about the origin of the flare, a big reptilian shadow beneath the surface crashes into the boat, damaging the starboard side.

Kate manages to steer the sinking boat to a small piece of land in the middle of the river. Kate believes they are in the territory of a large crocodile. She explains that they must leave the island by nightfall, before the tide rises, and submerges the land. After a brief scuffle between the tourists, Everett is silently dragged away by an unseen creature as he stands on the riverbank. Two locals Neil Kelly and Collin, arrive to track down their missing river cruise, but the creature upturns their boat. Neil swims to safety while Collin disappears.

At night, Neil devises an escape plan by carefully swimming to the opposite riverbank to string a rope between two trees, creating a guide line for the group to safely cross the river. Everett's wife Mary Ellen crosses first, only to freeze in fear halfway across. Impatient, Allen attempts to get himself and his daughter Sherry across with Mary Ellen still on the line. While trying to secure the rope due to the sheer weight of the family, Neil is ambushed and killed by the creature. The tree holding the rope breaks, and the three tourists fall into the water. After frantically swimming back to the island, the creature snatches Allen, throws him back into the river, and devours him. It is revealed to be a rogue, 7+ metre long saltwater crocodile.

Pete suggests baiting the crocodile to anchor it on one side, allowing everyone else to swim to the other side, using Neil's two dead gooses instead of Kate's dog named Kevin. After a long wait, the bait is suddenly pulled, and the group makes a break for the far shore. The crocodile eventually lets go, seizes Kate and drags her away underwater. Pete hurries across the river with Kevin in tow and into the bush behind the others. The next morning, Pete chases Kevin into the bush after he runs off. He falls down a narrow chute into a large cave, where he discovers Neil's mangled body. The cave is revealed to be the crocodile's lair and Kevin leads him to a severely injured Kate. Pete attempts to carry her out, but a startled Kevin runs ahead towards the cave entrance where he is ambushed.

The crocodile devours Kevin's torn corpse and falls asleep to digest its meal. Pete attempts to sneak out of the cave with the unconscious Kate. It senses their presence, and silently dives back into the murky water to attack Pete from behind, narrowly missing him. After several attempts to catch them, the crocodile takes a chunk out of Pete's hand while he grabs a piece of bone and stabs one of its eyes. Pete eventually props a large broken log against a boulder, with the sharp end pointing outwards to impale it. The beast lunges at Pete, and dies. Pete escapes from the cave with Kate, and carries her body into the open daylight of the swamp.

A newspaper article details Pete's heroic battle with the beast and his rescue of Kate, which happens right before they are tended by paramedics.

== Cast ==
- Michael Vartan as Pete McKell
- Radha Mitchell as Kate Ryan
- Sam Worthington as Neil Kelly
- Caroline Brazier as Mary Ellen
- Stephen Curry as Simon
- Celia Ireland as Gwen
- John Jarratt as Russell
- Robert Taylor as Everett Kennedy
- Damien Richardson as Collin
- Heather Mitchell as Elizabeth Smith
- Geoff Morrell as Allen Smith
- Mia Wasikowska as Sherry Smith
- Barry Otto as Merv
- Burt as the crocodile

== Production ==
=== Initial development ===
Greg McLean first wrote the script for Rogue in 1995. When McLean first started writing screenplays, he cited his influences as his childhood viewing of Keith Adams' documentary film Northern Safari and the wondrous impression of Australia's Northern Territory and its saltwater crocodiles as well as his desire to do a horror film where a cast of characters are stranded in an isolated locale. McLean had set up Rogue with Mushroom Pictures and Liberty & Beyond Productions and had intended to make his directorial debut with the film, however, the project defaulted on a grant from the Film Finance Corporation Australia in April 2000. In June 2001, it was reported that Mushroom Pictures and Liberty & Beyond had formed a deal with Beyond Films and Spice Factory to co-produce the film with McLean removed from the project and replaced with Kimble Rendall in the hopes of salvaging the project. After the project collapsed, McLean set his sights on a less ambitious project with which to make his directorial debut which ultimately ended up being Wolf Creek.

=== Revival ===
Following the success of McLean's Wolf Creek, this gave McLean the clout he needed to pursue a larger project on the scale of Rogue. In September 2005, it was reported The Weinstein Company, who had previously acquired North American distribution rights for McLean's Wolf Creek, had come on board to finance Rogue as McLean's second effort, to be released some time in 2006 through Weinstein's Dimension Films label. In November of that year, it was reported Radha Mitchell, Michael Vartan and Sam Worthington had been signed to star in the film with production set to begin that month.

According to McLean, after another crocodile movie, Primeval, under-performed at the box office The Weinstein Company didn't give the film the promotional push they'd initially planned. In May 2007, it was reported The Weinstein Company would give the film a direct-to-video release through their recently established label Dimension Extreme.

Filming took place on-location around Yellow Water Billabong, Katherine Gorge, and Arnhem Land.

== Release ==
=== Home media ===
Rogue was released on DVD in Australia on 29 May 2008. The DVD's special features include "The Making of Rogue" documentary, four featurettes, and a theatrical trailer. The US and UK DVDs feature an additional audio commentary. As of 2013, Rogue has been released on Blu-ray in Canada and the UK. The Canadian disc features the film only, whilst the UK disc includes all of the aforementioned extras, bar the trailer.

== Reception ==
=== Box office ===
Rogue debuted in the Australian box office on 11 November 2007 making A$667,194. After 11 weeks in the nation's cinemas, it left making A$1.8 million. It was released in the United States on 25 April 2008 to only 10 theaters. In its first weekend, it made US$7,711 and remained in theatres for four more days before exiting with a domestic total of US$10,452. As of 8 November 2009, Rogue has made A$5,984,448 worldwide.

=== Critical response ===
On the review aggregate website Rotten Tomatoes, the film has an 83% approval rating, based on 18 critic reviews, with an average rating of 7.3/10.

Melbourne's Herald Sun critic Leigh Paatsch gave the film three out of five stars stating that, "If you must see at least one killer croc movie before you die, it may as well be this polished little Australian schlocker". Sydney Morning Herald critic Sandra Hall gave the movie three and a half out of five stars writing that, "[I]t's almost elegant. Its only disadvantage is it conjures up inevitable comparisons with Jaws...a benchmark the film has no hope of achieving". Variety's Richard Kuipers praised the film as a fairly formulaic but solid B-movie with good visual effects, "regular scares[,] and a monster worth the ticket price."

== Accolades ==
Award	Category	Subject	Result
AACTA Award (2008 AFI Awards)	Best Visual Effects	Andrew Hellen	Won
AACTA Award (2008 AFI Awards)	Best Visual Effects	Dave Morley	Won
AACTA Award (2008 AFI Awards)	Best Visual Effects	Jason Bath	Won
AACTA Award (2008 AFI Awards)	Best Visual Effects	John Cox	Won
Australian Screen Editors	Avid Award for Best Editing on a Feature Film	Jason Ballantine	Nominated
AWGIE Award	Best Original Feature Film	Greg McLean	Nominated
Fangoria Chainsaw Award	Best Limited-Release/Direct-to-Video Film		3rd place
Sitges Film Festival	Best Film	Greg McLean	Nominated

== See also ==
- Cinema of Australia
- List of killer crocodile films
- Sweetheart
- Black Water, another 2007 Australian horror film about a killer crocodile
- Dark Age (1987), an Australian horror film about a killer crocodile, also starring John Jarratt
