= Greg McLean (filmmaker) =

Australian film director

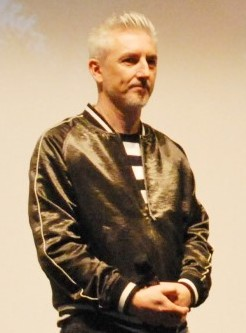
- McLean in Toronto, 2016
- Born: 1953 (age 72–73); Australia
- Occupations: Film director; writer; producer
- Years active: 1993–present

Greg McLean is an Australian filmmaker, principally of horror films. He rose to fame in 2005 with his debut feature film, Wolf Creek, creating the character Mick Taylor (played by John Jarratt). The sequel to his first feature, Wolf Creek 2 was released February 2013. Mclean also wrote, directed and produced Rogue (2007) and was executive producer of Red Hill (2010) and Crawlspace (2012). He is also the co-author of two novels about Mick Taylor; Wolf Creek: Origin (with Aaron Sterns) and Wolf Creek: Desolation Game (with Brett McBean) and the four-part comic book series Dark Axis: Secret Battles of WW2 and the graphic novel Sebastian Hawks – Creature Hunter. In 2016, his film, The Darkness, was released, and a Wolf Creek TV series was released on Australian streaming service Stan.

== Early life and education ==
McLean was raised on a farm in Emu Creek on the outskirts of Bendigo, Victoria, Australia. He attended Eppalock Primary School and later, Catherine McAuley College, a Catholic secondary school.

In university, he initially studied painting before enrolling at the National Institute of Dramatic Art (NIDA), completing a graduate diploma in directing.

== Career ==
In his early career he worked with theatre director Neil Armfield, and with Baz Luhrmann and Catherine Martin at Opera Australia.

McLean's first short film, Plead, won a Gold award from the Australian Cinematographers Society (ACS). His short film ICQ screened at the New York International Independent Film and Video Festival, winning "Best Director of a Short Film". Under his production company GMF (Greg McLean Film), McLean produced television commercials and similar work.

McLean's first full-length film was the 2005 Australian independent horror film Wolf Creek. Reviews were mixed, but it achieved a cult following. In the United States, it received an NC-17 rating until being edited to obtain an R rating.

Mclean's next film Rogue, in 2007, was about a deadly salt-water crocodile attacking an international group of tourists in Australia's Northern Territory. He was one of the candidates to direct Paranormal Activity 2. McLean produced the Justin Dix thriller Crawlspace.

In February 2013, McLean returned as co-writer (with Aaron Sterns), producer and director for Wolf Creek 2, the sequel to Wolf Creek. John Jarratt reprised his role as serial killer Mick Taylor and co-starred with Ryan Corr.

After this success, McLean established the production company Emu Creek Pictures. He then wrote, directed, and produced the thrillers The Darkness, The Belko Experiment, and Jungle. He then executive produced and directed episodes of the Wolf Creek TV series as well as The Gloaming, Bloom, Jack Irish, La Brea, The Twelve and Scrublands. In 2024, he was series director for the Netflix series Territory.

Recently, Greg joined fellow Australian director Patrick Hughes, along with screenwriter James Beaufort, in establishing the production company Huge Film. The action/sci-fi feature War Machine (produced by McLean) is the first project from this new entity.

== Filmography ==
=== Film ===
Year	Title	Director	Producer	Writer	Notes
1993	Plead	Yes	No	No	Short film
2001	ICQ	Yes	Yes	Yes	Short film
2005	Wolf Creek	Yes	Yes	Yes	
2007	Rogue	Yes	Yes	Yes	
2013	Wolf Creek 2	Yes	Yes	Yes	
2016	The Darkness	Yes	Executive	Yes	
2016	The Belko Experiment	Yes	No	No	
2017	Jungle	Yes	Yes	No	
2026	War Machine	No	Yes	No	
2026	Wolf Creek: Legacy	No	Yes	No	

Executive producer

- The Edge of Reality (2009) (Short film)
- Red Hill (2010)
- Crawlspace (2012)
- The Legend of Ben Hall (2016)
- Down Under (2016)

Acting roles

Year	Title	Role
2005	Wolf Creek	Old Man's Body and Police Officer
2015	Tales of Halloween	Ray Bishop

=== Television ===
Year	Title	Director	Executive Producer	Writer	Notes
2016–17	Wolf Creek	Yes	Yes	Yes	3 episodes
2020	The Gloaming	Yes	No	No	4 episodes
2020	Bloom	Yes	No	No	3 episodes
2021	Jack Irish	Yes	No	No	4 episodes
2021–23	La Brea	Yes	No	No	2 episodes
2022	The Twelve	Yes	No	No	2 episodes
2023	Scrublands	Yes	No	No	4 episodes
2024	Territory	Yes	No	No	6 episodes
