= Ben Gerrard =

Australian actor (born 1988)

- Born: Melbourne, Victoria, Australia
- Occupation: Actor
- Years active: 2007–present

Ben Gerrard is an Australian actor. He is known for his role as Toby in the ABC television series Outland (2012). He also appeared as Constable Brian O'Connor in Wolf Creek 2 (2013) and as multiple characters on the sketch comedy series Open Slather (2015). Gerrard played 35 characters in the one-man show I Am My Own Wife, which debuted in 2015. In 2016, he played Molly Meldrum's transgender friend Caroline Jenkins in the two-part miniseries Molly, for which he was nominated for an AACTA Award for Best Guest or Supporting Actor in Television Drama.

Gerrard graduated from the National Institute of Dramatic Arts (NIDA) in 2006.

== Filmography ==
=== Film appearances ===
| Year | Title | Role | Notes |
|---|---|---|---|
| 2026 | The Birthday Trip (film) | Mark McDonald | |
| 2024 | Die Bully Die | Shane the Waiter | Short |
| 2024 | The Fall Guy | Kevin | |
| 2022 | Svengali | Ivan Roberts | Short |
| 2021 | Monsters | Rob-Doctor | Short |
| 2013 | Wolf Creek 2 | Constable Brian Connor | |
| 2010 | Veneer | Henry | Short |
| 2009 | Dream the Life | Glenn | Short |
| 2009 | Street Angel | Pimp | Short |

=== Television appearances ===
| Year | Title | Role | Notes |
|---|---|---|---|
| 2020 | Ding Dong I'm Gay | Randy | 2 episodes |
| 2016 | Deep Water | Dan | 2 episodes |
| 2016 | A Place to Call Home | Paul | 1 episode |
| 2016 | Molly | Caroline | Miniseries; 2 episodes |
| 2015 | Open Slather | Various | 20 episodes |
| 2014 | Jack Irish: Dead Point | Xavier | TV Movie |
| 2012 | Outland | Toby | 6 episodes |
| 2007 | Chandon Pictures | Young Guy | 1 episode |
| 2007 | All Saints | Alex Wilson | 1 episode |
