= Wolf Creek (TV series) =

2016 Australian horror television series

- Genre: Drama; Horror; Psychological horror
- Created by: Greg McLean
- Written by: Peter Gawler; Felicity Packard
- Directed by: Greg McLean; Tony Tilse
- Starring: John Jarratt; Lucy Fry; Dustin Clare; Tess Haubrich; Matt Day
- Country of origin: Australia
- Original language: English
- No. of seasons: 2
- No. of episodes: 12

Production
- Executive producers: Greg Haddrick; Greg McLean; Jo Rooney; Andy Ryan; Nick Forward; Rob Gibson
- Producers: Peter Gawler (s1); Elisa Argenzio (s1); Lisa Scott (s2); Kerrie Mainwaring (s2)
- Cinematography: Geoffrey Hall
- Running time: 43–61 minutes
- Production companies: Screentime; Emu Creek Pictures

Original release
- Network: Stan
- Release: 12 May 2016 – 15 December 2017

Wolf Creek is an Australian horror television series that aired on Stan. The show is a spin-off continuation of the continuity established in the movies, and is the third installment in the Wolf Creek franchise. John Jarratt, who portrayed Mick Taylor in the films, reprises his role for the show.

The first season of Wolf Creek consisted of six episodes and was released on 12 May 2016. The show was renewed for a second season of six episodes in February 2017, which was released on 15 December 2017.

== Plot overview ==
=== Season 1 ===
The Thorogood family, who is vacationing in Australia, is attacked and annihilated by Mick Taylor, save only Eve, their 19-year-old daughter. Eve thus embarks on a mission of revenge through The Australian outback to find and kill Taylor, helped by Det. Sullivan Hill.

=== Season 2 ===
An outback safari bus, bringing a group of international tourists, is abducted by Mick Taylor who drugs the group and leaves them in the middle of the Southern outback desert, disabling (and later blowing up) the bus. The survivors go on a desperate journey through the outback, fighting for their lives as Taylor hunts them down.

== Cast ==
=== Main ===
- John Jarratt as Mick Taylor, a psychopathic serial killer who hunts his victims in the Australian outback.

==== Season 1 ====
- Lucy Fry as Eve Thorogood, an American college student and recovering drug addict who vacations in the Australian Northern Territory with her family, survives Taylor's annihilation of her family, and goes on a hunter-becomes-hunted type of journey to track down Taylor.
- Dustin Clare as Det. Sgt. Sullivan Hill, a police officer of the Northern Territory Police Force who crosses paths with Thorogood and eventually helps her taking revenge on Taylor.

==== Season 2 ====
- Tess Haubrich as Rebecca Michaels, an American young entrepreneur who vacations in Australia with her husband Danny; she is part of the Outback coach crew that Taylor abducts.
- Matt Day as Brian, a former psychiatric inmate from England, posing himself as a forensic psychiatrist, and another member of the abducted coach crew.

=== Recurring and guest ===
==== Season 1 ====
- Deborah Mailman as Bernadette O'Dell, the owner of the Face of the Madonna Roadhouse near the Salt Lake Campsite in Southern Australia.
- Maya Stange as Ingrid Thorogood, Eve's mother.
- Damian De Montemas as Inspector Darwin, Hill's partner in the police.
- Miranda Tapsell as Fatima Johnson, an agent of Hill's squad.
- Robert Taylor as Roland Thorogood, Eve's father.
- Matt Levett as Kevin Small, a man Eve meets in Kutyukutyu.
- Richard Cawthorne as Kane Jurkewitz, the leader of a gang of bikers and robbers.
- Rachel House as Ruth Ngata, a Maori truck driver.
- Jessica Tovey as Kirsty Hill, Sgt. Hill's wife.
- Eddie Baroo as Ginger Jurkewitz, Kane's brother.
- Alicia Gardiner as Snr Cst Janine Howard.
- Fletcher Humphrys as Jesus (Ben Mitchell), a resident of Rome, Queensland whom Taylor abducted in 1999.
- Liana Cornell as Ann-Marie, a coworker and friend of Eve.

==== Season 2 ====
- Felicity Price as Nina Webber, Oskar's wife.
- Julian Pulvermacher as Oskar Webber, a German mining engineer and Nina's husband.
- Jason Chong as Steve Cham, Johnny's boyfriend.
- Adam Fiorentino as Johnny Rossi, Steve's boyfriend.
- Charlie Clausen as Danny Michaels, Rebecca's husband.
- Christopher Kirby as Bruce Walker, an American tourist and a Gulf War veteran.
- Laura Wheelwright as Kelly Yeoman, a Canadian backpacker and Michelle's friend.
- Elsa Cocquerel as Michelle Scott, a Canadian backpacker, as well as Kelly's friend and love interest.
- Josephine Langford as Emma Webber, Oskar and Nina's teenager daughter.
- Elijah Williams as Wade Cheti, a cheesy young man from Adelaide.
- Ben Oxenbould as Ian "Davo" Davidson, the tour guide and coach driver.
- Stephen Hunter as Richie, a tourist from New Zealand.
- Chris Haywood as Tom.
- Cohen McRae as Danny, the young child of Spencer and Ollie.

== Episodes ==
=== Season 1 (2016) ===
No. overall	No. in season	Title	Directed by	Written by	Original release date
1	1	"Billabong"	Tony Tilse	Peter Gawler	12 May 2016
American teenager Eve narrowly escapes outback serial killer Taylor when he slaughters her family at their billabong campsite in Australia's Northern Territory. Shot and left for dead, she is found by two birdwatchers and taken to hospital in Darwin. Police detective Sullivan Hill looks into her case, with her family's disappearance resembling a number of other missing persons cases over many years. However instead of returning to the United States, Eve steals Hill's case file, buys a van and heads into the outback seeking revenge.
2	2	"Kutyukutyu"	Tony Tilse	Felicity Packard	12 May 2016
In Kutyukutyu, Western Australia, Eve runs afoul of the local police when she crashes into their car and they find a bag of marijuana left in the van by the previous owners. She manages to escape from her cell, and locates Hill who has arrived in town looking for her. Escaping the police as they arrive at Hill's motel, she heads to the house of her former cellmate, a bikie named Kane, to steal money and a gun from an armed robbery he had committed. Taylor hears that an American girl has been looking for him.
3	3	"Salt Lake"	Tony Tilse	Peter Gawler	12 May 2016
At Salt Lake, South Australia, Eve is attacked by Kevin, who had previously assaulted her in WA. She shoots him in the leg and leaves him on the road, where Taylor picks him up, then kills and mutilates him. At the Face of the Madonna Roadhouse, Hill, Taylor and the bikies turn up at different times looking for Eve. Stuck with a broken wheel, Eve helps a convict who has escaped from a crashed prison van. Kane finds her and says that he wants her to have his children, but Eve shoots and kills him as he advances towards her. Eve drives to Opalville, where she hears Taylor is headed, but he is waiting for her.
4	4	"Opalville"	Tony Tilse	Felicity Packard	12 May 2016
Eve arrives at the mining town of Opalville, but Taylor isn't there, although he killed two tourists driving the same type of van as she. Posing as a journalist, Eve follows up the case of a missing girl from the town, Holly Welles. Speaking to Holly's parents, she discovers that the girl was killed by her own father, and as Eve tries to escape from him, one of his venomous snakes bites her. She is saved by an Aboriginal man, who teaches her to use a woomera spear-thrower. Sergeant Hill tracks Eve to Opalville, but she escapes and heads to the town of Rome, where she deduces Taylor will turn up.
5	5	"Rome"	Tony Tilse	Peter Gawler	12 May 2016
Eve takes a job as a waitress in the town of Rome, and waits for Taylor to arrive. Hill finds her again, and they resolve to work together to kill Taylor as they agree he would walk free if arrested. As Eve goes to talk to Ben, aka "Jesus", one of Taylor's escaped victims, Taylor turns up in Rome and stabs Hill, abducting him. Eve arranges to ambush Taylor at a graveyard, but she is attacked by the bikies from Kutyukutyu seeking revenge for Kane's death. As she is about to be killed, she is saved by Johnny, the convict she helped earlier. The two share a kiss, but Eve sends him away. She wakes to find her guns gone, and Johnny beheaded by Taylor.
6	6	"Wolf Creek"	Greg McLean	Felicity Packard	12 May 2016
Eve convinces Ben to tell her the location of the meteorite crater in Wolf Creek National Park near to where he was abducted by Taylor. In the crater she finds Johnny's head and a scrapbook of news clippings about Taylor's troubled childhood, including his abusive father and the disappearance of his sister (who Taylor accidentally killed). At Wolf Creek township, Eve makes her way to the Taylor property, where she finds Hill tied up in the shed. Taylor attacks them, and Hill brings the roof down on them, killing himself in the process. Badly wounded, Eve confronts Taylor in the house where she manages to impale him with a fire poker, presumably killing him. She burns the house down and puts Hill's body under a tree, later finding that Taylor's body is gone. She is picked up by Ruth the truckie and her dog and they head to Perth. A mid-credits scene shows a blue truck speeding down the road.

=== Season 2 (2017) ===
No. overall	No. in season	Title	Directed by	Written by	Original release date
7	1	"Journey"	Greg McLean	Nick Parsons	15 December 2017
A group of tourists sets off from Adelaide on an outback adventure tour: German couple Oskar and Nina, and their daughter Emma; married American couple Rebecca and Danny; gay Australian couple Johnny and Steve; Canadian best friends Kelly and Michelle; Iraq War veteran Bruce; English psychiatrist Brian; South Australian Wade; and New Zealander bus enthusiast Ritchie. At a truck stop, their driver Davo encounters Mick Taylor, who takes offence and follows Davo, killing him in a toilet block. When the tour group wakes up, they find Mick driving the bus, claiming he is their replacement driver.
8	2	"Outback"	Greg McLean	Shanti Gudgeon	15 December 2017
After a lengthy bush walk, Mick plies the tourists with "rainwater from the Top End", which he has drugged. The group passes out, and awakens over a day later with the bus in the middle of the outback. Mick is nowhere to be seen, and Ritchie, the battery and satellite phone are gone. Mick cuts Ritchie's tongue out and buries him alive in a termite nest. Danny and Johnny head out to look for help, and run into Mick. The rest of the group is horrified to find Davo's body in the refrigerated trailer, and realise Mick could be responsible. As several of the group investigate some noises outside, Mick fires his rifle at the bus's gas tanks, causing it to explode with Wade and Emma inside, badly burning Michelle and impaling Bruce with shrapnel.
9	3	"Chase"	Kieran Darcy-Smith	Nick Parsons	15 December 2017
The survivors leave the bus wreck, carrying Michelle with them. Rebecca and Brian return to fetch Oskar's pills, as Mick also returns. Rebecca lures him away by lighting a fire, then she and Brian disable his truck and take his shotgun and water. The group takes shelter from a storm under an overhang, although Steve and Kelly run out after seeing a car, convinced Mick couldn't have fixed his truck so quickly. Brian suffocates Michelle, believing she is slowing them down and will die from her burns anyway.
10	4	"Singing"	Kieran Darcy-Smith	Mark Dapin & Greg Haddrick	15 December 2017
Rebecca, Brian, Oskar and Nina head for the ridge after covering Michelle with a tarp. Steve is found by two Aboriginal trackers, Patrick and Dino—the two are aware of Mick, who they call 'spirit man'. They flee after being warned off and shot at by Mick, but he later catches up with them, shooting Patrick and stabbing Dino, then abducting Steve. Kelly turns up holding Dino's dropped rifle, but Mick tricks her, stabs Steve with a fork and takes her hostage. Dino is found by Uncle Moses, who heals him and then performs a singing ritual which incapacitates Mick, although he manages to revive and kill them. Nina is bitten by a snake, slowing the group down even more. They see the lights of a mine site in the distance.
11	5	"Shelter"	Geoff Bennett	Shanti Gudgeon	15 December 2017
Kelly wakes up in Mick's lair, where he says he will break her to find the location of her friends. Rebecca, Brian, Oskar and Nina arrive at the mine site where they meet a young boy, Danny, and his parents. The father, Spence, tells Oskar that the mine closed after three men died in an incident he attributes to infrasonic waves from the Wolf Creek crater. Mick arrives, sharing a few drinks with Spence before killing him and his family and searching the site. Rebecca and Oskar try to restart Mick and Spence's trucks so they can get to Mick's lair and find some fuel and hopefully survivors. Trapping Mick in a shed, they manage to transfer some petrol and escape. Rebecca and Brian are relieved to see the other truck following, unaware that Mick has killed Oskar and is driving with a catatonic Nina.
12	6	"Return"	Geoff Bennett	Mark Dapin & Greg Haddrick	15 December 2017
Mick blows a tire, slowing him down while Rebecca and Brian arrive at his lair. Brian looks for petrol, while Rebecca explores the mine tunnels looking for Danny. Mick arrives and locks the shed Brian is in, but he gets out and prepares to escape on his own. Rebecca steps on a spike, but manages to kill Mick's dog and find Danny and Kelly still alive. Mick catches Brian leaving, but Brian manages to talk Mick into letting him go as they both have a callous disregard for others. Brian returns for the truck keys, killing Nina when she refuses to hand them over, and admitting he was actually a psychiatric inmate, not a psychiatrist as he had previously told the group. Mick changes his mind and shoots Brian, killing him. As he pursues Kelly, Rebecca ignites the petrol in the tunnels, blowing up the mine, with her still inside. Mick later catches up to Kelly, but decides to let her go, believing that she will die before she can reach the nearest town. Later, in an outback pub, Mick watches a news story about the tour group's disappearance. In a post-credit scene, Kelly collapses in the desert, but opens her eyes as her phone gets reception and starts to beep and vibrate.

== Production ==
In October 2016, Jarratt suggested that Wolf Creek would be returning for a second season and a later film. Stan officially announced that Wolf Creek had been renewed in February 2017 and would be released in late 2017. Filming began in South Australia in July 2017. The six-episode second season saw John Jarratt reprise his role as Mick Taylor, alongside new cast members Tess Haubrich, Matt Day, Ben Oxenbould, Laura Wheelwright, Stephen Hunter and Chris Haywood. The story centres around Taylor meeting a coach full of international tourists – a complete departure from the first season's storyline which sees the show become an anthology style program, and won't see Fry reprise her role as Eve Thorogood. The second season was released on 15 December 2017.

Greg McLean returned as showrunner and director, along with Kieran Darcy-Smith and Geoff Bennett. Lisa Scott and Kerrie Mainwaring were producers for the series. Executive producers were Rory Callaghan, Greg Haddrick, Greg McLean, Nick Forward and Rob Gibson. Writers on the series were Nick Parsons, Shanti Gudgeon and Mark Dapin.

== Reception ==
The series has received generally positive reviews. Nikole Gunn of Decider TV wrote, "It’s beautifully filmed with cinematography usually reserved for the 'Big Screen'" and that "It's chilling and unforgettable". David Knox of TV Tonight awarded the premiere four out of five stars and wrote, "If there's a box Wolf Creek hasn’t got checked, it's hard to find here".

Within the first four days of the first season being made available, more than 500,000 viewers sampled the program, including 40,000 subscribers who watched all six episodes.

== Broadcast ==
Broadcast rights for Wolf Creek in North American and Latin American markets were acquired by Lionsgate, and the show aired in the United States for a limited time from 14 October to 18 November 2016 on the Pop channel, which Lionsgate held a stake in at the time. In the UK, the series aired on Fox in August 2016.

== Awards and nominations ==
Year	Award	Category	Nominee	Result	Ref
2016	AACTA Awards	Best Cinematography in Television	Geoffrey Hall	Won	
2017	Fangoria Chainsaw Awards	Best TV Actress	Lucy Fry	Nominated	
