= Shannon Ashlyn =

Australian actress

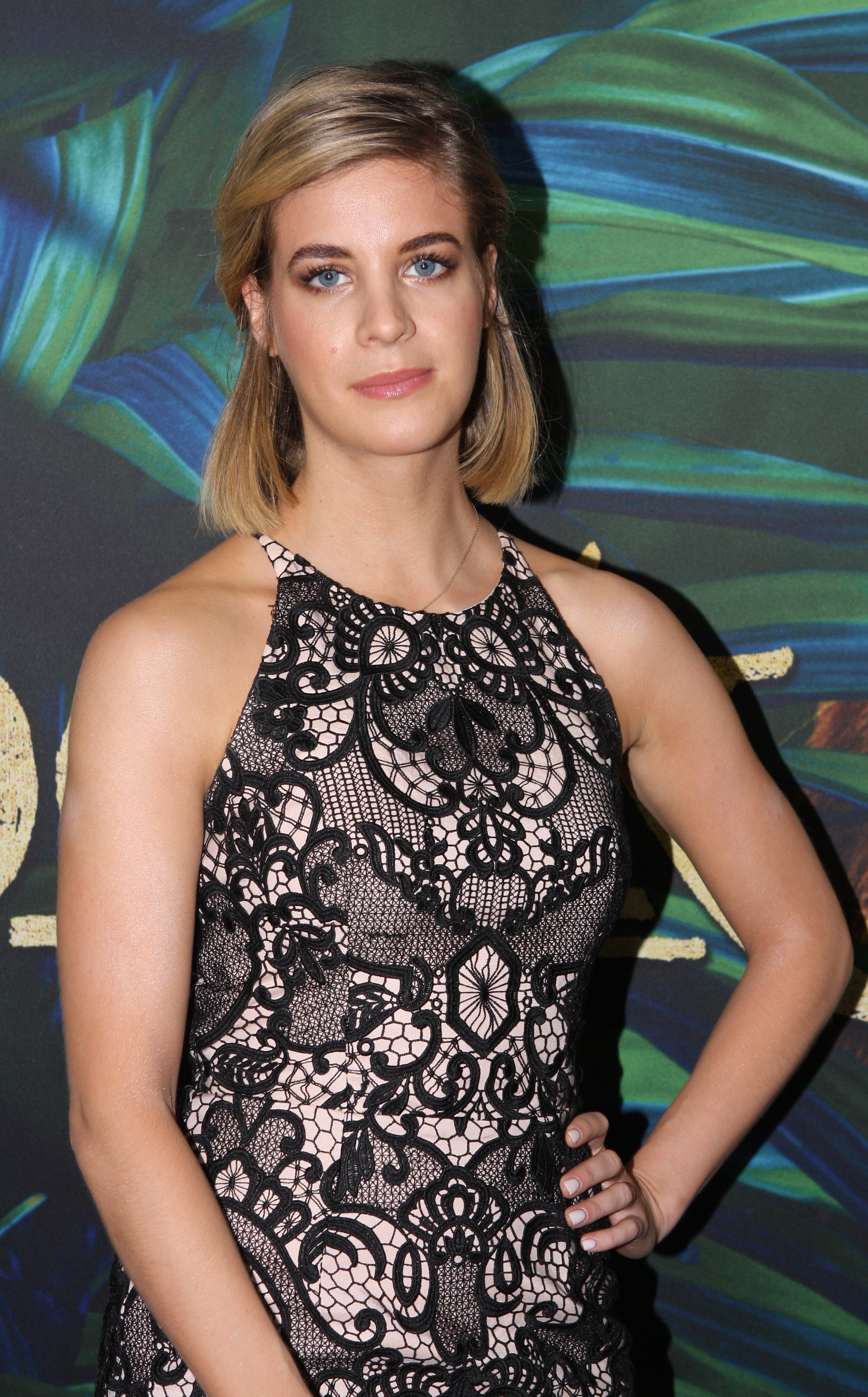
- Born: 20 February 1986 (age 40)
- Occupations: Director; writer; producer; actor
- Years active: 2011–present
- Known for: Wolf Creek 2, Love Child, Zelos, Sweet Tooth

Shannon Ashlyn (born 20 February 1986) is a film and television actress, writer and director, known for her roles in the Australian horror film Wolf Creek 2, the Australian television series Love Child and the film Zelos. In 2018, she completed a Masters of Directing at the Australian Film Television and Radio School in Sydney, Australia. Sweet Tooth is her graduating film.

== Filmography ==
Film

Year	Film	Role	Notes
2017	Zelos	Sarah	Post-Production
2015	Nineteen	Sophie	Short Film
2014	The Woodcutter	Alex	Short Film
2013	Hard	Emma	Short Film
2013	Wolf Creek 2	Katarina Schmidt	
2013	The Road Home	Kirsty	Short Film
2013	Inside	The Patient	Short Film
2012	Reset	Nurse	Short Film
2012	Dripping in Chocolate	Lucy	TV movie

Television

Year	TV Show	Role	Notes
2014	Love Child	Nurse Susie	7 episodes
2012	Devil's Dust	Sarah Bourke	TV mini-series
2011	Packed to the Rafters	Mia	Episode: The Male Communication Handbook
