= John Jarratt =

Australian actor and director

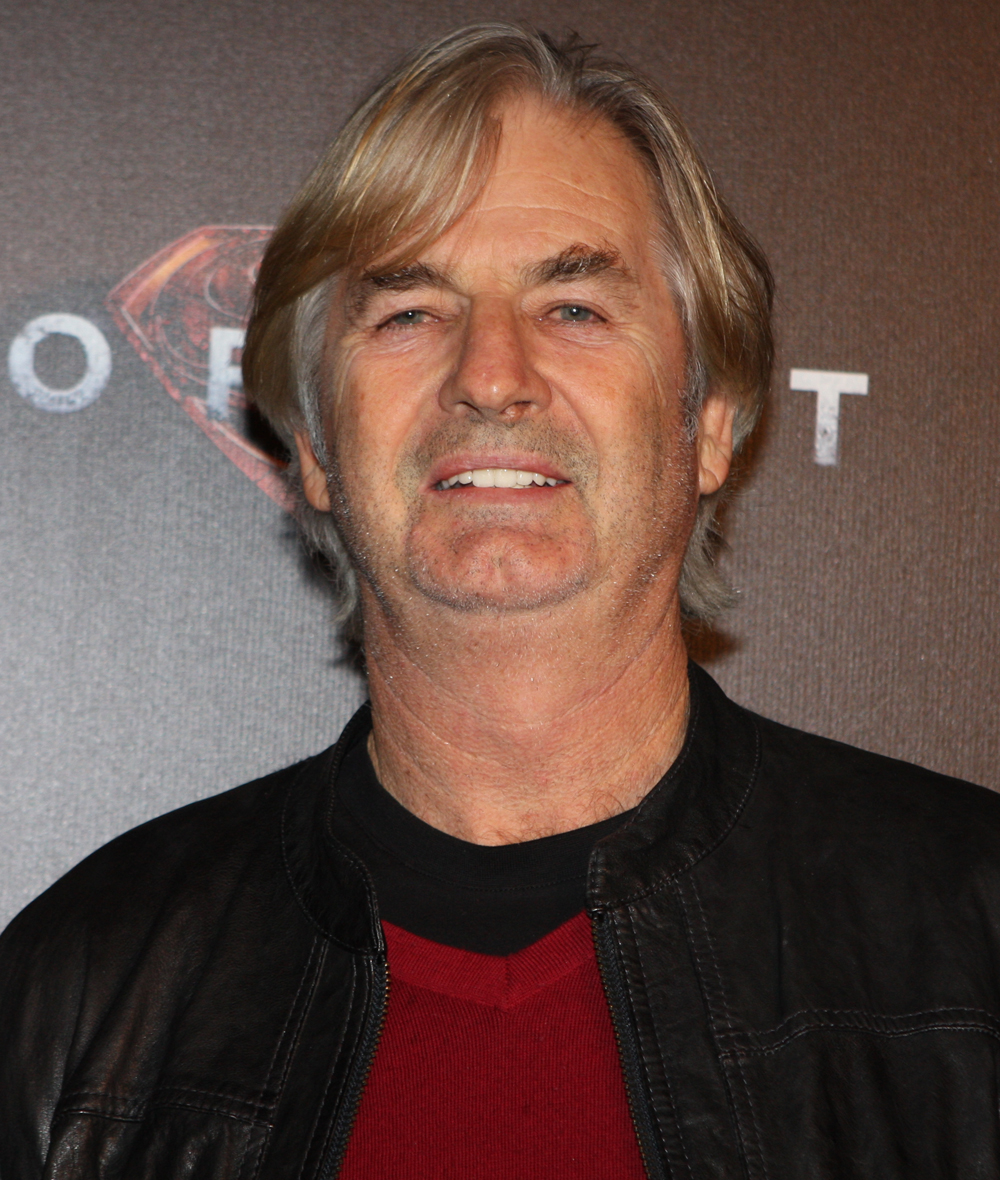
- Jarratt at the Sydney premiere of Man of Steel, 24 June 2013
- Born: 5 August 1952 (age 74); Wongawilli, New South Wales, Australia
- Occupations: Actor; film producer; film director; TV presenter
- Years active: 1975–present

John Jarratt (born 5 August 1952) is an Australian television film actor, producer and director and TV presenter who rose to fame through his work in the Australian New Wave. He has appeared in a number of film roles including Picnic at Hanging Rock (1975), Summer City (1977), The Odd Angry Shot (1979), We of the Never Never (1982), Next of Kin (1982), and Dark Age (1987). He portrayed the antagonist Mick Taylor in the Wolf Creek franchise. He voiced the protagonist's father, Jack Hunter, in an audio drama adaptation of The Phoenix Files. He is also known for his recurring role in the drama series McLeod's Daughters.

== Early life ==
Jarratt was born in what was then a small coal-mining village, now the Wollongong suburb of Wongawilli, New South Wales, where he would grow up, before the family later moved to the Snowy Mountains area. His father was a coal miner, and later a concreter working on the Snowy Mountains Scheme. Jarratt comes from a family of Irish Catholic descent; however, his patrilineal ancestor George Jarratt, born 1833, came from Croxton in Cambridgeshire, England. George's son John married Mary Kelly from Ireland. On the genealogy show Who Do You Think You Are?, Jarratt confirmed that his great-great-grandfather was Chinese. While in high school, Jarratt directed and acted in a school play which was a great success and led to his school principal recommending that he pursue an acting career.

== Career ==
=== Early work ===
Jarratt graduated from the National Institute of Dramatic Art (NIDA) in 1973. His screen debut was in The Great Macarthy (1975). He also appeared in Peter Weir's Picnic at Hanging Rock (1975) and Summer City (1977) with Mel Gibson. Jarratt had the lead role in the 1980 miniseries The Last Outlaw playing Ned Kelly. He played a major supporting role as a young Australian soldier in Vietnam War movie The Odd Angry Shot (1979) and We of the Never Never (1982). In the late 1980s, Jarratt recognised he had a problem with binge-drinking and related violence. He joined Alcoholics Anonymous (AA), an organisation in which he continues to be active.

=== Television ===
In the 1990s, Jarratt was a presenter on the lifestyle show Better Homes and Gardens with then-wife Noni Hazlehurst. He had guest roles in Inspector Morse, Police Rescue, Blue Murder, Water Rats and Blue Heelers in the 1990s and 2000s. He joined the cast of McLeod's Daughters in 2001, and left the show in 2006. In 2010, Jarratt appeared in a commercial for Husqvarna, where he proved the tools' efficiency by playing his character in Wolf Creek. In May 2013, Jarratt filmed a guest star role in the third instalment of the ABC telemovie series, Jack Irish: Dead Point. In 2016, the Wolf Creek web television series debuted on Stan. The series saw Jarratt reprise his role as Mick Taylor. A second series aired in 2017.

=== Return to cinema ===
In 2005, Jarratt had a major role in the Australian film Wolf Creek, playing the villain Mick Taylor. In 2007, he appeared in two films, Rogue and The Final Winter. Jarratt also had a small role in the 2008 film, Australia, as a soldier. In 2008, Jarratt launched his own film production company, Winnah Films. Winnah's first feature film, Savages Crossing (originally carrying the working title Flood) went into principal photography outside Ipswich, Queensland in February. In 2009, he appears as the father of a teenage girl via phone in Telstra's "Next G" commercials.

In 2010, Jarratt starred in the exploitation film, Bad Behaviour, written and directed by Joseph Sims. In the same year, Jarratt also had a role in the supernatural horror movie Needle. He made a cameo in Quentin Tarantino's Django Unchained in 2012, appearing as an employee of the Le Quint Dickie Mining Company alongside Tarantino himself, both appearing with Australian accents. In February 2013, Jarratt reprised his role as Mick Taylor, filming the Wolf Creek sequel, Wolf Creek 2, with Matt Hearn producing and Greg McLean directing. The film was released on 20 February 2014. In January 2014, Jarratt starred in and co-directed the romantic comedy thriller StalkHer; the film met with mixed reviews.

In April 2022, after a series of delays, some linked to the COVID-19 pandemic, another film, Wolf Creek 3, was in the development phase, specifically, location scouting. It is set to be directed by Rachele Wiggins and written by Duncan Samarasinghe with Greg McLean as producer. In 2021, Altitude Film Distribution was scheduled to distribute in the United Kingdom; however, this was abandoned. Jarratt will reprise his role as Taylor. The premise is "An American family takes a dream trip to the Australian outback and soon draws the attention of notorious serial killer Mick Taylor. A hellish nightmare ensues as the couple's two children escape only to be hunted by Australia's most infamous killer." In 2022, Wolf Creek 3 was set to be released, with the tagline "There Will be Blood". On 30 August 2024, it was announced a new reboot for the franchise will begin filming in early 2025 titled as Wolf Creek: Legacy with Jarratt set to return and reprise the role and Sean Lahiff as new director.

=== Other work ===
Jarratt returned to audio drama work, after working for the ABC in the 1970s to co-star in Benjamin Maio Mackay's adaptation of The Phoenix Files in 2017. The first two instalments were released across 2017 and 2018, but Jarratt is no longer listed as being involved with the project.

== Personal life ==
Jarratt has been married four times. First to Rosa Miano, then to actress Noni Hazlehurst, then Cody Jarrett, and again to Rosa Miano. His children with his second wife, Noni, are all named after characters Jarratt has portrayed in his films. On 1 October 2015, Jarratt released his autobiography, The Bastard from the Bush.

== Legal issues ==
In August 2007, Jarratt filed a lawsuit against the Seven Network over a story which ran on the current affairs show Today Tonight. He claimed the story defamed him. The story told of Jarratt in a dispute with his tenant and how he had made attempts to intimidate and evict the tenant. The story accused Jarratt of echoing his character Mick Taylor from the film Wolf Creek in his intimidation, described an answering machine message left by him to his tenant saying "I have always been a winner—a winner". A lawyer for Seven told the court that the story had not portrayed Jarratt as a "psychopathic killer". The case was adjourned until 12 October 2007.

On 25 August 2018, Jarratt was charged with rape after a woman came forward to report an alleged incident in 1976. Jarratt pleaded not guilty. After a five-day trial, he was found not guilty on 5 July 2019. After his acquittal, Jarratt launched a lawsuit against The Daily Telegraph over their reporting of his case. He dropped the case after a month, but then restarted it after the Telegraph posted an article saying that he "got away with rape". The suit was settled out of court on 22 December 2019, with the Telegraph posting an apology on its website.

== Filmography ==
=== Film ===
Year	Film	Role	Notes
1975	The Great Macarthy	Macarthy	Feature film
1975	Picnic at Hanging Rock	Albert Crundall	Feature film
1977	Summer City	Sandy	Feature film
1977	The Sound of Love	David	TV film
1978	Blue Fin	Sam Snell	Feature film
1978	Little Boy Lost	Vic Tanner	Feature film
1979	The Odd Angry Shot	Bill	Feature film
1982	We of the Never Never	Dandy	Feature film
1982	Next of Kin	Barney	Feature film
1982	Fluteman	Fluteman	Feature film
1984	The Settlement	Tommy Martin	Feature film
1984	Chase Through the Night	Clurry	TV movie
1985	The Naked Country	Mick Conrad	Feature film
1986	Australian Dream	Todd	Feature film
1987	Dark Age	Steve Harris	Feature film
1988	Top Enders	Jack	TV movie
1993	Joh's Jury	Kev	TV movie
1995	All Men Are Liars	Barry	Feature film
1996	Dead Heart	Charlie	Feature film
2005	Wolf Creek	Mick Taylor	Feature film
2007	Rogue	Russell	Feature film
2007	The Final Winter	Colgate	Feature film
2008	Australia	Sergeant	Feature film
2008	Not Quite Hollywood: The Wild, Untold Story of Ozploitation!	Himself	Documentary
2010	Needle	Paul the Coroner	Feature film
2010	Bad Behaviour	Ricky	Feature film
2011	Savages Crossing	Phil	Feature film
2012	Django Unchained	Le-Quint Dickey Mining Company Employee	Feature film
2012	Shiver	Franklin Rood	Feature film
2013	Wolf Creek 2	Mick Taylor	Feature film
2013	100 Bloody Acres	Burke	Feature film
2014	Jack Irish: Dead Point	Sen. Sgt Laurie Olsen	TV movie
2015	Frenzy	Benjiman Lightbriger	Feature film
2015	StalkHer	Jack	Feature film Also co-director Produced by OZPIX (Jarratt is a part-owner)
2015	Observance	Snitch	Feature film
2018	Boar	Ken	Feature film
2022	The Wild One	James Morrill	Release due July/August
2023	What about Sal	Tom O’Dwyer	Feature film
2026	Zombie Plane		Feature film
2026	Wolf Creek: Legacy	Mick Taylor	Feature film – filming

=== Television ===
Year	Film	Role	Notes
1976	The Outsiders	Bobby	TV series
1977	The Young Doctors	Ben Stone	TV series
1980	The Last Outlaw	Ned Kelly	Miniseries
1987	Fields of Fire	Jacko	Miniseries
1988	Fields of Fire II	Jacko	Miniseries
1988	Dusty		Miniseries
1989	Fields of Fire III	Jacko	Miniseries
1989	Tanamera – Lion of Singapore	Neil Forbes	Miniseries
1991	Inspector Morse	Sergeant Scott Humphries	Season 5, episode 5: "Promised Land"
1994	Under the Skin		Anthology series
1994	Blue Heelers	Charlie Glover	Season 1, episode 19: "Good Cop, Bad Cop"
1995	Police Rescue	Guest role	TV series
1995	Blue Murder	Guest role	TV series
1995–1998	Better Homes and Gardens	Presenter	TV series
2000	Water Rats	Guest role	TV series
2001–2006	McLeod's Daughters	Terry Dodge	Seasons 1–6 (recurring, 100 episodes)
2016–2017	Wolf Creek	Mick Taylor	Seasons 1–2 (main role, 12 episodes)
2020	Siren	Naval Guard	TV series
2022–present	Darby and Joan	Bill Carlton	TV series
2023	Faraway Downs	Sergeant	6 episodes
