= Mark Wales =

Australian author, entrepreneur and veteran (born 1979)

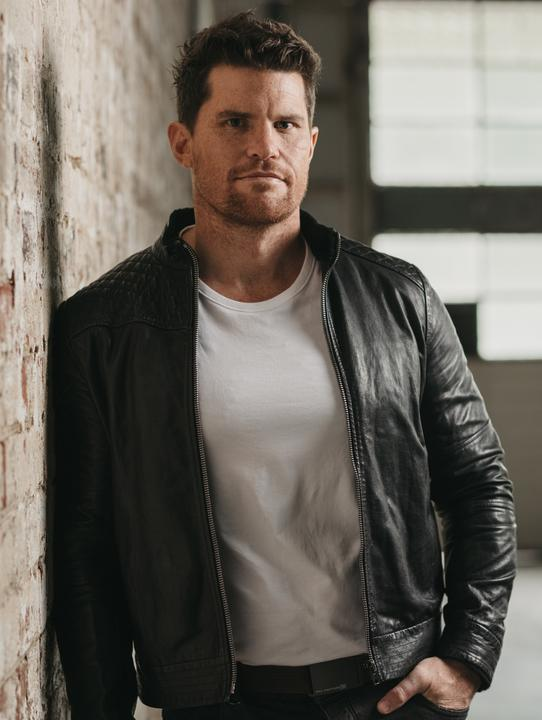
- Wales in 2020

Personal details
- Born: Mark Adam Wales; 3 November 1979 (age 46) Newman, Western Australia, Australia
- Spouse: Samantha Gash (m. 2019; sep. 2024)
- Children: 1
- Education: University of New South Wales; Royal Military College, Duntroon; Wharton School
- Website: https://www.markwales.com.au

Military service
- Allegiance: Australia
- Branch/service: Australian Army
- Years of service: 1996–2014
- Rank: Major
- Commands: Special Air Service Regiment
- Battles/wars: Operation Astute; War in Afghanistan; Iraq War

Mark Adam Wales (born 3 November 1979) is an Australian author and entrepreneur. He gained national attention as a competitor on Australian Survivor, which he eventually won. His earlier career had been as an officer in the Australian Army, where he made ten deployments over 16 years, including four to Afghanistan with the Special Air Service Regiment. On leaving the military he began business studies in the United States, before launching an apparel brand in New York. His 2021 memoir, also called Survivor, documented his experiences of war, PTSD and moral injury.

== Early life ==
=== Family background ===
Wales' parents met in the country town of Maffra in Victoria, where his mother was a secretary and his father a bank teller, before taking a job as truck driver in the remote iron ore community of Newman, Western Australia. Wales was born here, growing up with older brother Steve, younger brother Dan and very few rules, which were "no drugs, no motorbikes, and always do your best, always."

He has written about regional Australia in the 1980s as friendly, happily hitchhiking as a child with his older brother. Trips to visit his mother's family in Cookernup, in the state's south west, were frequent. However, it was here that he and his older brother were sexually abused by a family member on a dairy farm, where he was "utterly helpless against this guy because he was bigger, stronger, could do whatever he wanted." Wales has indicated that choosing a military career had been shaped by a desire "to be in control of my environment—never getting in that situation again." His grandfather on his father's side also influenced the young man, handing him a shin guntō captured from Japanese forces whilst he had fought the Battle of Morotai.

Job moves with Australian Customs took the family to Perth, then Geraldton, then back to Perth, with the family settling in Leeming, where Wales went to high school Wales recalls a moment at school where he decided his future: seeing the front cover of a classmate's magazine which showed black-clad troops storming the Iranian Embassy in London to rescue western hostages. He later said he found the idea of "saving people from hell" compelling. In June 1996, his final year of school, 18 Australian soldiers were killed in a tragic Black Hawk accident; though this seemed to increase his resolve.

== Military service ==
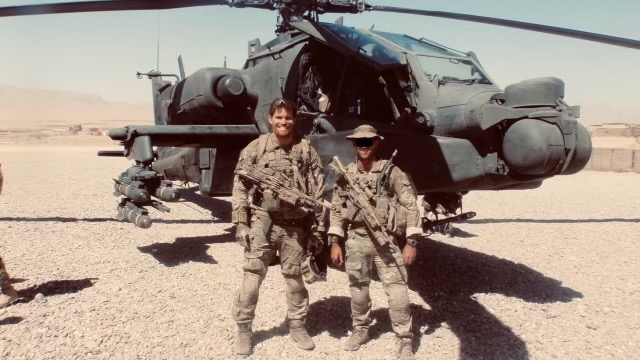
With a fellow SASR soldier before an AH-64 Apache helicopter, Afghanistan, 2010

According to his service memoir, Wales took the Oath of Allegiance at an Australian Defence Force ceremony at Swan Barracks in 1997, at age 17. Commissioned as an officer cadet, he moved to Canberra to study at Australian Defence Force Academy which he did not enjoy. He further admits, "I was a disaster as cadet." In one fire and maneuver exercise he led, most soldier cadets became lost. In his grenade training, the weapon was fumbled before exploding, though, remarkably, no one was hurt. Even so, he successfully completed his degree and went on to Royal Military College, Duntroon in 2000. Here, Wales was dressed down by an assessor officer for a catastrophic ambush exercise, along with the feedback that "To my absolute bloody amazement, they followed you. They wanted to work for you. That’s a good thing. You can lead, you have that skill – you just need more technical work." He would go on to active service, making ten deployments, including Timor-Leste, Solomon Islands, Iraq, Afghanistan, Fiji and Lebanon.

=== Royal Australian Regiment ===
Commissioned as a Lieutenant, Wales was appointed as commander of 5 Platoon in 2nd Battalion, Royal Australian Regiment, known as 2RAR, based in Townsville. Through 2001, he led the platoon on exercises at Line Creek Junction, before deploying to East Timor.

==== Timor Leste, 2001-2002 ====
Leading a infantry platoon of 30 soldiers, Wales served a 7 month tour in Timor Leste to protect locals from pro-Indonesia militias. These involved long patrols of up to nine-days without resupply; and securing Junction Point Alpha on the border with West Timor. Reporting to Angus Campbell allowed him to learn more about the SASR from a former Squadron commander. Only he heard the unit was, at that time, "a menagerie" and that warfare "brings nothing but misery. During Easter 2002, his platoon oversaw the repatriation of 3,000 East-Timorese from refugee camps, which, Wales later said, was the first time he had witnessed real human suffering.

==== Solomon Islands, 2003 ====
To support Operation Anode, Wales' 2RAR unit was sent to the Solomon Islands in to stabilise the country. This included missions on rigid inflatable boats close to where Australians fought in the Guadalcanal campaign of World War II. By the end of that year he was made a Captain, leading exercises for the 11th/28th Battalion, based in Perth.

=== SAS Regiment ===
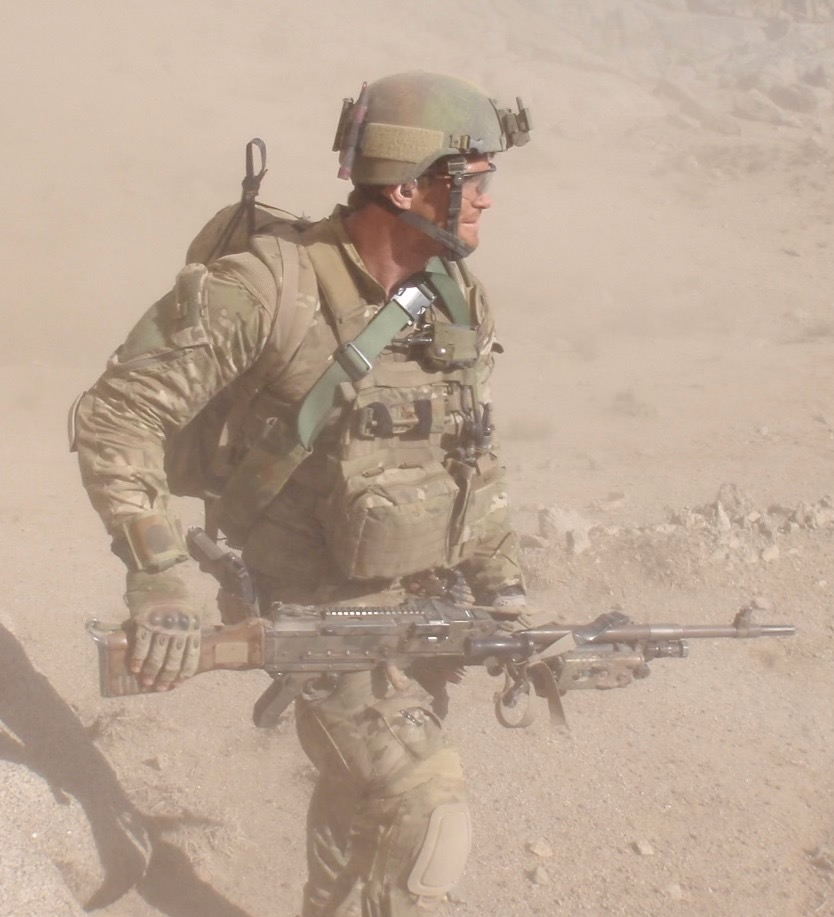
Wales in Tarin Kot, Afghanistan, October 2010

After Selection, Wales moved into special forces, where he would complete four tours of Afghanistan between 2007 and 2010.

==== Selection, 2004 ====
Wales was one of 83 candidates who underwent the 2004 Selection for the Special Air Service Regiment, completing the additional officers module after the first week. In interviews, Wales has said this included planning a hostage rescue operation, whilst being denied food and sleep, and a 130 kilometre navigation exercise, on foot, in which he became badly injured. Though he had concerns that his size would impede endurance (he is six foot three inches) he completed all modules and was accepted into the regiment and began the one-year reinforcement cycle in 2005.

==== Close protection, 2006 ====
Operational roles in special forces began when Wales started leading close protection teams in war zones. He led protective security detachments for visiting generals and political leaders, such as Lt Gen Peter Leahy, as they visited Baghdad, Basra, Talil, and Camp Victory in Iraq; and Kabul, Camp Russell, Kandahar, and Bagram in Afghanistan. Wales' squadron was called to provide protection to Xanana Gusmão during the 2006 East Timorese crisis, which extended to combat roles later in the year.

==== Timor-Leste, early 2007 ====
After providing security for world leaders at the 2007 Asia-Pacific Economic Cooperation, Wales was asked to return to Timor for a third tour, in the role of Operations Officer. At one point, this involved missions to locate and retrieve the fugitive rebel officer, Major Alfredo Reinado, who would die in early 2008.

==== Afghanistan, late 2007 ====
While in Timor, Wales was asked to help form a composite troop within Rotation V, deploying to Uruzgan Province in September 2007. E Troop would be Wales' first troop command; with the task of clearing the Chora Valley of insurgents.

On 24–25 October, he led his soldiers in a 12-hour firefight with Taliban fighters in a greenbelt of cornfield and its surrounding compounds. In the action he was supported by Australian snipers, AH-64 Apache attack helicopters of the British Army Air Corps, members of the 1st Gorkha Rifles and MQ-9 Reapers from the 432nd Wing of the U.S. Air Force; here Wales role meant directing fires, coordinating troops and coordinating medivac. The unharvested field enabled an ambush by the enemy and, very early in the action, Wales' sergeant, Matthew Locke was shot in the upper chest by a PK machine gun, and pronounced dead after extraction. In the reporting of the battle by Chris Masters the soldiers were said to have "fought like mongrel dogs." Wales was devastated by the death of his sergeant, giving himself tough criticism for being insufficiently aware of the dangers of the greenbelt.

On 1–5 December, Wales led the Australian force element in support of an attack on the enemy stronghold of Musa Qala in Helmand Province. Whilst cutting off Taliban reinforcements at Deh Rawood, an Australian long range vehicle became stuck in the Helmand River, with Taliban fighters approaching. Wales' unit soon came under mortar fire but the Taliban effort was repulsed by heavy weapons, artillery fire from a long range self propelled Panzerhaubitze howitzer and B-1 Lancer bombing runs, dropping 500 pound munitions. By the end of the tour, Wales had developed PTSD and depression.

==== Lebanon, 2008 ====
In what became known as the 7 May clashes, Hezbollah took over parts of Lebanon and was fighting with the Lebanese Army. Wales was given a task to enter the country within 24 hours, in a discreet reconnaissance mission, planning a possible national evacuation operation.

==== Afghanistan, 2009-2010 ====
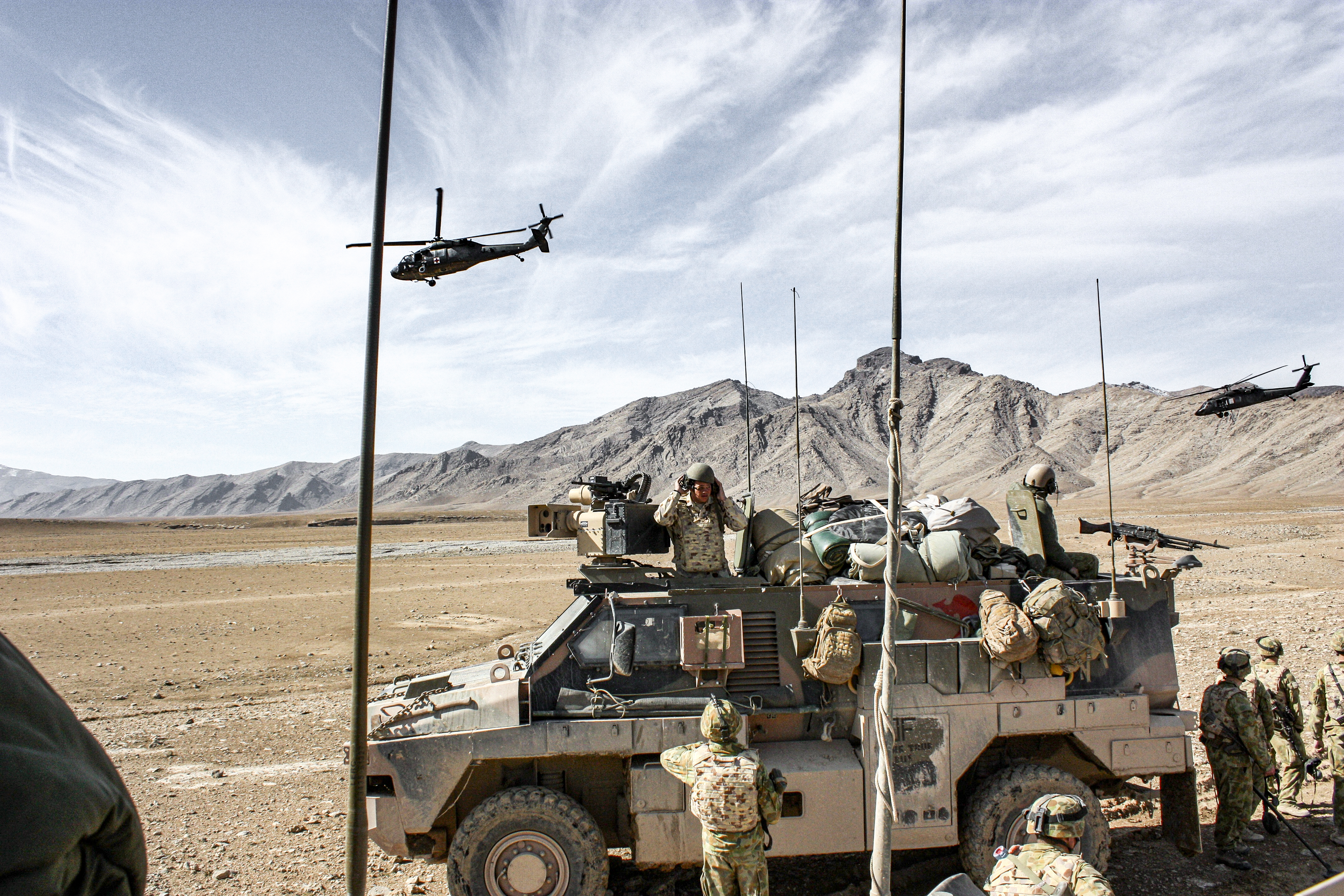
Australian forces in the Chora Valley, 2010

In 2009, while in a liaison role with Australian operators, Wales noticed "something here wasn't right" at the Australian base. Facilities had been greatly improved, but use of alcohol during the day was now open, and interest in violent combat had become "dark." He took on the role of Executive Officer of 1 Squadron, leading combat operations from Camp Russell, Tarin Kot, in the northern summer of 2010, during what became known as the troop surge. This involved planning operations, including air packages, the rotary wing, counter-insurgency and targeting force commanders.

By the end of 2010, Wales saw strategic, operational and moral problems in Operation Slipper. Strategically, he began seeing the conflict as an "aimless war" with no discernible objective. This gave the enemy an advantage that could not be overcome: "The arrogance you have as a Westerner with hardware, satellites etc. We think we can be beaten and it is such a shock to learn somebody incredibly motivated with a cheap weapon and a willingness to fight you at close range can nullify all those advantages." Operationally, Wales believed that, in contrast to American forces, Australian missions were poorly resourced. He has expressed "frustration that we're not, at the national level, understanding that."

Personally, Wales had begun drinking heavily, had difficulty sleeping and his "moral compass" was slipping. He found that his view of the Afghan people had changed. “I lost trust in the population. I was like, ‘you are all against us, until you prove otherwise’. I just assumed that anyone in the population could be out to kill us.” Surrounded by men who had done "six or seven tours with heavy combat" he came to the conclusion that "a war like that will turn good men bad, and bad men evil." Even so, the journalist Masters came to describe Wales as one a small number of SAS officers who was "admired for assured application of intelligence and integrity within an anarchic a sometimes soulless environment. When the Brereton Report found evidence of war crimes in the regiment, Wales expressed that he was shocked, but unsurprised, telling Neil Mitchell that a cohort of soldiers had been exposed to combat for too long, such that “your sense of what is normal gets warped".

==== Duntroon, 2011 ====
Now a Major, Wales returned to Australia, with some anxiety about the future. With the support of his former Commanding Officer, Peter Winnall, Wales took a teaching role at Duntroon in 2011. Outside of teaching hours, Wales began to look at ways to move into the business world, applying to American business schools and practicing the GMAT. After several attempts, he won a place at Wharton School in Pennsylvania, resigning his commission and leaving the army in 2012.

== Business and entertainment ==
Arriving at Wharton for the 2012 MBA program, Wales collaborated with other students, which included veterans from around the world, along with extracurricular—such as competing as a heavy weight boxer in the Philly Fight Night. On graduation Wharton selected Wales for the "40 under 40" list for business excellence.

=== McKinsey ===
After completing the MBA, Wales applied for a role with McKinsey & Company. He later learned he'd been successful because, in his interview, he made recommendations without hedging. Sent to Australia, his first project was with an iron ore business, based in Newman; and later went on to manage the McKinsey Academy program. However, he chose to move on from the company to concentrate on his own start up.

=== Kill Kapture ===
During his MBA, Wales had created a "tough luxury" fashion label, Kill Kapture, and he moved to New York City to work on the business full time. Beginning with leather jackets, he hoped the brand could be a way of telling the story of what he, and others, had been through. During business development, he was partly inspired by retired general Jim Mattis, who had come to visit students, "He told us the best thing we could do for the security of the country was to go out and start good businesses to make the economy stronger." Wales moved to New York City in 2017 to work on the business full time. The initial jacket, known as Pathfinder was made from kangaroo hide, said to be ten times stronger than cowhide. The shape was directly taken from contemporary special forces combat gear, which had become form-fitting. Wales aimed his product at a particular type of person, "someone who had taken a few knocks, stood firmly by their values and who should not be taken lightly." Sewed into the jacket was a tracking beacon that allows the jacket to be located should the item become lost. The initial modelling was done by General Mattis, and Wales himself.

=== Eco-challenge and Survivor ===
While in New York, where funds were running low, a friend recommended that Wales audition for the season 4 of Australian Survivor. One of 20,000 applicants to the Endemol production in 2017, Wales positioned himself as a 'special ops / fashion designer' and he was invited to screen test. Wales was chosen from this cohort and filming began on location in Samoa, in May of that year. The cast included the ultramarathon runner Samantha Gash, who formed a relationship with Wales during filming. This proved detrimental to both competitors—being voted out because of the romance—however, the relationship endured.

Wales found adventure entertainment suited him and took up the opportunity to compete in the World's Toughest Race: Eco-Challenge Fiji. Filmed in 2019 and premiered on Amazon Prime in August 2020, the 700 km course was said to be extremely demanding, where contestants experienced hypothermia in the highlands. Wales' team finished 26th out of field of 44.

Both Gash and Wales returned to Survivor for Australian Survivor: Blood V Water. In this 2022 production, based in Queensland, Wales defeated 23 competitors, including his now wife.

Shortly after Survivor, Wales auditioned for a character role in Furiosa: A Mad Max Saga, being cast as Hefty Brakeman and he was filmed on location in mid 2022. The film released in 2024.

== Writer ==
=== Survivor ===
In 2019, Macmillan Australia published Wales' memoir, also titled Survivor. His first non-fiction work, many parts were written in "a cold sweat" as they covered disturbing aspects of family life, and combat, which he later said, "unhinged me morally and mentally." At its mid-point, Wales becomes not only critical of himself, but of the leaders and policies who had sent him to war:

"...more people would die, more proclamations about ‘difficult, fragile’ progress would be made. Meanwhile the moral injuries piled up behind the casualty lists – especially in special forces. We were being flogged with operational tempo, which we loved, at least initially... But the cost was high. Death, injury and burnout was boiling to the surface. I had seen all three of them as far back as 2007.

The memoir was endorsed by Bear Grylls, receiving positive reviews from the Australian military community, describing it as "inspirational" and an "epic story of survival" and was listed for the Margaret and Colin Roderick Literary Award for 2022. It is the first memoir published after the Brereton Report, and seems to have emboldened Wales to write further contributions about the war in Afghanistan, including an op-ed with the Sydney Morning Herald titled "SAS war crimes: 'killing became incentivised, a toxic culture grew.'" Wales' first novel is slated to be published in 2024. It is said to depict a fictional Australian conflict, where a coup is triggered by the influence of the CCP.

=== Outrider ===
Wales released his first fictional work in 2024. Outrider is set in the near future, where China has destroyed three US Naval carrier groups and the entire Royal Australian Navy in three battles, before fomenting a civil war in mainland Australia. In the occupied territory near Melbourne, the protagonist Jack Dunne begins an insurrection against PLA-aligned forces, while trying to protect his 11-year-old boy.

The international editor of The Sydney Morning Herald, Peter Hartcher, said the scenario behind the book's "gritty action" drew on geopolitical realism. Further, he suggested the civic insurrection of "plucky resistance warriors fighting traitorous Aussies who side with the occupiers" was quite possible, given Australia's fractious conflicts during Covid-19.

The Australian reviewed the novel as "explosive", describing Jack Dunne as "the next Scarecrow"; the protagonist of thrillers by Matthew Reilly. Books+Publishing described Wales' book as a "fast-paced, high-octane thriller", comparing it favourably to works by novelists Lee Child and Chris Ryan.

== Personal life ==
Wales separated from Samantha Gash in 2024. In 2025, he was reported to be in a new relationship with Phoebe Timmins. He has a son from a previous relationship with Samantha Gash, named Harry Locke Wales.

Wales was selected as the Liberal Party candidate for the federal seat of Tangney in April 2024. He won a majority of votes among pre-selectors from a field of six. However, with a close family member experiencing a life-threatening health episode, he withdrew from the competition, in order to "provide all the support they need."

While staying silent for many years on his experience of childhood abuse, becoming a father prompted Wales to report the matter to Western Australian Police in 2019. The abuser, who was later convicted, was his mother's cousin, Richard Ernest Jackson.

== Bibliography ==
- Wales, Mark (25 May 2021). Survivor: Life in the SAS. Sydney: Macmillan. ISBN 978-1760982751.
- Wales, Mark (25 June 2024). Outrider. Sydney: Macmillan. ISBN 9781761264962.
