= World's Toughest Race: Eco-Challenge Fiji =

- Genre: Documentary; adventure; reality competition
- Directed by: David Charles
- Presented by: Bear Grylls
- Original language: English
- No. of episodes: 10

Production
- Producers: Mark Burnett; Eric Van Wagenen; Lisa Hennessy; Barry Poznick; Bear Grylls; Delbert Shoopman
- Production companies: MGM Television; Amazon Studios

Original release
- Network: Amazon Prime Video
- Release: August 14, 2020

World’s Toughest Race: Eco-Challenge Fiji is a television series documenting a long-range multi-day expedition race in which teams race non-stop with little to no sleep over mountains, jungles, and oceans. The series is a revival of the Eco-Challenge series first broadcast from 1995 to 2002. The race took place in Fiji in September 2019, and the television series documenting the race hosted by Bear Grylls premiered on Amazon Prime Video on August 14, 2020.

The race was contested by 66 teams of four from around the world. The race encompassed trekking by foot and traveling in various non-motorized forms of transportation, including paddling and sailing in an outrigger, paddleboarding, mountain biking, and whitewater rafting, requiring skills such as rappelling, climbing, and canyoneering. No modern technology can be used in navigation, and only a map and compass were provided. Expedition problem-solving skills were required to meet any challenges the teams may encounter along the way. All members of a team must complete the race; should any team member quit or cannot complete the race, the entire team would be eliminated.

The race was won by Team New Zealand, who also won the previous race held 17 years prior. The winning team received a $100,000 cash prize.

== Race course and overview ==
The race course covered more than 671 kilometres (417 miles) to be completed within eleven days with 66 teams from 30 countries participating in the race. There were 31 checkpoints along the way split into 5 legs. Each of the first 4 legs finished at a camp where the team must rest for a mandatory 90 minutes. Teams must recover a medallion in each leg, and they must also finish each leg within a specified cut-off time or they will be eliminated. The five stages of the race course were:

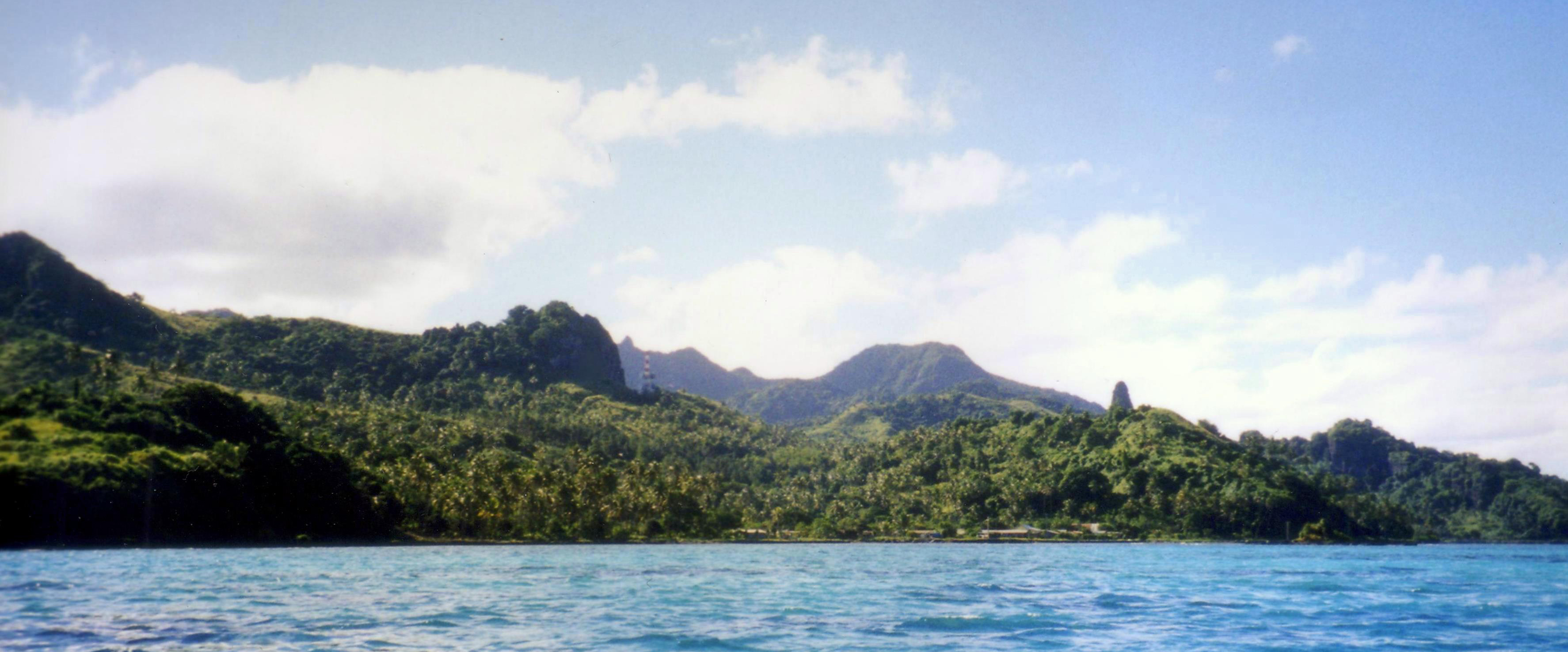
Ovalau Island

1. Ocean leg – From the starting point at the Draubuta Village on the main island of Viti Levu, teams moved down the Wainibokasi River on a camakau outrigger, and paddled or sailed over the sea for 65 km (40 mi). They reached the first checkpoint on the island of Leleuvia, then moved on to Ovalau, where they looped around the interior of the island for 20 km (12 mi) by foot before paddling back to the main island, along the way a team member had to dive down to the sea floor to retrieve a medallion. They moved up the Waidalici River in Verata for 30 km on a stand-up paddleboard, before traveling on mountain bike for a 56 km (35 mi) ride to Camp 1 at Naivucini Village, the end of the leg. Teams must reach the camp at 4pm on the third day.
2. Jungle leg – This leg covered almost 100 km (62 mi) in three sections. First the teams traveled 12 km (7 mi) through the Waiga Canyon where they may collect a medallion, then they paddled down 45 km (28 mi) the Wainimala River on a self-made bamboo bilibili raft. In the last section the teams traveled on mountain bikes for 40 km (25 mi) to Camp 2. They must reach Camp 2 at Waivaka village on day 5.
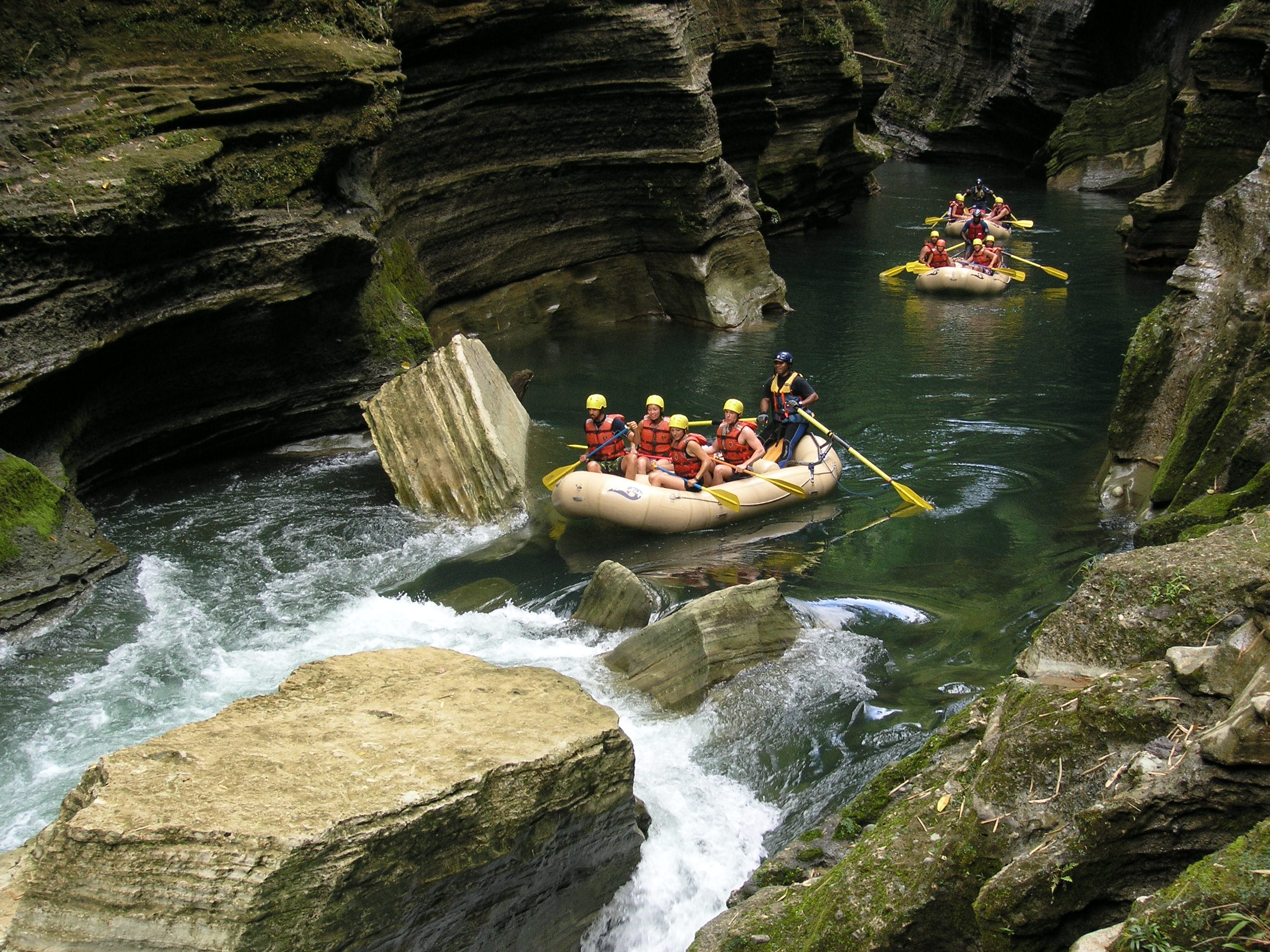
  Rafting on Navua River
3. River leg – This leg started with 63 km (39 mi) of biking, followed by 30 km (19 mi) of white water rafting on the Navua River, ending with 50 km (31 mi) of jungle trekking. For safety reasons, no team can tackle white water rafting during the night, and teams must stay at the check point until dawn before they can proceed to the river to raft. They can collect a medallion from the chief of Namuamua Village after the rafting section. For the jungle-hiking, teams may enlist help from the locals as guides or porters. This leg ended at Camp 3 at Lutu Village.
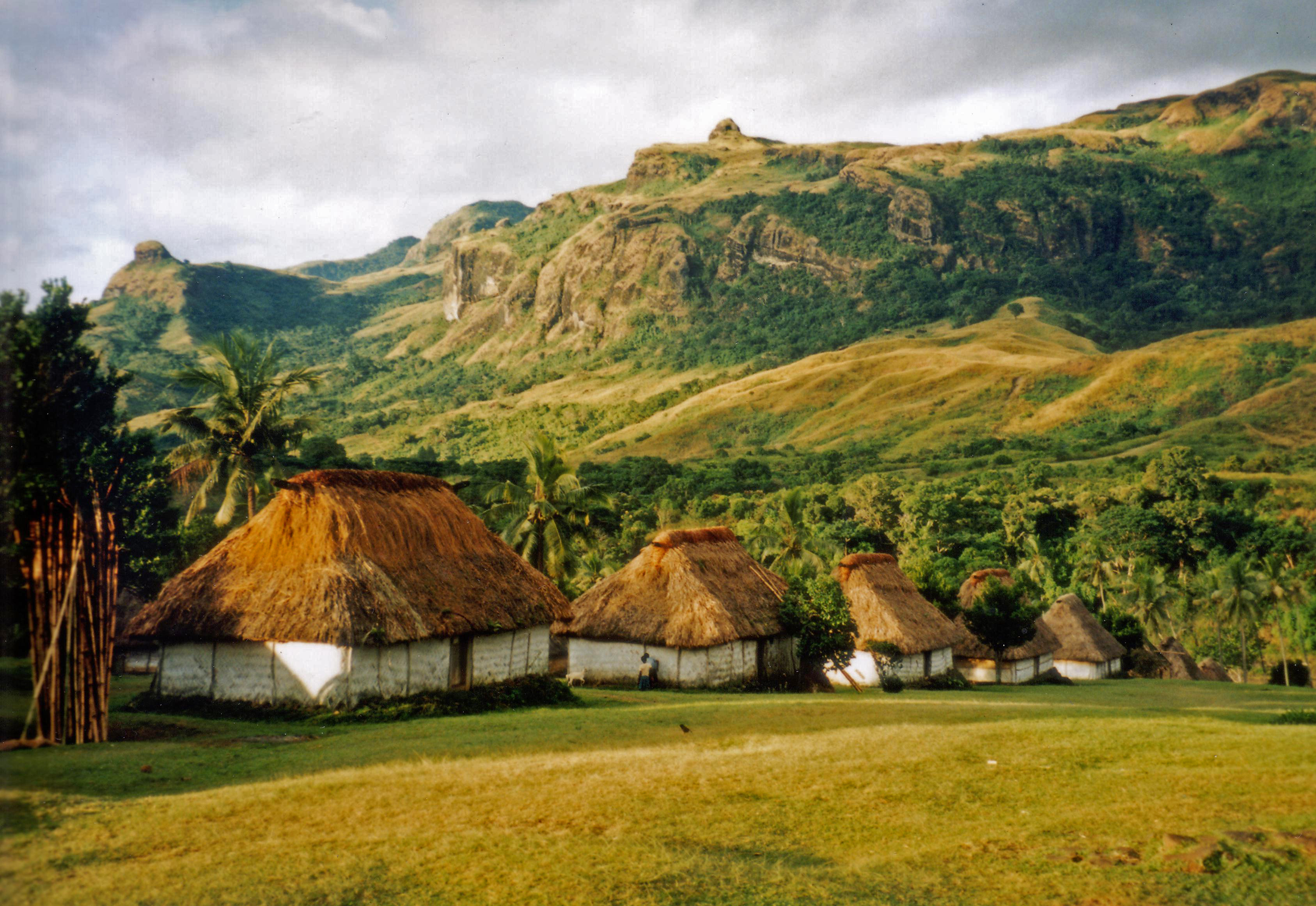
  Navala village, the camp for the Highland leg
4. Highland leg – The teams first trekked through the jungle to the base of Vuwa Falls, and climbed 1,000 feet (300m) up the falls to collect a medallion. They then swam for 9 kilometres (6 mi) in a series of cold pools above the fall. This was followed by a paddleboarding section for 16 km (10 mi) in over Monasavu lake before they trekked for 50 km (31 mi) in the highland to reach the fourth and last camp at Navala Village.
5. Island leg – The last leg started with a 77 km (48 mi) mountain bike ride, during which the teams needed to a rappel 60 m (197 ft) down the Qalivuda Falls where they picked up their last medallion. After mountain biking, they transitioned to a stand-up paddleboard 12 km (7 mi) down the Sabeto River to reach the ocean. From the Lomolomo Beach they changed to an outrigger for a 45 km (28 mi) journey to their finishing line on Mana Island.

An early lead was taken by Team Bend Racing, but one member of the team suffered from heat exhaustion and the team dropped to the back of the pack to allow him to recover. Team New Zealand, consisting of team captain Nathan Fa’avae, Sophie Hart, Stuart Lynch, Chris Forne and Mark Rayward, then dominated the entire course. Other early leaders included Team Out There, Team France Expenature, Team Summit, Team Canada Adventure, Team Estonian Ace, Team Thunderbolt, and Team Tiki Tour, but along the way, navigational errors caused some of them to fall behind. The racers faced unexpected obstacles along the way, and heavy tropical storm forced the temporary suspension of the race for eight hours when water level rose to dangerous level in the canyon, although Team Estonian Ace was already trapped in the canyon. Parts of the course proved challenging for many teams and some, such as Team Summit, suffered from hypothermia after being immersed in the cold water for a long period in the mountain water. A number of teams were eliminated after failing to reach the camp before the cut-off time at each stage, the first to be eliminated this way was Team Unbroken. Others dropped out due to injury such as Team Onyx and Team Curl, or through illness caused by infections, while some dropped out through exhaustion due to the difficulty of the course.

The closing stages were contested between Team New Zealand, Team Canada Adventure and Team Gippsland Adventure from Australia. Although at some checkpoints the time differences between the leading and chasing teams were only minutes, Team New Zealand held on to their leading position throughout. Team New Zealand suffered a capsize of their outrigger requiring rescue in the last leg of the race; the organizers allowed them to continue the race after ferrying them to a nearby island and provided them with a new canoe. They managed to finish first, beating off challenges from the other two teams by over one-and-a-half hours.

== Episodes ==
No. in series	Title	Original release date
1	"3, 2, 1… Go!"	14 August 2020
2	"We Can’t Go Back, And We Can’t Go Forward"	14 August 2020
3	"This Race Is Back On"	14 August 2020
4	"Game On"	14 August 2020
5	"First They Have To Catch Us, Then They Have to Pass Us"	14 August 2020
6	"To Stop Is To Die"	14 August 2020
7	"I’ve Been Waiting To Do This The Whole Race"	14 August 2020
8	"The Only Sane Ones Are The Crazy Ones"	14 August 2020
9	"If We Don’t Move Fast, We’re Doomed"	14 August 2020
10	"Go, Fiji Go!"	14 August 2020

== Teams ==
Each race team is composed of four competitors led by a team captain (TC), including at least one member of the opposite sex, with one additional team assistant crew member (TAC) who help their team when they reach the camp. Each team races under a single country's flag. All teams must pass assessment tests on the various physical skills required on the course, and team members are required to work together under extreme stress and fatigue to finish the race. Listed below are the 66 competing teams:

=== Argentina ===
1. Team Outlab Argentina : Alejandro Eugenio Kuryluk (TC), Ignacio Raigoso, Silvina Bedecarras, Leonardo Yozzi, Fabian Cordiviola (TAC)
2. Team Tierra Viva : Guri Aznarez (TC), Veronica Astete, Juan Diego Lotz, Soledad Ermosilla, Dr. Marcelo Parada (TAC)

=== Australia ===
1. Team 2nd Chance : Deanna Blegg (TC), Maria Plyashechko, Sergey Kurov, Darren Clarke, Gavin Allen (TAC)
2. Team Aussie Rescue : Samantha Gash (TC), Morgan Coull, Mark Wales, Jarrod Mitchell, Joshua Lynott (TAC)
3. Team Gippsland Adventure : Rob Preston (TC), Kathryn Preston, Tim Boote, Aaron Prince, Patrick Howlett (TAC)
4. Team Mad Mayrs : Tyson Mayr (TC), Elijah Mayr, Nick Mayr, Courtney Home, Chris Dixon (TAC)
5. Team Scouts Australia : Myall Quint (TC), Marni Williams, Bernard Cronan, Benjamin (Ben) Warner, Brett Johnson (TAC)
6. Team Thunderbolt AR : Dave Schloss (TC), Bernadette Dornom, Elizabeth Dornom, Leo Theoharis, Jan Leverton (TAC)

=== Belgium ===
1. Team To-Get-Ther : Ludo Kaethoven (TC), Debby Urkens, Katrien Aerts, Jurgen Frtizz De Grauwe, Roger Urkens (TAC)

=== Brazil ===
1. Team Atenah Brasil : Shubi-Silvia Guimares (TC), Karina Bacha Lefevre, Nora Audre, Jose Caputo, Jose Pupo (TAC)
2. Team Vidaraid Adventure : Marco Amselem Rossini (TC), Urtzi Iglesias, Guilherme Pahl, Camila Nicolau, Aritz Bilbao Guerrero (TAC)

=== Canada ===
1. Team Atlas : Alexandre Provost (TC), Karine Corbell, Lars Bukkehave, Mark Sky, Tessa Jennison (TAC)
2. Team Canada Adventure : Bob Miller (TC), Ryan Atkins, Scott Ford, Rea Kolbl, Wayne Leek (TAC)
3. Team Peak Pursuit : Benjamin Kwiatkowski (TC), Thomas Hardy, Elora Van Jarrett, Jasper Edge, Laure Lejeune (TAC)
4. Team True North : Alex Mann (TC), Rebecca Mann, Philip Roadley, Logan Roadley, Jason Gillespie (TAC)

=== Colombia ===
1. Team Colombia : Jorge Diego Llano (TC), Jenny Sanin, Felix Vargas, Xavi Rodriguez Verdes, Jaroslav Najman (TAC)

=== Costa Rica ===
1. Team Costa Rica : Eduardo Baldioceda (TC), Sergio Sanchez, Gerhard Linner, Veronica Bravo, Eric Cano (TAC)

=== Czech Republic ===
1. Team Czech : Jan Cisar (TC), Pavel Paloncy, Tereza Rudolfova, Jan Obuskevic, Libor Kriz (TAC)

=== Ecuador ===
1. Team Epic Ecuador : Amber Laree de Freire (TC), Oswaldo (Ossy) Freire, Diana Artete, Pablo Sandoval, Paul Guerra (TAC)

=== Estonia ===
1. Team Estonian ACE : Silver Eensaar (TC), Timmo Tammemae, Reeda Tuula-Fjodorov, Rain Eensaar, Arthur Raichmann (TAC)

=== Fiji ===
1. Team Namako : Alivate Logavatu (TC), Petero Manoa, Eroni Takape, Kim Beckinsale, Courtney Nicole Kruse (TAC)
2. Team Tabu Soro : Uri Kurop (TC), Adam Wade, William Simpson, Anna Cowley, Semiti Tuitoga (TAC)

=== France ===
1. Team France Expenature : Romy “Romulad” Viale (TC), Daphne Derouch, Calais Jean Baptiste, Benjamin Midena, Philippe Marchegay (TAC)

=== Guatemala ===
1. Team Hombres D’Maiz : Netzer Quan (TC), Andres Duarte, Gabriela Molina, Sebastian Lancho, Leopoldo Bolanos (TAC)

=== India ===
1. Team Khukuri Warriors : Tashi Malik (TC), Nungshi Malik, Brandon Fisher, Praveen Singh Rangar, Col VS Malik (TAC)

=== Ireland ===
1. Team Ireland AR : Rob Heffernan (TC), Jason Black, Mark Lattanzi, Rachel Nolan, Ivan Park (TAC)

=== Israel ===
1. Team Israel : Elad Benjamin (TC), Daniel Keren, Ben Enosh, Linur Krigel Tsarfati, Amit Weiner (TAC)

=== Italy ===
1. Team Freemind Italia : Marco Ponteri (TC), Clelia Ponteri, Beppe Scotti, Telemaco Murgia, Tiziano Murgia (TAC)

=== Japan ===
1. Team East Wind : Masato Tanaka (TC), Machiko Nishii, Koki Yasuda, Akira Yonemoto, Masayuki Takahata (TAC)

=== Mexico ===
1. Team Teenek Mexico : Jorge Mendiola (TC), Ulises Gonzalez, Tomas Perez, Kathryn Morland, Fransico Mendiola (TAC)
2. Team Tollocan Mexico : Alejandro Carretero (TC), Yara Borbon, Fernando Villicana, Jorge Pavon, Adolfo Vela (TAC)

=== Netherlands ===
1. Team Checkpoint Hunters : Tom Oude Nijhuis (TC), Nienke Veenman, Wouter Neven, Rene Wolkorte, Tim Teutelink (TAC)

=== New Zealand ===
1. Team New Zealand : Nathan Fa’avae (TC), Sophie Hart, Stuart Lynch, Chris Forne, Mark Rayward (TAC)
2. Team Tiki Tour : Tom Lucas (TC), Micheal Kelly, Joanna Williams, George Lucas, Jeremy Warnock (TAC)

=== Russia ===
1. Team Science Winning : Eduard Khalilov (TC), Evgeniya Khalilov, Viktor Sherstiuk, Valeriy Cherkasov, Vyacheslav Obraztsov (TAC)

=== Spain ===
1. Team Meridianoraid Spain : Antonio de la Rosa Suarez (TC), Jesus Bermejo, Pablo Samper, Lucia Funes Mendez, Luis Cabrera (TAC)
2. Team Summit : Emma Roca (TC), Jukka Pinola, Fran Lopez Costoya, Albert Roca Velazquez, David Rovira Roqueta (TAC)

=== South Africa ===
1. Team Cyanosis : Clinton Mackintosh (TC), Nicholas Mulder, Sarah Fairmaid Clarke, Darren Barry, Steven Burnett (TAC)

=== Sweden ===
1. Team Swedeforce : John Karlsson (TC), Malin Hjalmarsson, Emil Dahlqvist, Oskar Svärd, Johan Lilja (TAC)

=== Turkey ===
1. Team Turk : Serdar KIlic (TC), Kenan Saran, Mike Saran, Eliska Hudcova, Andac Guven (TAC)

=== United Arab Emirates ===
1. Team Eco DXB : Emma Taylor (TC), Khalifa Algharfi, Ali Monguno, Ivana Kolaric, Peter Langley (TAC)

=== United Kingdom ===
1. Team UK Adventurers : Kevin Stephens (TC), Joseph Selby, Nathalie Long, Tim Stephens, Gill Watson (TAC)

=== United States ===
1. Team Able Abels : Dan Abel (TC), Ashley Abel, Lauren Abel, Fletcher Hammel, Allison Abel (TAC)
2. Team AR Georgia : Thomas Ambrose (TC), Katie Ferrington, Jeff Leininger, Hunter Leininger, Jeni Mcneal (TAC)
3. Team Bend Racing : Jason Magness (TC), Melissa Coombes, Stephen Thomas, Daniel Staudigel, Darren Steinbach (TAC)
4. Team Bones Adventure : Roy Malone (TC), Mari Chandlar, Charles Triponez, Jen Segger, David Egbert (TAC)
5. Team Canyoneros : HIen Nguyen (TC), Greg Watson, Nathan Whitaker, Lena Mcknight, Steven Geer (TAC)
6. Team Checkpoint Zero : Shane Hagerman (TC), Christopher Von Ins, Peter Jolles, Michele Hobson, Micheal Seroczynski (TAC)
7. Team Curl : Jennifer Hemmen (TC), Justin Smith, Brett Gravlin, Steven Lenhart, Jeff Failers (TAC)
8. Team Eagle Scouts : Eric Lillistorm (TC), Matthew Moniz, Katie Hancock, Corey Mullins, Charley Walton (TAC)
9. Team Endure : Travis Macy (TC), Mark Macy, Danelle Ballengee, Shane Sigle, Andrew Speers (TAC)
10. Team Flying J : Dianette Wells (TC), Guy LaRocque, Harald Zundel, Blain Reeves, Brian Johnson (TAC)
11. Team Iron Cowboy : Sonja Wieck (TC), James Lawrence, Shaun Christian, Aaron Hopkinson, Joe Morton (TAC)
12. Team Nika : Jeffery Bates (TC), Kara Haun, Ashley Andrews, John Bender, Keria Galan (TAC)
13. Team Onyx : Clifton Lyles (TC), Corree Aussem-Woltering, Samantha Scipio, Chirss Smith, Mikayla Lyless (TAC)
14. Team Out There : Mike Kloser (TC), Josiah Middaugh, Gretchen Reeves, Gordon Townsend, Neil Jones (TAC)
15. Team Peak Traverse : Ryan Opray (TC), Tim Cannard, Mikayla Wingle, Daniel Bussius, Stephen Morrow (TAC)
16. Team Regulators : Steven Bell (TC), Joshua Watkins, Heather Gustafson, Crista Jorgensen, Jason Hull (TAC)
17. Team Stray Dogs : Marshall Ulrich (TC), Adrian Crane, Bob Haugh, Nancy Bristow, Heather Ulrich (TAC)
18. Team Strong Machine: Cliff White (TC), Kate White, Starker White, Michael Garrison, John McInnes (TAC)
19. Team Sundance Kids : Chase McMillian (TC), Scott Ward, Sylvia Greer, Aaron Smith, Jason Serman (TAC)
20. Team Super Fighters : Heather Flebb (TC), Cary Flebbe, Sean Martin, Micheal Nicolaides, Danny Trudeau (TAC)
21. Team Unbroken : Hal Riley (TC), Gretchen Evans, Dr. Anne Bailey, Keith Mitchell Knoop, Cale Yarborough (TAC)
22. Team US Military : Joshua Forester (TC), Caitlin Thorn, Jesse Tubb, Jesse Spangler, Kevin Howser (TAC)

=== Uruguay ===
1. Team Chips Adventure : Nicolas Davyt (TC), Luis Enrique Gomez, David Vega, Alejandra Isabella, Ernesto Parra (TAC)
2. Team Uruguay Natural : Ruben Mandure (TC), Fredrica Frontini, Gonzalo Smaldone, Thiago Bonini, Laura Moratorio (TAC)

== Final standings ==
Rank	Team name	Country	Time taken to finish	Course completion status
1	Team New Zealand	New Zealand	141 hours 23 minutes	Completed
2	Team Canada Adventure	Canada	143 hours 00 minutes	Completed
3	Team Gippsland Adventure	Australia	143 hours 31 minutes	Completed
4	Team Tiki Tour	New Zealand	151 hours 59 minutes	Completed
5	Team Vidaraid Adventure	Brazil	154 hours 18 minutes	Completed
6	Team France Expenature	France	155 hours 12 minutes	Completed
7	Team Thunderbolt AR	Australia	157 hours 00 minutes	Completed
8	Team Swedeforce	Sweden	162 hours 09 minutes	Completed
9	Team Czech	Czech Republic	163 hours 40 minutes	Completed
10	Team Summit	Spain	164 hours 34 minutes	Completed
11	Team Estonian ACE	Estonia	166 hours 40 minutes	Completed
12	Team Cyanosis	South Africa	176 hours 20 minutes	Completed
13	Team Atlas	Canada	177 hours 42 minutes	Completed
14	Team Bend Racing	United States of America	181 hours 51 minutes	Completed
15	Team Bones Adventure	United States of America	183 hours 21 minutes	Completed
16	Team Uruguay Natural	Uruguay	185 hours 54 minutes	Completed
17	Team Out There	United States of America	196 hours 54 minutes	Completed
18	Team 2nd Chance	Australia	200 hours 31 minutes	Completed
19	Team Colombia	Colombia	201 hours 43 minutes	Completed
20	Team Checkpoint Zero	United States of America	201 hours 45 minutes	Completed
21	Team Costa Rica	Costa Rica	206 hours 13 minutes	Completed
22	Team UK Adventurers	United Kingdom	208 hours 24 minutes	Completed
23	Team Scouts Australia	Australia	210 hours 20 minutes	Completed
24	Team Teenek Mexico	Mexico	211 hours 00 minutes	Completed
25	Team Hombres D’Maiz	Guatemala	211 hours 26 minutes	Completed
26	Team Aussie Rescue	Australia	212 hours 28 minutes	Completed
27	Team Meridianoraid Spain	Spain	225 hours 23 minutes	Completed
28	Team Tierra Viva	Argentina	230 hours 46 minutes	Completed
29	Team US Military	United States of America	231 hours 48 minutes	Completed
30	Team AR Georgia	United States of America	233 hours 25 minutes	Completed
31	Team To-Get-Ther	Belgium	234 hours 41 minutes	Completed
32	Team Peak Pursuit	Canada	237 hours 46 minutes	Completed
33	Team Sundance Kids	United States of America	238 hours 07 minutes	Completed
34	Team Iron Cowboy	United States of America	241 hours 03 minutes	Completed
35	Team Checkpoint Hunters	Netherlands	243 hours 19 minutes	Completed
36	Team Khukuri Warriors	India	249 hours 00 minutes	Completed
37	Team Super Fighters	United States of America	250 hours 22 minutes	Completed
38	Team Mad Mayrs	Australia	251 hours 05 minutes	Completed
39	Team Regulators	United States of America	263 hours 51 minutes	Completed
40	Team True North	Canada	264 hours 15 minutes	Completed
41	Team Namako	Fiji	264 hours 46 minutes	Completed
41	Team Tabu Soro	Fiji	264 hours 46 minutes	Completed
43	Team Eagle Scouts	United States of America	266 hours 47 minutes	Completed
44	Team Canyoneros	United States of America	268 hours 35 minutes	Completed

=== Teams that did not finish ===
The following 22 teams failed to finish for a variety of reasons:

- Team Able Abels (USA)
- Team Ireland AR (Ireland)
- Team Israel (Israel)
- Team Freemind Italia (Italy)
- Team East Wind (Japan)
- Team Tollocan Mexico (Mexico)
- Team Atenah Brasil (Brazil)
- Team Outlab Argentina (Argentina)
- Team Curl (USA)
- Team Endure (USA)
- Team Flying J (USA)
- Team Nika (USA)
- Team Onyx (USA)
- Team Eco DXB (UAE)
- Team Ecuador (Ecuador)
- Team Science Winning (Russia)
- Team Turk (Turkey)
- Team Chips Adventure (Uruguay)
- Team Peak Traverse (USA)
- Team Stray Dogs (USA)
- Team Strong Machine (USA)
- Team Unbroken (USA)
