= Australian Survivor: Blood V Water =

Australian reality show

- Season 9
- Presented by: Jonathan LaPaglia
- No. of days: 47
- No. of castaways: 24
- Winner: Mark Wales
- Runners-up: Shay Lajoie; Chrissy Zaremba
- Location: Charters Towers, Queensland
- No. of episodes: 24

Release
- Original network: Network 10
- Original release: 31 January – 4 April 2022

Additional information
- Filming dates: 5 October – 20 November 2021

Season chronology
- ← Previous; Brains V Brawn Next → Heroes V Villains

Australian Survivor: Blood V Water is the ninth season of Australian Survivor, which premiered on Network 10 on 31 January 2022 and is based on the international reality competition franchise Survivor. In this season, based on the twenty-seventh and twenty-ninth American series and carrying the same sub-title, new and returning players and their loved ones will be competing against each other.

The season was filmed in Charters Towers, Queensland, and it will be the third season filmed in Australia, second consecutively due to the COVID-19 pandemic's impact of Australian borders which have been closed since March 2020.

The show concluded on 4 April 2022 with Mark Wales being named Sole Survivor, defeating Shay Lajoie and Chrissy Zaremba, receiving a unanimous jury vote of 10-0-0.

== Contestants ==
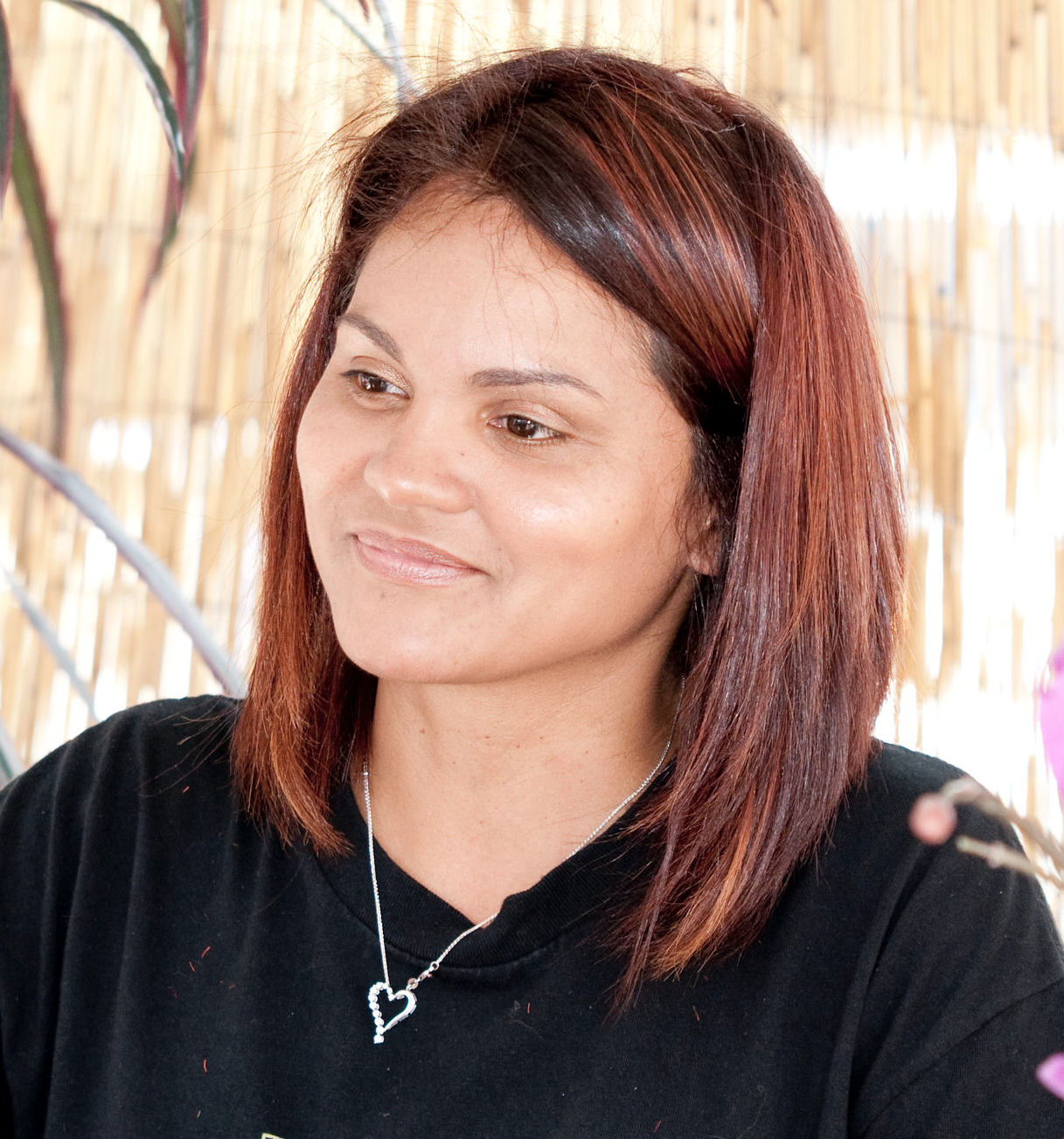
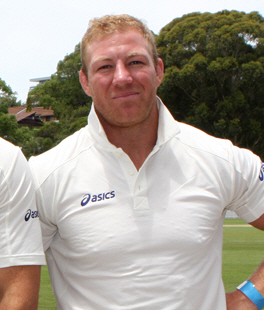
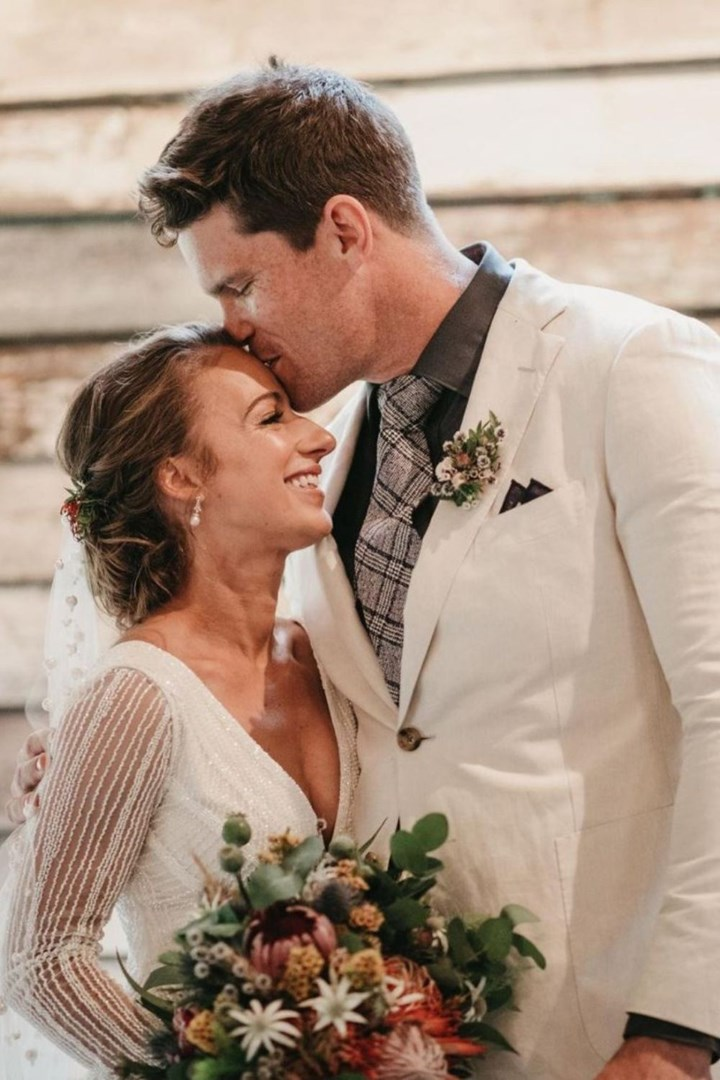
From left to right: Sandra Diaz-Twine, Michael Crocker, Samantha Gash and Mark Wales

The cast includes two-time American Survivor winner Sandra Diaz-Twine, former NRL player Michael Crocker, former MasterChef Australia contestant Khanh Ong and former Australian Survivor contestants Andy Meldrum, Mark Wales and Samantha Gash.

Contestant	Original tribe	Post- Swap tribes	Shuffled tribes	Post- Kidnap tribes	Merged tribe	Finish
Andy Meldrum; 49, Coolum Beach, QLD; Kate's brother Champions V Contenders II	Water					1st voted out Day 2
Briana Goodchild; 26, Brisbane, QLD; David's daughter	Water					2nd voted out Day 5
Kate Tatham; 46, Noosa, QLD; Andy's sister	Blood					3rd voted out Day 7
Alex Frost; 26, Melbourne, VIC; Jay's brother-in-law	Water	Water				Quit; Day 12
Jay Bruno; 34, Melbourne, VIC; Alex's brother-in-law	Blood	Blood				4th voted out Day 14
Sandra Diaz-Twine; 47, Riverview, Florida, USA; Nina's mother US: Pearl Islands, US: Heroes V Villains, US: Game Changers & US: Winners at War	Blood	Blood	Blood			5th voted out Day 16
Sophie Cachia; 31, Melbourne, VIC; KJ's sister	Blood	Water	Water			6th voted out Day 18
Amy Ong; 24, Melbourne, VIC; Khanh's sister	Blood	Blood	Blood			7th voted out Day 20
Alanna "Nina" Twine; 24, Fayetteville, North Carolina, USA; Sandra's daughter	Water	Water	Blood			Medically evacuated Day 22
Michael "Croc" Crocker; 41, Sunshine Coast, QLD; Chrissy's brother-in-law	Blood	Blood	Water	Water		8th voted out Day 23
Ben Watson; 33, Sunshine Coast, QLD; Shay's boyfriend	Blood	Blood	Water	Water		Lost Fire Duel (Note: Both Blood and Water attended Tribal Council on Day 24. The 9th and 10th players voted out would compete against each other in a fire-making duel. The winner returned to their tribe and remained in the game, while the loser was eliminated. Ben and Mel were voted out. Mel won the duel and returned to Blood, eliminating Ben.); Day 25
Khanh Ong; 28, Melbourne, VIC; Amy's brother	Water	Water	Water	Water	Lava	11th voted out 1st jury member Day 27
Melissa "Mel" Chiang; 33, Melbourne, VIC; Michelle's twin sister	Water	Water	Blood	Blood	Lava	12th voted out 2nd jury member Day 28
Jesse Hansen; 22, Canberra, ACT; Jordie's brother	Blood	Blood	Water	Water	Lava	13th voted out 3rd jury member Day 30
Michelle Chiang; 33, Sydney, NSW; Melissa's twin sister	Blood	Blood	Water	Water	Lava	Lost Purgatory Challenge; 4th jury member Day 36
Jordan Schmidt; 29, Melbourne, VIC; Josh's cousin	Blood	Blood	Blood	Blood	Lava	18th voted out 5th jury member Day 39
Samantha "Sam" Gash; 37, Melbourne, VIC; Mark's wife 2017	Blood	Blood	Water	Water	Lava	19th voted out 6th jury member Day 40
David Goodchild; 51, Morningside, QLD; Briana's father	Blood	Blood	Blood	Blood	Lava	20th voted out 7th jury member Day 42
Jordie Hansen; 25, Melbourne, VIC; Jesse's brother	Water	Water	Blood	Blood	Lava	21st voted out 8th jury member Day 43
Kate "KJ" Austin; 37, Melbourne, VIC; Sophie's sister	Water	Water	Water	Blood	Lava	22nd voted out 9th jury member Day 45
Josh Millgate; 31, Melbourne, VIC; Jordan's cousin	Water	Water	Blood	Blood	Lava	23rd voted out 10th jury member Day 46
Chrissy Zaremba; 42, Sunshine Coast, QLD; Croc's sister-in-law	Water	Water	Water	Water	Lava	Co runner-up Day 47
Shayelle "Shay" Lajoie; 31, Sunshine Coast, QLD; Ben's girlfriend	Water	Water	Blood	Blood	Lava	Co runner-up Day 47
Mark Wales; 41, Melbourne, VIC; Sam's husband 2017	Water	Water	Blood	Blood	Lava	Sole Survivor; Day 47

=== Future appearances ===
Jordie Hansen and Alanna "Nina" Twine competed on Australian Survivor: Heroes V Villains, with Hansen as a villain and Twine as a hero.

Outside of Survivor, Sam and Mark appeared on The Dog House Australia in 2022. In 2024, Sandra Diaz-Twine competed on the second season of The Traitors US. Khanh Ong competed on the tenth season of I'm a Celebrity...Get Me Out of Here! In 2024, Nina Twine competed on the USA Network show The Anonymous. Diaz-Twine also competed on 99 to Beat. Diaz-Twine and Twine competed on the second season of Extracted in 2026.

== Season summary ==
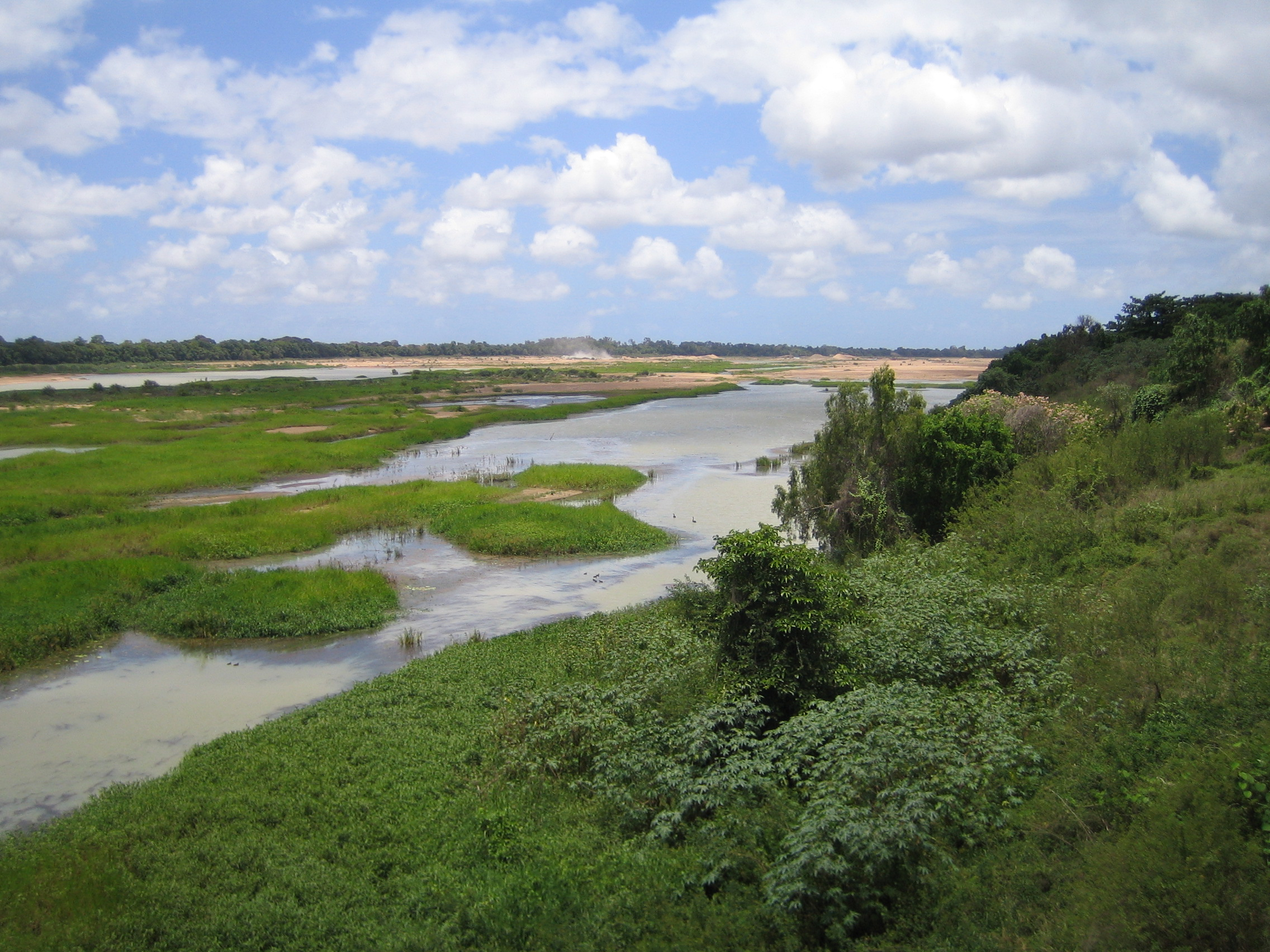
The season filmed in Charters Towers, Queensland.

Twelve pairs of loved ones were separated into two tribes, Blood and Water. On the Blood tribe, two-time U.S. Survivor champion Sandra sought to blend into the background and work with the strong men to keep herself safe. On the Water tribe, Sandra’s daughter Nina allied with Mark, Josh and Jordie to keep a comfortable majority. However, after a tribe swap left the two of them on the same tribe, Sandra was voted out as a big threat while Nina injured her ankle in a challenge and was removed from the game.

Married couple Mark and Sam took control of their respective swapped tribes. After declining to join his wife on the new Water tribe, Mark formed an alliance with the other strong males and found an idol to cement his power position in the tribe. On the new Water tribe, Sam formed a tight bond with Jesse and worked with him to eliminate dangerous threats like Croc and Ben.

At the merge, the four remaining intact couples formed a new majority alliance against the five single players. However, after Jordie attempted to rally votes against Mark, the alliance targeted his brother Jesse, with Sam conning him into giving her his idol before he was voted out. Jordie vowed revenge and tried to convince the tribe that Sam and Mark were too powerful with two idols. After a Purgatory twist forced Jordie, Shay and KJ to fight their way back into the game, Jordie finally succeeded in voting out Sam.

The trio of Mark, Josh and Chrissy dictated the majority of the late votes, with the two men surviving through idol plays and immunity wins. They were forced to turn on each other when Shay won the final two immunity challenges, with Josh being voted out just before the final 3. At the final Tribal Council, Mark emphasized his strong strategic play, while Shay highlighted her physical prowess to stay alive and Chrissy argued that her social bonds kept her safe. The jury unanimously voted for Mark in a 10-0-0 vote, awarding him the $500,000 and the title of Sole Survivor.

Challenge winners and eliminations by episode

Tribal phase (Days 1–25)
Episode		Challenge winner(s)		Eliminated	Finish
No.	Original air date	Reward	Immunity	Eliminated	Finish
1	31 January 2022	Water	Blood	Andy	1st voted out Day 2
2	1 February 2022	Water (Note: At the end of the reward challenge, Jonathan told the Water tribe that they could either give the Blood tribe part of their reward or keep it all for themselves. The Water tribe decided to give the Blood tribe the comfort items, while they kept the fishing gear.)	Blood	Briana	2nd voted out Day 5
3	2 February 2022	Blood (Note: At the end of the reward challenge, Jonathan told the Blood tribe representative (David) that he can choose a person from the losing tribe to go to the Survivor Storeroom together. It is further discovered that David could either give the Water tribe part of their reward or keep it all for themselves. David decided to keep all the items from the storeroom for the Blood tribe.)	Water	Kate	3rd voted out Day 7
4	6 February 2022	Blood	Water	No elimination on Day 9 due to a fake tribal council (Note: Instead of voting out a player, Blood unknowingly voted for a player to swap to the Water tribe. Sophie rejoined the game as a member of the Water tribe.)	
4	6 February 2022	[Shay] (Note: The Blood tribe were told to invite a castaway from the Water tribe on their reward; they chose Shay.)	Water	No elimination on Day 9 due to a fake tribal council	
5	7 February 2022	Water	Blood	Alex	Quit; Day 12
6	8 February 2022	Water	Water	Jay	4th voted out Day 14
7	13 February 2022	Water	Water	Sandra	5th voted out Day 16
8	14 February 2022	None	Blood	Sophie	6th voted out Day 18
9	15 February 2022	Blood	Water	Amy	7th voted out Day 20
10	20 February 2022	Blood (Note: The reward challenge had the tribes split into four quartets. The two winning quartets, regardless of tribe, won Reward. Coincidentally, both Blood quartets won reward.)	Blood	Nina	Medically evacuated Day 22
10	20 February 2022	Blood	Blood	No elimination on Day 22 due to a kidnap vote (Note: Instead of the Water tribe voting out a player, all players who received a vote were options for the Blood tribe to kidnap to their tribe. Ben, Khanh, and KJ received votes from the Water tribe, with Blood voting to have KJ join their tribe.)	
11	21 February 2022	None	Blood	Croc	8th voted out Day 23
12	22 February 2022	None	Shay	Mel	9th voted out (Note: Both Blood and Water attended Tribal Council on Day 25. The person voted out of each tribe would compete against each other in a fire-making duel. The winner returned to their tribe and remained in the game, while the loser was eliminated. Ben and Mel were voted out. Mel won the duel and returned to Blood, eliminating Ben.); Day 25
12	22 February 2022	None	~~Khanh~~ [Sam] (Note: Khanh gave his Immunity Necklace to Sam.)	Ben	10th voted out Day 25
12	22 February 2022	None		Ben	Lost Fire Duel; Day 25

Merge phase (Days 26–47)
Episode		Challenge winner(s)		Eliminated	Finish
No.	Original air date	Reward	Immunity	Eliminated	Finish
13	27 February 2022	Khanh	Jesse	Khanh	11th voted out 1st jury member Day 27
14	28 February 2022	None	Shay	Mel	12th voted out 2nd jury member Day 28
15	6 March 2022	Chrissy, Jordie [Jesse, Josh, Mark]	Jordie	Jesse	13th voted out 3rd jury member Day 30
16	7 March 2022	None	Jordie	Shay	14th voted out Purgatory (Note: On Day 32, 34 and 35 after being voted out, Shay, Jordie, KJ and Michelle respectively learnt that they would go to Purgatory and await a chance to return to the game.); Day 32
17	13 March 2022	Jordie [David, Jordan, Michelle]	Jordan	Jordie	15th voted out Purgatory; Day 34
17	13 March 2022	Jordie [David, Jordan, Michelle]	Jordan	KJ	16th voted out Purgatory; Day 34
18	14 March 2022	None	Mark	Michelle	17th voted out Purgatory; Day 35
18	14 March 2022	None	Mark	Michelle	Lost Purgatory Challenge; 4th jury member Day 36
19	20 March 2022	Survivor; Auction	Josh	Jordan	18th voted out 5th jury member Day 39
20	21 March 2022	None	Mark	Sam	19th voted out 6th jury member Day 40
21	27 March 2022	Shay [Jordie, Josh]	Josh	David	20th voted out 7th jury member Day 42
22	28 March 2022	None	Josh	Jordie	21st voted out 8th jury member Day 43
23	3 April 2022	None	Shay	KJ	22nd voted out 9th jury member Day 45
24	4 April 2022	None	Shay	Josh	23rd voted out 10th jury member Day 46
24	4 April 2022			Final vote	
24	4 April 2022			Chrissy	Co-runner-up; Day 47
24	4 April 2022			Shay	Co-runner-up; Day 47
24	4 April 2022			Mark	Sole Survivor; Day 47

== Episodes ==
No. overall	No. in season	Title	Timeline	Original release date
175	1	"Episode 1"	Days 1–2	31 January 2022
In the wilderness of Charters Towers, Queensland, twelve pairs of loved ones take on the challenge of Australian Survivor. The pairs include returning married couple Mark and Sam from Season 4, Andy from Season 6 and his sister, Kate, Master Chef contestant Khanh and his sister, Amy, professional rugby player Croc and his sister-in-law, Chrissy, and two-time U.S. Survivor winner Sandra and her daughter, Nina. Upon arriving, they are informed they will not be playing with their loved ones but, rather, against them. Each pair is divided into two tribes: Blood and Water.: Reward challenge: Going head-to-head against their loved one, contestants will slide down a water slide, go for a water ring, and try to get it back to their tribe-coloured pole. The first person to be touching the ring and their pole will score a point. First tribe to three points will win a fire pit at their campsite.; Water wins Reward. At camp, Chrissy admits she knows very little about Survivor and worries if she can survive without Croc. Andy hopes to redeem himself from his first time by playing a more lie low, social game and not telling as many lies. Mark also recognizes that his first go around, he relied too much on physical strength and didn't make social connections. He also works on his social game and tries to get to know everyone. When Mark notices Andy taking lead on the shelter building, he decides to step back and not try to put himself in a leadership position again. On Blood Tribe, everyone is both intrigued as well as watchful of Sandra being on their tribe. Sandra is aware that people know who she is, she will always have a target on her back, but she has watched Australian Survivor and has picked up a few tricks on how to play the game differently. Sandra hopes to blend in at the start, but when it is time to vote, she will do whatever it takes to survive one more round of the game. At Water, Shay finds a clue to a hidden immunity idol and shares it with Briana. The clue states that an idol will be placed on the front of Jonathan's podium at Tribal and the first person to grab it can use it at the first Tribal Council only. The clue warns that more than one copy of this clue is hidden. The two try to find the other copy, but Chrissy finds it first. When the tribes arrive for the Immunity Challenge, Alex reveals that he injured his back and is practically carried into the challenge site by his tribe. The challenge occurs without Alex's participation.: Immunity challenge: Tribes will carry a heavy battering ram over a ramp and smash through a series of reinforced walls. The ram will then be used as a ladder to climb over a tower. On the other side, they will have to throw hammers in order to break a series of targets. The first tribe to finish wins Immunity.; Blood Wins Immunity. At Water, several tribe members observe that Alex is a very well-liked tribemate, but his injury makes them worried if he can perform in challenges. Andy, not wanting to shake things up early, discusses with the group about just making the first vote an easy vote against Alex. Briana and Shay discuss a different plan of grabbing the idol and using it to try and blindside Chrissy as she struggled in the challenge; However, Nina is not a fan of either option and takes a page out of her mother's playbook: make sure any move you make benefits your own game, not just what benefits others. Nina believes that given Andy's history, she doesn't see herself working with him and she worries people are gravitating too much towards him. Nina discusses with Mark, Khanh, KJ, Mel, and Jordie about pretending the vote is for Alex, but actually blindsiding Andy. At Tribal Council, the tribe discusses Alex's injury and the effect it has had on the tribe. Shay initially tries to go for the idol with Briana's assistance, but Chrissy beats her to it. The tribe claims the idol won't affect their plans. When asked about challenge performance, Briana states that Chrissy was the weakest in the challenge. Andy observes that the tribe being a man down today was hard and hopes the trust he has built with people will come through. After the votes are cast, Chrissy plays the idol on herself; However, a majority nine votes are cast to blindside Andy. Andy becomes the first person voted out of Australian Survivor.
176	2	"Episode 2"	Days 3–5	1 February 2022
At Water, Shay leads the group on a yoga session to calm everyone's nerves, but a collapsed shelter roof causes a setback in the tribe. Nina is pleased that Andy is gone and believes she has built some trust in the game with Mark, Jordie, and Alex. Nina hopes to build trust with Khanh, but she is wary of him because he is incredibly social and physical with almost everyone in the tribe. Chrissy is happy to have survived Tribal, but hasn't forgotten that Briana called her weak and tried to block her from getting the idol last night. Chrissy hopes to target Briana next. Briana recognizes that calling Chrissy out was a bad call for her and she may have painted a target on herself. At Blood, the tribe is finally able to make fire on Day 3. While they celebrate their successes, they are also concerned about who got voted out on Water. The tribe notes that once a person's loved one is gone, it could change their gameplay. Sandra states that if Nina is gone, she will go on the warpath.: Reward challenge: In pairs, tribes will face off inside a cage. Their goal is to climb up a rope ladder to get out of the cage and grab a flag. Their opponents will try to stop them from getting the flag by impeding their progress on the rope ladder. The first tribe to score four points will win a fishing kit and comfort items like pillows, blankets, and a tarp.; Water wins Reward. They are then given a moral dilemma. They can either take everything for themselves, or they can give one item to their loved ones. Water decides to take the fishing gear, but gives Blood the comfort items. At Water, Briana desperately searches the fishing kit for an idol clue, but the entire tribe sees her doing this. Many people believe Briana is a very intense, hard gameplay and has played too hard, too soon. At Blood, Kate is devastated to see Andy leave and believes Water made a mistake voting him out. Kate worries that since she doesn't have a loved one, she has no connections on the other tribe and will be expendable to be voted out. Sam expresses some concern that Andy's style of gameplay will have influenced Kate and believes she may need to go next. Sam recalls that last time she played, she let the paranoia get to her and is hoping this time to play a more calm, social game, reconnect with Mark at merge, and take it to the end.: Immunity challenge: The tribe will drag three barrels over hurdles. They will then take three more barrels, move them through other obstacles, up a ramp, and then roll the barrels down another ramp to take out targets below. The first tribe to take out all of the targets will win Immunity.; Blood wins Immunity. Back at Water, the tribe discusses voting out Briana to get rid of the tension around camp and eliminate a huge game player. Briana attempts to put the target on Chrissy because she knows Chrissy doesn't like her; However, when Briana talks to people, she believes nobody is giving her a straight answer. Briana and Shay attempt to go look for an idol. Khanh notices the two are gone and takes a group out to trail them. Shay is able to find the idol in a tree and everyone runs over to help her. When the idol falls, Khanh immediately grabs it and gives it to Shay to ensure that Briana doesn't get it. Khanh and Nina both encourage Shay not to use the idol on Briana and keep it for herself. Because she is close to Briana, Shay is torn on whether she should use the idol to save her or if she should let the tribe vote her out. At Tribal, Briana and Chrissy both discuss feeling vulnerable. The tribe discusses the purpose of tonight's vote is to keep cohesion. The tribe also discusses trust and how important it is at this stage of the game. After the votes are cast, Shay decides not to play her idol and a majority nine votes are enough to send Briana home. Briana becomes the second person voted out of Australian Survivor.
177	3	"Episode 3"	Days 6–7	2 February 2022
At Water, Chrissy is glad to still be in the game after being at risk the first two Tribals. Khanh believes he has taken control of the tribe dynamics and solidifies an alliance with Mark. Mark is glad to align with Khanh because he is a strong competitor and Mark hopes Khanh can take him farther into the game. Khanh finds that too many people are looking to play a safe game, but he is not looking to play it safe. At Blood, the tribe has spent their first week bonding. Sandra observes that on Australian Survivor, the gameplay develops a bit slower so she's been trying to stay under the radar and not begin scheming just yet; However, Sandra has observed that David is in the worst position because he doesn't know much about Survivor, she thinks he will make rookie mistakes, and she hopes that he'll paint a target on himself first. David believes that the tribe should vote Sandra out the first chance they get because she has the experience to play the game and she could outwit them all.: Reward challenge: A tribe member will swim out to a pontoon loaded with sandbags. They will hook a rope to the platform and the other tribe members will pull it back. They will then carry all the sandbags through an obstacle course and pile them up by a pole. They will them climb up the pole and pull a lever to light a flare. First tribe to light the flare will win a trip to the Survivor store where they can claim up to three survival and/or luxury items for their tribe.; Blood wins Reward. They learn they can only send one person from their tribe to the store and, after much debate over sending Sandra or David, they choose David. David is allowed to choose one person from Water to join him and he chooses Khanh. At the store, the two discover a special super idol. Both David and Khanh can take half the idol, which alone is a regular idol. But, if they can join both idols together, they can form a super idol which can be played after the votes are read. At the store, Khanh tries to get David to give him an item to take back to Water, but David refuses because Water just voted out his daughter, Briana, and he is hurt by the decision. David takes a net, protein and nuts, and beef jerky back to camp. Khanh does explain to David why Briana was voted out and the two agree to use a signal to indicate if they still have their idols. If one of them tips their hat at a challenge, then the other will know that they played the idol. Back at camp, Khanh decides to reveal to Water Tribe that he got an idol whereas David decides to hide this fact from his tribe. The group doesn't believe he didn't get something for himself as the Survivor Store generally has advantages at it.: Immunity challenge: Tribes will race over a series of hurdles in a mud pit, chop down two huge logs, and use the second one to climb up a tower and down a slide. They will then remove a chain and move a chest of blocks to a tribe mat. They will then have to place the blocks on a balance beam to spell a word and keep them steady on the balance beam for three seconds. First tribe to do this will win Immunity.; Water wins Immunity. Back at Blood, the majority of the tribe proposes splitting the vote between Sandra and Kate in case Sandra has found an idol. However, not everyone is keen on voting out Sandra. Ben prefers to keep Sandra in the game over David and tells Sandra her name has been thrown around by David. Sandra decides to turn the tables on David. However, Sam doesn't want to see David leave because she feels she can trust him whereas Sandra is a huge threat to win. Kate notices that nobody has talked to her and informs David she knows she's in trouble. However, as they sit around the fire, David realizes that there are several conversations taking place around him and he thinks people are now plotting behind his back. At Tribal, Sandra discusses the differences between U.S. and Australian Survivor. Kate feels vulnerable because nobody talked to her today. Sam discusses that there were several plans discussed today. This causes David to start talking about Sam being a social butterfly and trying to plot against him. Sam states that she has never mentioned David's name, but was rather trying to save him which the tribe confirms. However, David still feels he is in trouble. Due to his behaviour, Sam begins to whisper to everyone to change the vote to David. After the votes are cast, David plays his idol on himself, negating nine votes. Sam did vote for Sandra in case David had an idol; However, David and Ben cast their votes for Kate in case of an idol play, which is enough to send her home. Kate becomes the third person voted out of Australian Survivor.
178	4	"Episode 4"	Days 8–9	6 February 2022
At Blood, Sandra is astounded by how much David messed up his game at Tribal. David admits to losing his nerve and becoming paranoid. David does apologize to everyone for his actions last night; However, Sam recognizes that when David called her out, he did so accurately because she is trying to be more social; Therefore, Sam hopes to throw so much shade at David that he cannot recover. At Water, Khanh believes he has solid control of the tribe and is happy to have an idol in his pocket; However, Mark believes that Khanh has become the biggest threat in the game and debates flushing his idol at their next Tribal Council.: Reward challenge: One person from each tribe will face off in a trench. They will start on opposite sides and race to the opposing side to ring a bell. They will be trying to stop their opponent from getting to the other side. The first tribe to three points will win a reward of coffee, tea, and croissants.; Blood wins Reward. Blood can choose one person from Water to join them and choose Shay. At camp, the tribe is able to ask Shay how their loved ones are doing. While Sam is missing Mark, she is glad they were not reunited for fear of painting a target on her. A four person alliance has developed on Blood between Sophie, Ben, Jordan, and Croc. Sophie believes that she has created a strong alliance where she can assert her game, but not be an immediate target. However, Sandra believes that Sophie has lacked self-awareness and is way too vocal about how close she is with the boys.: Immunity challenge: The tribes will work together and lift a heavy gate to retrieve a boat. They will use the boat to paddle out to retrieve a set of puzzle pieces. They will then use the pieces to solve a word arch puzzle. First tribe to spell the word right and keep their arch tower up for three seconds wins Immunity.; Water wins Immunity. Water is informed that while they are safe, they're still attending Blood's Tribal Council. At camp, there is an early consensus between Sophie, Ben, Jordan, Croc, Jesse, and Sam that David should leave next; However, when Sophie and Jordan tell Sandra to vote for David, Sandra believes that Sophie has gained too much power in the game and is dictating too much on who should leave. Sandra approaches Michelle and Amy with a plan to blindside Sophie. To not bring too much attention to herself, Sandra tasks Amy with getting the other votes. Amy discusses the vote with Jay, who wants to include David on the plan. To get the numbers, Amy talks with Jesse and Sam about voting for Sophie. The two realize they have found themselves in the middle as swing votes. At Tribal, the tribe discusses whether David's actions at the last Tribal will carry over into tonight; However, Sandra states that nobody is truly safe and she's always prepared to receive them at every Tribal. The tribe discusses their poor performance at the Immunity Challenge and if they have a leadership problem. Many people state the vote tonight will be based on unity. When the votes are cast, Sam and Jesse decide to side with Sandra and Amy's blindside of Sophie. However, when Sophie goes to have her torch snuffed, Jonathan informs her that while she's been voted out of the tribe, she's not out of the game. Instead, Sophie joins the Water tribe as its newest member; Therefore, nobody is voted out this episode.
179	5	"Episode 5"	Days 10–12	7 February 2022
At Water, Sophie feels betrayed by her former Blood tribe and is looking to get her revenge. While KJ is happy to be reunited with her sister, she does worry that Sophie's aggressive approach might get her in trouble. KJ also doesn't want to become collateral damage. At Blood, Sandra is proud of her move, but was not expecting Sophie to stay in the game. Sam could tell that Sophie was particularly bitter towards her for switching her vote. Ben, Croc, and Jordan are feeling on the outs and Sandra believes this is the first time they haven't felt solid in the game. Croc and Jordan actually seek advice from Sandra on how to move forward and she suggests they make some new relationships.: Reward challenge: One person from each tribe will swim out to a platform and use a bag to try and knock their opponent into the water. First tribe to reach three points will win a cheese platter.; Water wins Reward and are told they will enjoy their reward at Blood's campsite. During Mark's matchup with Jesse, Mark seeks information about Sophie and Jesse states that she is a snake. While many people are happy to be reunited with their loved ones for just one afternoon, Sophie takes the opportunity to get answers from her former tribe. Sophie becomes upset when Jordan won't even talk to her. Jordan admits he has to keep distance from Sophie so he doesn't paint a target on his own back. Sophie also confronts Sam about her betrayal. Sam states that Sophie creates a lot of drama and that will not bode well for her game. Sam asks Josh for the Water tribe to vote out Sophie next.: Immunity challenge: Each player will hold onto a heavy log that is tied to that of the other tribe members. Players can drop out, but that will increase the weight divided among their tribe members. Last person holding up a log for their tribe will win Immunity.; Due to an incredible performance of Ben holding up the log on his own, outlasting eight other people on Water, Blood wins Immunity. At Water, Alex is feeling pain in his back, again. The majority discusses a plan to get rid of Sophie since she is new to the tribe. However, KJ doesn't want to see her sister go just yet. KJ proposes that the tribe should blindside Khanh because he has an idol, he's a threat, and Sophie is the perfect fake target. The tribe is leaning towards this and Shay even volunteers herself in a split vote situation because she can also play her idol. The group plans a blindside to split the votes between Khanh, Shay, and Sophie so if Khanh plays his idol, then Sophie will leave. Khanh begins to observe that despite a simple plan existing to vote out Sophie, there are a lot of conversations going on around him. Shay tries to assure Khanh that he will be fine tonight, but Khanh debates whether he should play his idol. At Tribal, the tribe discusses Alex's back injury. Sophie, Khanh, and Shay all express feeling vulnerable for the vote, tonight. Sophie and KJ discuss the pros and cons of them being reunited. When Jonathan states it is time to vote, Alex informs the group that his back injury has affected him greatly and he doesn't want to hold back the tribe. Alex tells the tribe he wants to be voted out. When Jonathan asks if anyone would vote Alex out like he requested, nobody states they would and several encourage him to wait a day and see how he is feeling. Jonathan informs Alex that he always has the right to remove himself from the game. Alex decides to quit the game. Due to Alex quitting, no vote takes place and nobody else is voted out. Alex becomes the fourth person to leave Australian Survivor.
180	6	"Episode 6"	Days 13–14	8 February 2022
At Water, Sophie knows she has a target on her back and needs to make moves to shift the target to someone else. She floats the idea of forming a secret alliance with Khanh, but he is uninterested in working with her, knowing she is on the bottom and scrambling. He tells others of her proposal to make her seem sneaky and untrustworthy. At Blood, Sandra reflects on her Day 16 curse, as her last two Survivor outings saw her go home on Day 16. She suggests voting out Dave because she believes he wrote her name down at a previous tribal council, and she wants to break up the tight threesome of Dave, Amy and Jay. Sandra goes to the alpha male alliance and tells them that Amy wants to vote out one of them. Amy warns Dave that he is the next target and they begin planning to go after Sandra.: Reward challenge: Three members of each tribe face off in the water for control of a ball, attempting to get the ball back to their ramp. First tribe to win three rounds will win a reward of club sandwiches and fruit juice.; Water wins reward. Mark weighs his options for the next vote, as he wants to flush Khanh’s idol but also sees Sophie as too dangerous to keep in the game. At Blood, Sandra continues scheming against Dave and Amy, who decide to go hunting for an idol. Amy spots a package high in a tree and uses a pole to knock it down, earning herself a hidden immunity idol.: Immunity challenge: Each tribe sends one person at a time across a body of water and up a rope net to collect a ball before returning. Another tribe member then attempts to shoot the ball into a high chute. First tribe to successfully collect and shoot five balls will win immunity.; Water wins immunity in a blowout. Amy talks to the alpha males about potentially voting out Sandra, and they appear receptive to the idea. However, Michelle decides to tell Sandra that she saw Amy find an idol, and Sandra spreads the word to the rest of the tribe, hatching a plan to split the votes between Amy and Jay. Jordan warns Amy about the plan and tells her she needs to play her idol. At Tribal, Amy confirms to the whole tribe that she has an idol, which only Jay and Dave didn’t know about. Amy plays her idol for herself, negating three votes against her, but the split vote is successful in voting out Jay 4-3 over Sandra. Jay becomes the fourth person voted out of Australian Survivor.
181	7	"Episode 7"	Days 15–16	13 February 2022
At Water, Nina reflects on her strong position within the tribe and envisions herself going far with this group. When Jonathan announces a tribe swap, she hopes that she will not be on the same tribe as her mother Sandra, but they are both placed on the Blood tribe. Mark draws an empty package and is given a choice of which tribe he wants to join; he selects the Blood tribe, which disappoints Sam who was placed on Water. The two new tribes then face off for a reward challenge.: Reward challenge: Four members of each tribe row a small boat tethered to the other tribe’s boat, attempting to capture a flag on their side of the water and score a point. First tribe to three points wins a reward of hot dogs and soft drinks.; Water wins reward. At the new Water, Sam expresses surprise at Mark’s decision but trusts his judgment. She is also nervous about being on the same tribe as Sophie after betraying her, despite Sophie’s attempts to make her feel comfortable, she still wants to vote her out of the game. Chrissy finds an idol clue at the hot dog stand and shares it with Croc; they read it together and quickly locate the idol. Croc believes they should keep it a secret from everybody. At the new Blood, Jordie reflects on the good position in which the swap has left him and comments on how big of a threat Sandra is when paired with her daughter. Mark comments on his decision not to play with Sam, believing that it would have put a target on both of them. Sandra is concerned about playing with Dave and Amy who previously wrote her name down, but resolves to lie low and keep down her threat level. Nina keeps a distance from Sandra, not wanting to be seen as a power couple with her, and sticks to her previous alliance.: Immunity challenge: Both tribes traverse an obstacle course, collecting boxes along the way. They must smash open the boxes to obtain three balls, then manoeuver the balls through a table maze. First tribe to finish the maze wins immunity.; Water wins immunity. Sandra again reflects on her Day 16 curse, but is hopeful that she can rely on Nina and her alliance for tonight’s vote. Sandra suggests to Mark that they vote out Dave, but Jordie secretly wants to stick to old tribal lines and blindside Sandra. The majority alliance agrees, but they decide not to tell Nina. Nina begins to suspect that Sandra is the target after getting odd vibes from her alliance members. At Tribal, Sandra says she likes her new tribemates but is unsure of where she stands within the group. Jonathan asks if old tribal lines will come into play tonight, but Mark and Jordie deny it. When asked if strength is more important than loyalty, Sandra says that "strength can only get you so far and having people you can rely on is far more important". Before the votes are read, Shay plays an idol for herself but receives no votes. Sandra is voted out unanimously (even by Nina) and becomes the fifth person voted out of Australian Survivor.
182	8	"Episode 8"	Days 17–18	14 February 2022
At Blood, Nina reflects on her emotional decision to vote out Sandra, believing it was the best strategic move to prove she’s loyal to her alliance. Jordie believes he can use Sandra’s elimination for his resumé, but doesn’t want people to think he’s manipulating them too early in the game. The boys discuss Mel’s role in the tribe, labeling her as a “floater” who would be an easy next vote. At Water, Sam continues to feel uneasy with Sophie around, and she spreads word to her tribemates about how dangerous and unpredictable Sophie is. KJ reflects on how different her understated game is from her sister’s, and worries that Sophie being around could hurt her. Sam, Sophie and KJ discuss possibly working together to blindside Khanh and flush his idol.: Immunity challenge: Tribe members stand side by side, holding up discs by pressing them against each other’s palms. The last tribe to keep a disc upright wins immunity.; Blood wins immunity. Sam begins putting numbers together to split the vote between Sophie and KJ in case of an idol, but she also commits to flushing Khanh’s idol by using Sophie and KJ as numbers. This causes confusion among the majority alliance about which plan is real, and Chrissy worries that she’ll make a mistake as a result. Croc confides in KJ that Sophie is the true target, and KJ grapples with her loyalty to her sister and her desire to maintain relationships with her alliance members. Sophie goes hunting for an idol, and KJ worries that she might find one because it could mean she goes home instead. At Tribal, Khanh expresses worry that he could go home because of his idol. Sophie espouses her loyalty and promises to stay true to her word if the tribe keeps her. Sam calls out Sophie for her previous lies, which Sophie denies, making KJ emotional as she feels caught in between the two. Croc is concerned about the possibility of multiple idols coming into play, messing up everyone’s plans; However, no idols are played, and KJ joins the majority in voting for Sophie, who becomes the sixth person voted out of Australian Survivor.
183	9	"Episode 9"	Days 19–20	15 February 2022
At Water, KJ reflects on her “selfish” decision to vote out her sister for self-preservation, and hope she will understand and forgive her. She resolves to continue playing the game for the both of them. Sam wonders if her relationship with KJ can be repaired. Sam and Chrissy discuss the next vote, weighing the prospects of voting out KJ versus flushing Khanh’s idol. At Blood, Amy is concerned about her position within her swapped tribe, as her old tribe is outnumbered 6-3. She discusses with Mark the possibility of voting out her old ally Jordan, who is now paired with his cousin Josh. Josh knows that Jordan’s presence will put a target on him and he’ll eventually have to play more aggressively to take control. Nina wants to work with Josh, but knows eventually she may have to break ties with him for the sake of her own game.: Reward challenge: One player from each tribe stands on a narrow perch, while a teammate attempts to pull a beam to knock the other tribe’s player off their perch into the water and score a point. First tribe to score three points wins a food reward of fish and chips.; Blood wins reward. Shay is thankful for the food rewards as an opportunity for camaraderie and keeping the tribe strong for immunity challenges. Josh has his sights set on Mel for the next vote, believing she is their weakest challenge performer and wanting to stay strong until merge. At Water, Chrissy is frustrated by the tribe’s losing streak in food reward challenges, denying them crucial energy. Khanh notes the low morale around camp but doesn’t care about the reward challenges, only wanting to win immunities to keep himself safe. The tribe is also bothered by Ben’s emotional outbursts after losing challenges, and they consider targeting him at the next vote.: Immunity challenge: One at a time, tribe members use a long pole to carry spools across an obstacle course and stack them atop a narrow perch. If the course is jostled too much it will destabilize the perch and knock over the stack, forcing the tribe to start over. First tribe to stack eight spools on top of each other wins immunity.; Water wins immunity, thanks to a major mistake by Jordan. At Blood, Jordan feels guilty for causing the tribe to lose and begins scrambling for numbers. He and Josh plan to target Mel, and most of the tribe agrees that she would be an easy vote. Jordan informs Amy of the plan, but she doesn’t know if she can trust him anymore and wants Jordan to go instead. Amy attempts to get Shay on her side, but Shay goes straight to Josh and tells him of Amy’s plan. Josh and Jordan scheme to switch the vote onto Amy instead. Nina grapples with whether to stay true to her old alliance or to get rid of Jordan so that she can be Josh’s primary ally. At Tribal, Jordan says he feels responsible for the challenge loss. Josh reiterates his belief that the tribe should stay strong, but Dave points out that Amy was their best competitor in today’s challenge and that brute strength isn’t everything. Amy expresses frustration at the players who are simply following orders and wishes they would make bigger moves. Mel and Nina discuss the impending merge and how it impacts their decision-making for the next few votes. The tribe ultimately turns on Amy, splitting the vote between her and Mel, and Amy becomes the seventh person voted out of Australian Survivor.
184	10	"Episode 10"	Days 21–22	20 February 2022
At Blood, Nina reflects on her decision to vote out Amy over Jordan, believing it was the right call. She feels comfortable in the majority alliance with the guys, but wants to assert control over the tribe eventually. The guys discuss voting out Shay, and Nina agrees to consider it, but she secretly wants to work with Shay and use the strong guys as shields when merge comes. She suggests voting out Mel instead, which the guys are receptive towards. At Water, Jesse feels good about his majority position and his under-the-radar play but knows he’ll have to make big moves soon. He wants to vote out Ben, a challenge threat whose partner Shay is also a dangerous player when merge comes. He secretly hopes the tribe continues to lose reward challenges so the big guys stay hungry and irritated to annoy the tribe. He discusses strategy with Sam, who agrees that Ben should go before merge.: Reward challenge: Each tribe is divided into two teams. Two members from each team slide down a water slide and collect balls, attempting to shoot them into a basket from the water to score a point. First two teams to score two points for their tribe win a food reward of quiche, bread, cheese and sauces.; Blood wins reward. During the challenge, Nina injures her ankle and doesn’t know how serious it will be. Mark knows that there could be an idol or advantage clue hidden somewhere at the reward, and he finds one in a potted plant. Jordie secretly sees Mark find it, planning to use that information against him later. A medical staff member arrives at the reward to examine Nina’s ankle, determining that she needs x-rays and temporarily pulling her out of the game. Prior to the next immunity challenge, Nina is brought back in a walking boot, having fractured her foot. The doctors have determined that the risk of re-injury is too great, and Nina is pulled from the game after an emotional goodbye from her tribe.: Immunity challenge: Tribes traverse an obstacle course together before releasing sandbags and firing them from a slingshot at a series of targets. First tribe to knock down all their targets wins immunity, in addition to reward in the form of a secret advantage in the game.; Blood wins immunity and reward, despite falling far behind early. At Water, the majority alliance discuss splitting the vote between Michelle and Khanh. However, Jesse still wants to blindside Ben, and hatches a plan to split the vote between him and Khanh instead. Chrissy is concerned about how far Khanh has got with his idol, and she and Croc contemplate flipping the vote onto him. KJ is also annoyed by how Jesse has been telling her what to do, and considers joining them. Chrissy accidentally tips off Ben that his name has been discussed, further threatening Jesse’s plan. At Tribal, the Blood tribe sits in as spectators thanks to their previous advantage, and the Water tribe is instructed to vote immediately with no discussion. Ben is voted out over Khanh and KJ, but the Blood tribe then reads their advantage in full, which allows them to steal a player from the Water tribe, but only among players who received votes in tonight’s tribal council. During a discussion, Shay hopes that she can reunite with Ben. Mark weighs the pros and cons of creating another pair versus taking a single player. Jordie contemplates the repercussions of whomever they pick and how it will impact the other tribe. The Blood tribe votes to steal KJ and leave Ben with his old tribe for maximum conflict.
185	11	"Episode 11"	Day 23	21 February 2022
At Blood, Shay is disappointed that her tribe did not choose to steal Ben and worries that she may be on the bottom. KJ is excited to be back with old allies after the twist, and begins strategizing with Jordie to target Shay at the next vote. KJ comments on how the tribe has become a “boys club” but wants to work with the men over the women. At Water, Chrissy is frustrated about the twist keeping Ben in the game, making things awkward around camp. Ben tells everyone that there are no hard feelings, but Chrissy and Jesse are still concerned about what will happen if he makes it to merge. Jesse proposes throwing the next immunity challenge to ensure Ben is voted out next. Ben resolves to lie low and look for an opportunity to get even by voting out Chrissy.: Immunity challenge: Tribe members use a paddle to manoeuver a ball through a maze, passing it off to teammates after completing their section. First tribe to get three balls through the maze wins immunity.; Blood wins immunity after Jesse and Chrissy successfully throw the challenge. Sam believes Ben is the easy vote, wanting to finished unresolved business from the last tribal council. Croc is still hesitant to break ties with his old ally Ben, and he plans to flip the votes onto Jesse who he believes is a bigger threat. However, Ben informs Jesse and Sam of Croc’s plan, and the three decide to bring in Michelle to switch the vote onto Croc. Chrissy is conflicted about turning on Jesse, with whom she has a good relationship, and considers going against Croc to vote in her own best interests. At Tribal, Chrissy and Ben reiterate that yesterday’s vote is in the past and they are back to normal. Sam says that Ben’s blindside was a sign of respect for his game. Jesse discusses how quickly things change in Survivor and how lines drawn in the sand are never permanent. Khanh is nervous that he hasn’t heard his name brought up in discussion today, which could mean a blindside is imminent. Croc explains how his vote is based on setting himself up well for the merge, but Sam cautions that they don’t know how far away the merge will be. Chrissy ultimately decides to vote for Ben against Croc’s wishes, but it doesn’t matter as Croc is blindsided, becoming the eighth person voted out of Australian Survivor.
186	12	"Episode 12"	Days 24–25	22 February 2022
At Water, Ben feels confident about his new position in the tribe and believes he has earned Jesse’s trust permanently. Chrissy is devastated by Croc’s blindside, but she resolves to get revenge on whoever was behind it. She is surprised to learn from Sam that it was Ben’s plan, but she nonetheless plots to get him out next. At Blood, Mark feels comfortable in his guys’ alliance and believes he can ride it all the way into the merge. He views Shay as the biggest threat on the tribe and plans to target her at the next vote. Mark later finds the immunity idol, which he found a clue for at a previous reward, and believes he is the only one who knows about it. However, Jordie confronts him about the clue, having seen him find it at the reward. Mark tells Jordie about the idol to build trust, but Jordie plans to use that information against Mark later to create chaos.: Immunity challenge: Players stand on narrow pegs, balancing a ball against a plank with a rolling pin. Last member of each tribe left standing wins individual immunity, with both tribes attending tribal council that night.; Shay and Khanh win immunity, but Khanh gives Sam his necklace after she passes out due to low blood pressure. At Blood, Jordie is annoyed that Shay won immunity, forcing the boys to choose between Mel and KJ. Jordie suggests splitting the vote and sending Mel home, to ensure that she doesn’t make the merge and team up with her sister Michelle. KJ knows that she’s on the chopping block, but the boys reassure her that Mel will get the majority of votes. Shay is annoyed that the boys made the plan without consulting with her, and she suggests that she and Mark vote for KJ instead. At Water, Chrissy talks to Sam and Khanh about going after Ben, and while they agree to the plan, she is unsure if she can trust them. Ben knows that Chrissy is targeting him, and he hatches a plan to split the votes on Khanh and Chrissy to flush Khanh’s idol and send Chrissy home. Sam and Jesse discuss whether to go along with Ben or Chrissy’s plan. At Tribal, Mel and KJ are concerned about the boys’ majority and knows that they are on the chopping block, but Mark says that it may not be that simple. Shay also implies that old tribal lines could come into play, and Mark has been close with both Mel and KJ since Day 1. Jordie suggests that there may be an idol somewhere among the Blood tribe, but does not reveal what he knows about Mark. Chrissy feels that her trust in Ben was broken, but does not believe that she is going home tonight. Ben defends his decision to turn on Croc and still believes he is a trustworthy person. Sam discusses her effort in the immunity challenge that led to her passing out, and says she wanted to make her tribe and her loved ones proud. Khanh says that his effort was just as much about personal pride as winning immunity. Ben whispers to Khanh that he is receiving votes and should play his idol for himself. Regardless, Khanh does not regret giving up his necklace to Sam, and gets emotional reflecting on the strong bonds he’s formed within the tribe. Before reading the votes, Jonathan reveals that the two people voted out will compete in a firemaking challenge, with the winner avoiding elimination. No idols are played, and Mel and Ben are voted out of their respective tribes. Mel wins a close firemaking challenge, returning to her tribe, sending Ben out of the game.
187	13	"Episode 13"	Days 26–27	27 February 2022
At Blood, Jordie reflects on how hard the game has been thus far, but still feels grateful to be there. He also comments on the complications of familial relations affecting the game, and is excited to team up with his brother Jesse at the merge. The two tribes come together for a challenge, where Jonathan announces that the two tribes are no more and they are officially merged.: Reward challenge: Players balance a wobbly table with a rope, transferring puzzle pieces one by one from their station to assemble them into a pyramid on the table. First to complete the puzzle and return to their station wins $60,000.; Khanh wins reward. Players then return to the old Water camp for a merge feast. Khanh and Shay believe it is an advantage to not have a loved one with him at the merge, as their threat levels are lower and they feels free to play their own game. Jordie disagrees, believing that having his brother around gives him twice the power. He tells Jesse about Mark’s idol, and the two of them resolve to stay under the radar and not appear too strategic to the others too early. Mel and Michelle plan to share information and use their status as identical twins to their advantage, and they plan to target Shay first. Sam is excited to be playing with Mark again, and wants to rewrite their history as a Survivor power couple that got them voted out in a previous season. Jordie mentions to Sam that Mark has an idol, which frustrates Sam because Mark hadn’t told her about it. She confronts Mark, who argues that he planned to tell her later in the day but Jordie simply beat him to it. Sam is still annoyed at him, but she admits that this will make Mark seem more trustworthy to Jordie. Mark still feels comfortable in his five-man alliance with Jordie, Jesse, Josh and Jordan. He considers targeting Khanh first because he is a challenge threat and still has an idol. Shay names the merge tribe “Lava” because it looks like blood but runs like water.: Immunity challenge: Players hold a bar tethered to a bucket over their head. If they drop their bar, the bucket tips over and drops water, eliminating them. Last player standing wins immunity.; Jesse wins immunity after battling with KJ for nearly an hour. Shay is upset about her lapse in concentration at the challenge, and believes she may be on the chopping block. Mark plans to target Khanh, and he hatches a plan to split the votes between Khanh and Mel to flush his idol. However, Sam wants to target Shay, believing she is a bigger threat and seeing Khanh as a loyal ally. Mark and Sam meet to discuss strategy, and they argue over who the more dangerous player is. Sam is frustrated that the five guys’ alliance is running the show and doesn’t like being told what to do. Jesse remains loyal to Sam and also considers breaking away from his loved one to target Shay instead of Khanh. At Tribal, Shay is nervous because she hasn’t had a chance to bond with everyone and feels on the outs. KJ is also concerned that the couples outnumber the singles and could pick them off one by one. Sam discusses the challenges of playing with a loved one and getting on the same page after spending so long apart. Mark emphasizes the importance of this vote to determine where people’s alliances truly lie. Khanh knows that he is a high-profile target but affirms his trust in his alliance members and feels confident in tonight’s vote. Sam and Jesse ultimately decide to join the couples' majority in voting out Khanh, who becomes the first member of the jury.
188	14	"Episode 14"	Day 28	28 February 2022
Mark and Sam apologize to one another, but both remain frustrated that they are not on the same page. Mark is confident that Sam will eventually realize that voting out Khanh was the right decision, and he feels good about his position within the six-person majority alliance. Sam is uncomfortable with her lack of agency in the vote and worries that Mark has been blinded by his “bromance” with the other strong guys. Shay knows she is on the chopping block and hopes to keep winning challenges. Jordie is starting to grow tired of how comfortable the other guys in the alliance are getting and hopes to shake things up soon. He tells Josh about Mark’s idol, and they begin to formulate a plan to blindside him.: Immunity challenge: Players fill a leaky bucket to elevate a counterweight, then attempt to assemble a block puzzle atop a platform. If the bucket loses too much water the counterweight will tip the platform over, forcing them to start over. First player to complete the puzzle wins immunity.; Shay wins immunity. Sam is frustrated that they didn’t vote Shay out when they had the chance. She considers Josh the mastermind of the majority alliance, and worries that she hasn’t had many strategy talks with him. Mark doesn’t think it’s the right time to expose the alliance, but Sam worries that one of them will be blindsided if they wait too long. Josh tells Jordan about Mark’s idol, and the two of them agree that Jordie is manipulating them with the information and don’t trust him long-term. However, they feel they need to keep the alliance together for now and pick off one of the twins first. They begin assembling numbers to split the vote and vote out Mel. Mel and Michelle know they are on the chopping block and begin scrambling for a new plan. They talk to the women about voting Josh, arguing that a threat should go first and the boys have too much control. Sam acknowledges that sending Mel home would give the men a majority over the women, but worries about targeting the majority alliance without being sure they have the numbers. Michelle is concerned about the plan failing because she would be on the bottom after her sister left the game. At Tribal, Josh admits that there is a majority alliance that has been working together to run the game. Dave believes the alliance is a committee with no set leader, and Mark agrees, saying that it diffuses responsibility for each vote among all members. Mel says that she knows she and Michelle are the primary targets of this vote, but believes there are bigger threats after which to go. Michelle throws out Josh’s name as a possible vote, and encourages everyone not to just be a follower and to vote in their own best interests. However, the majority holds strong and votes out Mel, making her the second member of the jury.
189	15	"Episode 15"	Days 29–30	6 March 2022
Michelle is disappointed that her sister was voted out, but proud that Mel went down swinging. She knows she is still in the minority against the “committee” alliance, and again singles out Josh as the head of the committee. Josh knows he is a big player but is trying to downplay his threat level. He is concerned about Jordie’s loose lips and considers him untrustworthy, and begins planning a blindside with Mark and Sam. However, Sam is close with Jordie’s brother Jesse and considers Josh a bigger threat that she may want to target first.: Reward challenge: Players are tethered together in pairs and must work together to retrieve blocks of varying shapes and sizes and stack them atop a wobbly platform. First pair to stack all their blocks without the stack falling wins a food reward of KFC chicken and chips.; Chrissy and Jordie win reward, and they are allowed to choose three more players to join them; they choose Jesse, Mark and Josh. Everyone is paranoid that there could be an idol clue hidden at the reward and begin searching. Jordie finds the clue tucked in a towel; he successfully hides it in Jesse’s shorts without anyone noticing. Later back at camp, others notice how shady Jordie is acting and suspect he found something. Sam confronts Jordie, who does not reveal his clue and reiterates that they should target Josh next. Mark believes that Jordie is lying and plans to target him next.: Immunity challenge: Players stand on a post using two ropes to balance a ball atop a suspended track. At intervals, they must step back onto progressively smaller posts, making it more difficult to balance. Last player standing with their ball upright wins immunity.; Jordie outlasts Mark to win immunity. The committee quickly concocts a plan to split the vote between Shay and KJ, but secretly Jordie and Jesse are targeting Josh. However, Mark trusts Josh and Jordan more, and they plan to flip the vote onto Jesse. Sam is unhappy when Mark shares the plan with her, because Jesse is her tightest ally aside from Mark. Jesse begins to suspect that something is off with his allies and sets out to locate the idol. He locates the idol, but Sam walks up on him as he unwraps it; she convinces him to let her hold onto the idol so that no one sees him return to camp with it in his pocket. At Tribal, David says that the committee is still strong, but Sam suggests that there are sub-committees within the majority. Jordie, Josh and Jesse assert that the plan is similar to last time and they will be picking off another minority member tonight. Mark believes there are idols in play and worries that they will disrupt everyone’s plan. Jonathan notes that no idols have been played correctly this season, and Sam comments on how tricky it is to utilize one correctly. Jesse and Josh both espouse trust in their allies and feel confident that their plan will go through tonight. Sam elects to keep Jesse’s idol for herself, and Jesse is voted out, becoming the third member of the jury. On his way out, Jesse informs Jordie that Sam stole his idol.
190	16	"Episode 16"	Days 31–32	7 March 2022
Sam knows that she just pulled off a huge move in the game, and that her and Mark’s threat levels have just increased. Sam proposes a deal with Jordie to keep him safe from future votes in exchange for silence about her idol, to which Jordie agrees. However, Jordie is secretly devastated by Jesse’s departure and vows to get revenge on his behalf. He approaches the other single players about forming a new alliance against the couples, and sets his sights on Sam for the next vote. Mark and Sam discuss the dangers of Jordie knowing about her idol and contemplate whether to keep him close or vote out him as soon as possible. Jordie knows the upcoming immunity challenge will be a must-win for him to survive another day.: Immunity challenge: Players stand on narrow footholds while holding onto two ropes overhead. At intervals, they must step down to narrower footholds, making it harder to balance. Last player left standing wins immunity.; Jordie wins immunity after Shay passes out an hour and a half in. Sam is annoyed that she can’t vote out Jordie tonight, but plans to vote out another single and suggests Shay. Jordie feels like he has nothing to lose and plans to stir chaos by going after Mark, whom he considers a bigger challenge threat than Sam. In order to convince the other singles, he decides to tell everyone that both Mark and Sam have idols. Sam suspects that Jordie is plotting against her, but Mark urges her to stay calm and avoid drawing attention to the two of them. David contemplates whether to play it safe tonight or to go along with Jordie’s plan to break up the power couple. At Tribal, David says that the tribe is in flux after last night’s blindside. Jordie is thrilled to have the immunity necklace, knowing he was on the outs after Jesse’s departure. Sam urges the majority six to stay strong, but Jordie points out that six people can’t all get to the end together. David respects Jordie’s hard gameplay and agrees that everyone should be playing in their own best interests. Sam says that not making a move can be just as valuable as making moves for its own sake. Jordie whispers to David and Chrissy that they should join his side and vote out Mark. Mark and Sam decline to play their idols, and the majority holds strong to vote out Shay. However, after leaving Tribal, Shay learns that she has been sent to Purgatory where she will await a chance to get back into the game.
191	17	"Episode 17"	Days 33–34	13 March 2022
Shay arrives at Purgatory and makes a shelter for the night, feeling nervous about her prospects in the game. Sam confronts Jordie about his actions at last night’s Tribal, as he had previously sworn loyalty to her and Mark. Jordie wants Sam to believe that Mark is his primary target, when he actually wants her out next as revenge for Jesse’s blindside. Jordie tries to convince the others that Mark and Sam both have idols, but they are all unconvinced that he is telling the truth. Sam talks to her allies about Jordie, pinpointing him as the biggest threat to win the game and too dangerous to keep around causing chaos. Josh and Jordan notice how paranoid Sam appears to be and wonder if she is sinking her own game.: Reward challenge: Players race through an obstacle course collecting bags of balls. They must then navigate the balls along a table frame and land them in five goals. First player to land all their balls wins the new Isuzu MU-X and a drive-in movie experience with nachos and margaritas.; Jordie wins reward, and he gets to choose three people to accompany him; he picks Jordan, Dave and Michelle. Jordie explains that he chose these three specific people to continue convincing people that Sam is untrustworthy. They watch videos from their loved ones back home, and Jordie repeats his claim about Sam stealing Jesse’s idol, but they remain unsure if they believe him or not. Jordie offers himself as bait for the next vote so that if Sam plays her idol, he will be going home.: Immunity challenge: Players stand on a narrow beam balancing a statue over their head with a pole. At intervals, they must move onto narrower sections of the beam. Last person left standing on the beam with their statue upright wins immunity.; Jordan outlasts Jordie to win immunity. Jordie is disappointed in the loss, but feels confident about the plan he’s concocted to get out Sam. Sam knows that Jordie has been spreading word about her idol and worries that he has put a target on her back. Jordie tries to convince Josh to flip on Sam, knowing that the others won’t make a move unless they see him make it first. Sam confronts Jordie directly, who confirms that he isn’t interested in working with her or Mark. Several people comment on how erratic and paranoid Sam is acting, and weigh whether she is more dangerous to keep around than Jordie. At Tribal, Mark comments on Shay’s absence from the jury, wondering if there is a twist in store. Sam notes how few people she spoke to today, fearing that she is the target tonight. Jordan comments on Jordie’s effort at the last few challenges and how much of a physical threat he is. Jordie is unsure why he is considered more of a threat than two people with idols, but Mark and Sam deny it, with Sam promising to empty her bag when they get back to camp tonight. Josh weighs both sides of the conflict and how difficult it is to determine the truth in this game. Mark and Sam decline to play their idols, and Jordie is voted out unanimously. Jonathan then announces that they will immediately vote another person out without discussion. Again no idols are played, and KJ is voted out. Jordie and KJ learn that they have been sent to Purgatory and will have a chance to get back into the game.
192	18	"Episode 18"	Days 35–36	14 March 2022
Michelle comments on Shay’s absence at Tribal the night before, knowing that there must be a twist coming. Sam talks to her tribemates about Jordie and continues denying having an idol, but Michelle suggests to her that people do believe Jordie’s story. She and Mark feel that it’s best to stick with Jordan and Josh, and Sam moves her idol from her bag into Mark’s in case someone decides to snoop through it. Josh continues to doubt that Sam has an idol, but he knows for sure that Mark has one and contemplates breaking up the couples’ alliance.: Immunity challenge: Players race through an obstacle course collecting rings, then attempt to land them on a series of posts. First three players to land all their rings move onto the final round, where they attempt to launch fireballs into a pit. First player to land two fireballs in their pit wins immunity.; Mark beats Josh and Jordan in the final round to win immunity. The players also learn about the existence of Purgatory, and that the person voted out tonight will be the fourth person sent there. Sam hopes to be able to save both her and Mark’s idols tonight, and they discuss voting out David with their alliance. However, Josh believes Mark and Sam are too powerful and wants to flush one of their idols. He concocts a plan to make Sam paranoid enough to play an idol while still keeping the couples intact. David plans to stoke her paranoia by hunting for idols and talking about a potential blindside. At Tribal, David suggests that the six-person majority will still hold strong tonight, but Michelle reiterates that six people can’t all get to the end together. Josh says the only way to feel secure is to win an immunity necklace, and suggests that Sam could become a target thanks to Mark’s necklace and his known idol. Jonathan confirms that multiple people will re-enter the game in tomorrow’s Purgatory challenge, which worries Chrissy, believing they might be vengeful when they return. Josh believes that Jordie stands a good chance of returning, which could affect the decision of whom to send to Purgatory tonight. Mark declines to play an idol on Sam, and Michelle is voted out 6-1. She arrives at Purgatory and delivers the news that tomorrow they will compete in a challenge to return to the game. The four players discuss strategy for once they re-enter the game; they plan to act like they are reintegrating with the majority but secretly hope to work together to break it up. The following day, the four arrive for their challenge, with the six remaining players in the game spectating.: Purgatory challenge: Players balance a ball on a pole and traverse an obstacle course, adding sections to the pole as they go. They then drop their balls into an overhead chute, attempting to land them in a bucket of water. First three people to land all their balls will re-enter the game.; Jordie, Shay and KJ complete the challenge and re-join the tribe, while Michelle becomes the fourth member of the jury.
193	19	"Episode 19"	Days 37–39	20 March 2022
Sam and Chrissy lament that all the hard work voting out Shay, Jordie and KJ was wasted when they came back into the game. Jordie feels that he got a second chance thanks to Purgatory and intends to make the most of the opportunity. He is still angry with Sam for stealing Jesse’s idol and lying about it, and he intends to create chaos and make Sam paranoid. Sam knows that Jordie is desperate and gunning for her, which makes him too dangerous to keep in the game.: Survivor Auction: Each player gets $500 to bid on various reward items, with the highest bidder winning each item.; Chrissy, Jordan, David, Mark and Shay won food items. Shay also won a letter from home, but she gave it up to give everyone else theirs. KJ won a cup of tea, which had a clue concealed underneath it to the location of an advantage. Back at camp, Shay hopes that her decision will earn her some goodwill with the tribe but considered it a no-brainer. KJ finds her advantage, which gives her the power to send three people back to camp from Tribal Council before the vote, rendering them safe but preventing them from voting.: Immunity challenge: Players race through an obstacle course and use a grappling hook to retrieve bags of puzzle pieces. They must then construct a three-tiered tower puzzle. First to complete their tower wins immunity.; Josh wins immunity. Sam continues to push for Jordie to go, and the majority six plans to stay strong and vote him out again. Jordie appeals for Josh and Jordan to go after Sam or Mark to flush one of their idols. Josh weighs the pros and cons of keeping a dangerous threat in the game versus waiting too long to make a move on the other couple. Sam and Mark know that one of them could be going home, and they decide to leave both of their idols back at camp so the person who survives would be guaranteed to keep both. At Tribal, Josh reiterates the hard work that went into voting out Jordie and hopes they will finish the job tonight. However, KJ reveals her advantage from the auction, and chooses to send Chrissy, Mark and Josh back to camp. Mark pretends to give Sam an idol from his bag before leaving. KJ hopes to convince David to vote with her tonight, and Sam bluffs that she has the idol to try and shift the vote away from her. David decides to flip on the majority, but the true target is Jordan, who becomes the fifth member of the jury in a 4-2 vote.
194	20	"Episode 20"	Day 40	21 March 2022
Josh is furious to learn that Jordan went home, and vows to get revenge on David for flipping. Jordie reflects on the decision to vote for Jordan over Sam because of the threat of an idol, believing it was the right move and that he has control of the game now. He still wants Sam out of the game and plans to separate the last remaining couple at the next Tribal Council. Sam is relieved that she was not the target since she left her idol back at camp, and she and Mark discuss what to do with their idols at the next Tribal. Sam hopes to convince Dave and Chrissy that Jordie is still too dangerous to keep around. However, Chrissy has become convinced that Sam and Mark are the biggest threats in the game and contemplates flipping on them as well.: Immunity challenge: Players roll a ball up a ramp, then assemble a row of blocks on a platform like dominoes. If they don’t catch their ball in time, it will knock over the blocks, forcing them to begin again. First player to knock their row of blocks down and into a bucket wins immunity.; Mark wins immunity. Mark argues that the three “second-chance” players are too dangerous to align with, and hopes to dissuade Josh from voting emotionally for David. Jordie and David both talk to Josh about voting Sam, describing how convincing her bluff was at the previous Tribal and how sneaky of a player she is. Sam and Mark are nervous that they won’t have the numbers tonight, but they believe that Josh is solid and David will rejoin them to vote out Jordie. Jordie knows that if Sam plays her idol he will likely be going home, but he’s willing to take the risk. At Tribal, Josh says he feels vulnerable now that Jordan is gone and still wants revenge for his blindside. David again describes how convincing Sam’s acting was at the last Tribal, which makes Sam nervous that he is not on her side. Mark says that tonight’s vote is important as it will determine who will be in the new majority, and believes that it may be a 4-4 tie vote. Jordie says that he believes Josh will stick to his old alliance, and Sam agrees that she trusts Josh not to flip. Before the votes are read, Josh urges Mark to play an idol on Sam, but Mark declines. Sam is voted out 5-3, making her the sixth member of the jury.
195	21	"Episode 21"	Days 41–42	27 March 2022
Mark is devastated about Sam’s departure, and can’t understand why Josh flipped. Josh explains that he only targeted Sam in the hopes of flushing the idol, but now Mark believes the second-chance players have all the power and they are the next two targets. Mark plans to keep Josh close in the hopes of using him as a shield, while believing David has become a big strategic threat who needs to go. Jordie is happy that Sam has gone and believes that he has the majority. He hopes to continue secretly working with Josh, knowing they are both physical and strategic threats that need to stick together. They plot to target Mark at the next Tribal Council.: Reward challenge: Players hold onto a rope while suspended over water. Last player standing wins a spa day and steak dinner with two other players of their choice.; Shay wins reward, and despite promising to take KJ and Chrissy with her, she cuts a deal with Jordie and Josh to take them instead. Jordie is thrilled that he managed to convince Shay to take him and hopes to cement a new alliance with her and Josh. Jordie tries to convince them that Mark has two idols, but they continue to believe he only has one. The three of them plan to work together for the next couple of votes to eliminate Mark and David. Back at camp, KJ and Chrissy feel burned by Shay breaking her promise and question whether they can continue working with her. KJ believes that the Purgatory “alliance” is no more and doesn’t trust Shay or Jordie anymore. David points out how smart Jordie is to manipulate Shay into taking him and suggests turning on him at the next vote.: Immunity challenge: Players race through an obstacle course carrying a bag of sandbags. They must then toss sandbags into a bucket full of puzzle pieces to lower it to the ground, then use the pieces to complete a word puzzle. First player to finish the puzzle wins immunity.; Josh wins immunity. Josh hatches a plan to flush Mark’s idol and take out David, but Chrissy stubbornly wants Jordie out. Shay speaks to KJ in the hopes of rebuilding trust, but KJ feels humiliated by her betrayal at the challenge. However, they agree to set things aside for one vote and target Mark. Jordie and David discuss voting out Mark, but both are secretly targeting one another. Mark agrees to join the plan to vote out Jordie, but knows that the numbers may have turned on him. Shay accidentally reveals to Mark that he is receiving votes tonight, making him believe he may need to play an idol. At Tribal, Shay reflects on her decision to take Jordie and Josh on reward, and KJ and Chrissy reiterate their disappointment. David believes it was a master stroke by Jordie to get himself on the reward, while Jordie believes the focus should remain on the biggest threat in the game, Mark. Josh again expresses doubt that Mark has two idols, but agrees that even with just one he is a big threat. Mark knows that he has three opportunities left to play his idol(s) and it’s a matter of finding the right time to do so. Mark decides to play an idol for himself, negating three votes against him. Jordie and David each receive two votes, forcing a revote, and David is voted out 4-1, making him the seventh member of the jury.
196	22	"Episode 22"	Day 43	28 March 2022
Jordie confronts KJ about her vote for him at the last Tribal Council, and she apologizes and lies that she was just following orders. Jordie also continues trying to convince the others that Mark has another idol. Chrissy is proud of how long she’s lasted in the game hopes to continue using her social game to advance farther in the game. Mark feels safe in his alliance, but still doesn’t trust Josh since he voted out Sam and feels he may be too threatening to keep in the game. However, he plans to work with Josh in the short-term to prevent Jordie from winning immunities. Jordie feels that he has played the best game and hopes that Josh will continue secretly working with him.: Immunity challenge: Players race through an obstacle course to reach a chest full of puzzle pieces. They must then construct a vertical block puzzle. First to complete their puzzle wins immunity.; Josh wins immunity. Josh weighs his options between siding with Mark or Jordie, knowing that his decision will dictate the rest of his game. Jordie wants to target Mark again, knowing that he only has two more chances to play his idol. Mark knows he will be a target tonight, but hopes to save his idol and convince the others to vote for Jordie instead. Mark appeals to KJ to flip on Jordie, arguing that he is the biggest threat left in the game who isn’t loyal to her. Josh and Chrissy agree to Mark’s plan, but Mark secretly doubts that Josh is telling the truth. Jordie makes a final three deal with Josh and Chrissy to try and convince them to work with him tonight. Jordie pitches to Mark that they vote Shay in order to throw him off the scent and not play his idol, which makes Mark suspicious. At Tribal, Jordie comments on how difficult it is to gauge people’s loyalties this late in the game. He admits that he approached multiple people today with different plans in the hopes that one of them sticks. Chrissy says she remains unsure of the existence of a second idol, but ultimately believes that Mark doesn’t have one. Jordie stresses the importance of trust, but Josh points out that Jordie has targeted him multiple times while Mark and Chrissy have never broken his trust. Mark hopes that after tonight’s vote he’ll have a crew he can trust, but Jordie points out that Josh voted out Sam and may have compromised motives. Before the votes, Mark decides to play his idol, calling it the “Ghost of Jesse” that will knock Jordie out of the game. However, he receives no votes, and Jordie is voted out 5-1, becoming the eighth member of the jury.
197	23	"Episode 23"	Days 44–45	3 April 2022
Chrissy celebrates her top 5 finish and Mark’s decision to play his idol despite receiving no votes. She believes that her social game is strong and she will have a strong case to win if she reaches the top 3. Mark reflects on his poor idol play and is nervous about having zero protection from here on out, but resolves to fight hard to stay in the game. Josh believes Shay is the biggest physical threat left and hopes to beat her in today’s immunity challenge to vote her out. KJ knows she will be targeted next after Shay and hopes to get to the end with the other two women, though she worries that Chrissy is too close to Mark and Josh. Shay knows that her yoga skill set will help her in the final immunity challenge and resolves to win today just to stay alive.: Immunity challenge: Players drop a ball into a winding chute, then run to the bottom to catch it before it falls. At intervals they add more balls to the chute while keeping track of the others. Last player to keep all their balls in the chute without them falling to the ground wins immunity.; Shay wins immunity. She wants to vote out Josh, believing he will win if he reaches the end, and KJ agrees. They decide to approach Mark and pitch him on voting for Josh, arguing that he’ll have a better chance of winning final immunity if Josh is gone. However, Mark wants to keep Josh around as a shield in case Shay wins final immunity tomorrow. He and Josh want to target KJ to prevent an all-girl’s alliance, and they pitch Chrissy to join them. Chrissy is conflicted about the vote, feeling tight with Josh but knowing the jury might respect her move if she flips on him. Mark starts to get nervous that Chrissy isn’t with him, and contemplates voting for Josh in case he is the target. At Tribal, Josh reflects on how Shay’s immunity win has messed up everyone else’s plans for tonight. Mark says he feels vulnerable without his idols or the necklace. Chrissy explains how important it is to get to the end with the right people next to you, but also feels the pull of prior loyalties affecting her vote. KJ says that tonight’s vote could be an important resume-builder for somebody. Josh continues to espouse his loyalty to Mark and Chrissy and promises to take them both to the end if Shay loses tomorrow. Chrissy decides to flip her vote onto Mark, causing a tie between Josh and KJ. On the revote she flips back onto KJ, making her the ninth member of the jury.
198	24	"Episode 24"	Days 46–47	4 April 2022
Shay reflects on how hard she’s had to fight to stay alive and believes she is the biggest physical threat remaining. Josh believes he has the best strategic game and is proud of the social bonds he’s formed; he vows to beat Shay today to knock out his biggest threat to win the game. Chrissy feels more confident than she did on Day 1 and plans to rely on her social game to win over the jury, believing she has no blood on her hands that would make voters angry with her. Mark vows to win on behalf of Sam so that her sacrifice was not in vain, and hopes the jury will respect his idol plays. The four players arrive for their final immunity challenge, and receive phone calls from their loved ones back home to encourage them before competing.: Immunity challenge: Players hold onto pegs from a platform suspended over a waterfall. At intervals they must move down to lower pegs, suspending them further over the edge. Last player left standing wins immunity.; Shay wins final immunity. Shay knows she wants to bring Chrissy to the end with her, and talks with Chrissy about which of the boys to vote for. Mark pitches to Josh that they both vote for Chrissy in the hopes of forcing a tie at worst, but they tell Chrissy that they are voting for each other. Mark considers voting for Josh anyway, knowing that he is a threat to win and it’s his last chance to take him out. Chrissy agonizes about which of the boys she is going to have to betray. At Tribal, Shay says she knows that she wasn’t in anybody’s final 3 plans and that she had to win today to stay alive. Josh says that he and Mark know they are on the chopping block tonight. Chrissy is disappointed that her tight-knit alliance with Mark and Josh is being broken up. Josh hopes that his relationship with Chrissy is tight enough to rely on her tonight. However, Josh is voted out 3-1, making him the tenth member of the jury. Chrissy, Mark and Shay enjoy a breakfast feast before arriving for their final Tribal Council. Mark argues that he was strategic from day 1, taking risks and going after big threats while using Josh as a shield. Shay argues she has been a target since the merge began and still managed to fight her way to the end against all odds. Chrissy highlights her social play aligning with the stronger players to keep herself safe, and even splitting with her loved one to form new strong bonds. The jury questions whether Chrissy’s loyalty may have caused her to put her allies’ game ahead of her own. Shay is criticized for never having control in the game. Several jurors feel put-off by Mark’s ruthlessness, but respect the way he managed his threat level. The jury votes unanimously for Mark, making him the Sole Survivor in a 10-0-0 vote.

== Voting history ==
Tribal Phase (Days 1-24)

	Original Tribes				Post-Swap Tribes		Shuffled Tribes						Post-Kidnap Tribes			
Episode #	1	2	3	4	5	6	7	8	9	10 (Note: Unbeknownst to the Water tribe, they voted for a tribemate that the Blood tribe could steal. After the Water tribe voted, the Blood tribe voted for a player to join their tribe between any Water tribemate who received at least one vote in the first vote. KJ rejoined the game as a member of the Blood tribe.)			11	12 (Note: Both Blood and Water attended Tribal Council on Day 24. The person voted out of each tribe would compete against each other in a fire-making duel. The winner returned to their tribe and remained in the game, while the loser was eliminated. Ben and Mel were voted out. Mel won the duel and returned to Blood, eliminating Ben.)		
Day #	2	5	7	9	12	14	16	18	20	22			23	24		
Eliminated	Andy	Briana	Kate	Sophie (Note: On Day 9, instead of being voted out, Sophie was instructed that she just joined the Water tribe.)	Alex	Jay	Sandra	Sophie	Amy	Nina	Ben, Khanh & KJ	KJ	Croc	Mel	Ben	Ben
Votes	9–2–1	9–2	3–1–0 (Note: David played a hidden immunity idol on himself, therefore eight votes against him were negated.)	7–4	Quit (Note: Alex quit the game for concerns with his health. He quit at the Water Tribe's Tribal Council, with his departure cancelling that night's vote.)	4–3–0 (Note: Amy played a hidden immunity idol on herself, therefore three votes against her were negated.)	9–1	6–2–1	6–2–1	Evacuated	5–2–1	6–1–0	4–2–1	5–3	4–2	Challenge
Voter	Vote															
Mark	Andy	Chrissy					Sandra		Amy			KJ		Mel		
Chrissy	Andy	Briana						Sophie			Ben		Ben		Ben	
Shay	Andy	Briana					Sandra		Amy			Ben		Mel		
Josh	Alex	Briana					Sandra		Amy			KJ		Mel		
KJ	Andy	Briana						Sophie			Ben	Kidnap		Mel		
Jordie	Andy	Briana					Sandra		Amy			KJ		Mel		
David			Kate	Sophie		Sandra	Sandra		Mel			KJ		KJ		
Sam			Sandra	Sophie		Jay		Sophie			Ben		Croc		Ben	
Jordan			Kate	David		Jay	Sandra		Mel			KJ		KJ		
Michelle			~~David~~	Sophie		Jay		KJ			KJ		Croc		Khanh	
Jesse			~~David~~	Sophie		~~Amy~~		Sophie			Ben		Croc		Ben	
Mel	Andy	Briana					Sandra		Amy			KJ		KJ		Won
Khanh	Andy	Briana						Sophie			Ben	Spared	Ben		Ben	
Ben			Kate	David		Jay		Sophie			Khanh	Spared	Croc		Khanh	Lost
Croc			~~David~~	David		~~Amy~~		KJ			Khanh		Jesse			
Nina	Andy	Briana					Sandra		Amy							
Amy			~~David~~	Sophie		Sandra	Sandra		Jordan							
Sophie			~~David~~	David				Khanh								
Sandra			~~David~~	Sophie		~~Amy~~	David									
Jay			~~David~~	Sophie		Sandra										
Alex	Briana	Briana														
Kate			~~David~~													
Briana	Andy	Chrissy														
Andy	Alex															

Individual phase (Day 25–47)

	Merged tribe			Purgatory					Merged tribe							
Episode #	13	14	15	16	17		18		19	20	21		22	23		24
Day #	27	28	30	32	34		35	36	39	40	42		43	45		46
Eliminated	Khanh	Mel	Jesse	Shay (Note: After being voted out on Days 32-35, Shay, Jordie, KJ and Michelle learned that they would go to Purgatory and await a chance to return to the game. On Day 36 they competed in a challenge where the first three people to finish won a spot back in the game; Michelle finished last and was eliminated.)	Jordie	KJ	Michelle	Michelle	Jordan	Sam	Tie	David	Jordie	Tie	KJ	Josh
Vote	7–4–2	6–4–1–1	6–4–1	7–2–1	8–1	4–2–1–1	6–1	Challenge	4–2	5–3	2–2–0 (Note: Mark played a hidden immunity idol on himself, therefore three votes against him were negated.)	4–1	5–1	2–2–1	2–1	3–1
Voter	Vote															
Mark	Khanh	Michelle	Jesse	Shay	Jordie	KJ	Michelle		Immune (Note: KJ played an advantage allowing her to save three castaways from the tribal council vote on Day 38. Saved castaways immediately left tribal council and were unable to cast a vote or have votes cast against them.)	Jordie	David	David	Jordie	KJ	KJ	Josh
Chrissy	Mel	Michelle	Jesse	Shay	Jordie	David	Michelle		Immune	Jordie	Jordie	David	Jordie	Mark	KJ	Josh
Shay	Mel	Mel	Jesse	Mark	Purgatory			Won	Jordan	Sam	~~Mark~~	David	Jordie	Josh	Josh	Josh
Josh	Khanh	Mel	KJ	KJ	Jordie	KJ	Michelle		Immune	Sam	David	David	Jordie	KJ	None	Chrissy
KJ	Mel	Michelle	Josh	Shay	Jordie	Mark	Purgatory	Won	Jordan	Sam	~~Mark~~	Jordie	Jordie	Josh	None	
Jordie	Khanh	Michelle	Josh	Mark	Sam	Purgatory		Won	Jordan	Sam	~~Mark~~	None	Shay			
David	Khanh	Mel	Jesse	Shay	Jordie	Sam	Michelle		Jordan	Sam	Jordie	None				
Sam	Mel	Mel	Jesse	Shay	Jordie	KJ	Michelle		Jordie	Jordie						
Jordan	Khanh	Mel	Jesse	Shay	Jordie	KJ	Michelle		Jordie							
Michelle	Shay	Jordie	Josh	Shay	Jordie	Mark	David	Lost								
Jesse	Khanh	Mel	Josh													
Mel	Khanh	Josh														
Khanh	Shay															

Final vote
Episode #	24		
Day #	47		
Finalist	Mark	Chrissy	Shay
Vote	10–0–0		
Juror	Vote		
Josh	Mark		
KJ	Mark		
Jordie	Mark		
David	Mark		
Sam	Mark		
Jordan	Mark		
Michelle	Mark		
Jesse	Mark		
Mel	Mark		
Khanh	Mark		

== Reception ==
=== Ratings ===
Ratings data is from OzTAM and represents the viewership from the 5 largest Australian metropolitan centres (Sydney, Melbourne, Brisbane, Perth and Adelaide).

Week	Episode	Airdate	Timeslot	Overnight ratings		Consolidated ratings		Total ratings		Source
Week	Episode	Airdate	Timeslot	Viewers	Rank	Viewers	Rank	Viewers	Rank	Source
1	1	31 January 2022	Monday 7:30 pm	608,000	8	89,000	4	697,000	8	
1	2	1 February 2022	Tuesday 7:30 pm	492,000	11	99,000	2	591,000	10	
1	3	2 February 2022	Wednesday 7:30 pm	486,000	14	99,000	2	585,000	12	
2	4	6 February 2022	Sunday 7:30 pm	507,000	11	66,000		573,000	7	
2	5	7 February 2022	Monday 7:30 pm	500,000	13	69,000		569,000	11	
2	6	8 February 2022	Tuesday 7:30 pm	500,000	9	66,000		566,000	9	
3	7	13 February 2022	Sunday 7:30 pm	527,000	9	58,000		585,000	7	
3	8	14 February 2022	Monday 7:30 pm	496,000	12	51,000		547,000	11	
3	9	15 February 2022	Tuesday 7:30 pm	438,000	11	92,000		530,000	9	
4	10	20 February 2022	Sunday 7:30 pm	491,000	8	55,000		546,000	7	
4	11	21 February 2022	Monday 7:30 pm	479,000	12	54,000		533,000	12	
4	12	22 February 2022	Tuesday 7:30 pm	507,000	9	85,000		592,000	9	
5	13	27 February 2022	Sunday 7:30 pm	499,000	7	62,000		561,000		
5	14	28 February 2022	Monday 7:30 pm	463,000	14	75,000		538,000		
6	15	6 March 2022	Sunday 7:30 pm	480,000	7	66,000		546,000		
6	16	7 March 2022	Monday 7:30 pm	492,000	12	101,000		593,000		
7	17	13 March 2022	Sunday 7:30 pm	416,000	7	49,000		465,000		
7	18	14 March 2022	Monday 7:30 pm	502,000	13	84,000		586,000		
8	19	20 March 2022	Sunday 7:30 pm	466,000	7	70,000		536,000		
8	20	21 March 2022	Monday 7:30 pm	497,000	10	76,000		573,000		
9	21	27 March 2022	Sunday 7:30 pm	440,000	6	66,000		506,000		
9	22	28 March 2022	Monday 7:30 pm	451,000	11	98,000		549,000		
10	23	3 April 2022	Sunday 7:30 pm	465,000	6	56,000		521,000		
10	24	4 April 2022	Monday 7:30 pm	631,000	8	118,000		749,000		

== Controversies ==
=== Allegations of sexism from contestants ===
Following the airing of the final episode, runner-up Shayelle Lajoie recounted a notable incident during the Final Tribal Council in which her answers to the Jury questioning were met with constant interrupting from the male members of the Jury, particularly led by the 8th member of the Jury, Jordie Hansen. This "brutal" questioning did not air during the edited program. In addition to this, viewers have criticised and commented on the editing of the finale for not showing these moments, as well as criticised the season overall.
