= Samantha Gash =

Australian athlete

- Born: 14 October 1984 (age 42); Bendigo, Australia
- Occupations: Endurance athlete, social entrepreneur, motivational speaker
- Children: 1
- Website: hub.samanthagash.com

Samantha Gash (born 14 October 1984) is an Australian professional endurance athlete, social entrepreneur and motivational speaker. As an endurance athlete, Gash focuses on long distance expedition runs and adventure races. She is an ambassador to numerous organizations and events including World Vision, Lululemon Athletica, Run Melbourne and Travel Play Live.

== Career ==
=== Endurance running ===
In 2010 at the age of 25, Gash became the first woman and youngest person at the time to complete the Four Deserts Grandslam, four 250 km desert ultramarathons completed in four deserts around the world (the Atacama, Gobi, Sahara and Antarctic deserts) in one calendar year. At the time, only two male athletes had completed this challenge. Gash and three other ultra-marathoners were the subjects of the 2013 documentary film Desert Runners, which followed their journey throughout the four races and looked at the mindset of endurance athletes.

=== Social change projects ===
Gash has used her ability to run long and connect it to social change projects that link to female empowerment and access to education programs.

In 2012, Gash ran 379 km non-stop across Australia's Simpson Desert. She raised around $32,991 to fund a Save the Children education initiative in Australia.

In 2014, Gash collaborated with UK ultra-runner Mimi Anderson and together they founded Freedom Runners. It was an initiative that combined a fundraising and awareness campaign around the high cost of feminine hygiene products for women in Sub-Saharan Africa and its link to female absenteeism in school. Over 32 days, they ran 1,968 km across South Africa’s Freedom Trail and raised over $55K for a Save the Children program. They ran an average of 64 km every day and had no rest days.

In 2016, Gash became a World Vision Ambassador and collaborated with the not-for-profit on a concept to run from the West to East of India and use it as a means to explore the barriers to quality education. The campaign was called Run India, and raised over $150,000 to support six World Vision education focused programs across the country. Gash, as the solo runner supported by a crew, ran 3,253 km over 76 days, visiting 16 communities that World Vision support. This included visits to schools, a malnutrition clinic, a self defence program in the urban slums, economic development projects in the Himalayas and home visits in the desert.

=== Professional and speaking career ===
Gash worked as a lawyer at international law firm Baker & McKenzie for just under a year, later working in a boutique financial advisory firm owned by one of her friends (Wealth Enhancers) and in communications. She is now a motivational speaker on the speaker circuit, currently writing her first book with Macmillan Roaring Brook Press.

=== Other projects ===
Gash competed on the fourth season of Australian Survivor and returned for the seventh season, Blood V Water. She also competed on World's Toughest Race: Eco-Challenge Fiji, where she participated on Team Aussie Rescue.

== Personal life ==
Gash has a son, Harry.

== Awards ==
- Finalist – Women's Agenda Leadership Awards: Agenda Setter Category (2016)
- Delegate – Australia India Youth Dialogue Conference (2016)
- Finalist – Women's Agenda Leadership Awards: Inspirational Leaders Category (2013)
- Nominated – Pride of Australia Medal

== Filmography ==
Year	Title	Genre	Role	Notes
2013	Desert Runners	Film	Herself	Documentary
2017	Australian Survivor (season 4)	Television	Contestant	Eliminated; 19th place
2020	World's Toughest Race: Eco-Challenge Fiji	Television	Competitor	Team Aussie Rescue
2022	Australian Survivor: Blood V Water	Television	Contestant	Eliminated; 8th place
