= List of Australian Survivor episodes =

Australian Survivor is an Australian reality television show, a derivative of the Swedish program, Expedition Robinson. It has been broadcast on Nine Network and Seven Network and is currently broadcast on Network 10. It has been hosted by Lincoln Howes, Ian "Dicko" Dickson and Jonathan LaPaglia. The show is currently hosted by previous winner David Genat.

The first season premiered on 13 February 2002 on Nine Network but was canceled after the initial airing. The show returned on Seven Network in 2006 for a celebrity season, Celebrity Survivor: Vanuatu. The show did not return after this airing. Network Ten revealed at their upfronts that they would be commissioning a revival of Australian Survivor to air in mid-late 2016. Since then, it has aired twelve seasons. The series is currently airing its fourteenth season, Australian Survivor: Redemption.

== Series overview ==
Series	Subtitle	Location	Original Tribes	Host	Grand Prize	Days	Episodes	Originally released			Winner	Runner(s)–up	Final vote
Series	Subtitle	Location	Original Tribes	Host	Grand Prize	Days	Episodes	First released	Last released	Network	Winner	Runner(s)–up	Final vote
1	—N/a	Whaler's Way, Eyre Peninsula, South Australia	Two tribes of eight new players	Lincoln Howes	A$500,000 & Ford V6; Escape	39	13	13 February 2002	15 May 2002	Nine Network	Rob Dickson	Sciona Browne	5–2
2	Celebrity: Vanuatu	Efate, Shefa, Vanuatu	Two tribes of six celebrities; split by gender, with one of the opposite gender	Ian Dickson	A$100,000 (for Charity)	25	12	17 August 2006	2 November 2006	Seven Network	Guy Leech	Justin Melvey	3–2
3	—N/a	Upolu, Samoa	Three tribes of eight new players	Jonathan LaPaglia	A$500,000	55	26	21 August 2016	25 October 2016	Network 10	Kristie Bennett	Lee Carseldine	8–1
4	—N/a	Upolu, Samoa	Two tribes of twelve new players	Jonathan LaPaglia	A$500,000	55	26	30 July 2017	10 October 2017	Network 10	Jericho Malabonga	Tara Pitt	6–3
5	Champions V Contenders	Savusavu, Fiji	Two tribes of twelve divided by status: "Champions" & "Contenders"	Jonathan LaPaglia	A$500,000	50	24	1 August 2018	9 October 2018	Network 10	Shane Gould	Sharn Coombes	5–4
6	Champions V Contenders II	Savusavu, Fiji	Two tribes of twelve divided by status: "Champions" & "Contenders"	Jonathan LaPaglia	A$500,000	50	24	24 July 2019	17 September 2019	Network 10	Pia Miranda	Baden Gilbert	9–0
7	All Stars	Savusavu, Fiji	Two tribes of twelve returning players	Jonathan LaPaglia	A$500,000	50	24	3 February 2020	30 March 2020	Network 10	David Genat	Sharn Coombes	8–1
8	Brains V Brawn	Cloncurry, Queensland	Two tribes of twelve divided by characteristic: "Brains" & "Brawn"	Jonathan LaPaglia	A$500,000	48	24	18 July 2021	12 September 2021	Network 10	Hayley Leake	George Mladenov	7–2
9	Blood V Water	Charters Towers, Queensland	Twelve pairs of pre-existing relationships, including new and returning players, split into two tribes of twelve.	Jonathan LaPaglia	A$500,000	47	24	31 January 2022	4 April 2022	Network 10	Mark Wales	Shayelle "Shay" Lajoie & Chrissy Zaremba	10–0–0
10	Heroes V Villains	Upolu, Samoa	13 new and 11 returning players, divided into two tribes of twelve by reputation: "heroes" vs. "villains" traits.	Jonathan LaPaglia	A$500,000	47	24	30 January 2023	27 March 2023	Network 10	Liz Parnov	Gerry Geltch & Matt Sharp	7–0–0
11	Titans V Rebels	Upolu, Samoa	Two tribes of twelve, divided by approach to life: "Titans" & "Rebels"	Jonathan LaPaglia	A$500,000	47	24	29 January 2024	19 March 2024	Network 10	Feras Basal	Caroline Courtis	9–0
12	Brains V Brawn II	Upolu, Samoa	Two tribes of twelve divided by characteristic: "Brains" & "Brawn"	Jonathan LaPaglia	A$500,000	47	24	17 February 2025	14 April 2025	Network 10	Myles Kuah	Kaelan Lockhart	7–1
13	Australia V The World	Upolu, Samoa	Two tribes of seven, split by originating Survivor series: Australian Survivors & other editions of Survivor.	Jonathan LaPaglia	A$250,000	16	10	17 August 2025	7 September 2025	Network 10	Parvati Shallow	Luke Toki & Janine Allis	6–1–0
14	Redemption	Upolu, Samoa	Two tribes of twelve, including four returning players	David Genat	A$500,000	45	24	23 February 2026	14 April 2026	Network 10	Caleb Beeby	Jackson Goonrey	6–3

== Episodes ==
=== Season 1 (Season 1, 2002) ===
No. overall	No. in season	Title	Timeline	Original release date
1	1	"Journey To Whaler's Way"	Days 1-3	13 February 2002
2	2	"Violent Weather and Violent People"	Days 4-6	20 February 2002
3	3	" The Losing Streak"	Days 7-9	27 February 2002
4	4	"The Struggle of Both Tribes"	Days 10-12	6 March 2002
5	5	"It's Just Too Hard!"	Days 13-15	13 March 2002
6	6	"This Game is Way Different Then it Looks"	Days 16-18	20 March 2002
7	7	"It's Time to Merge"	Days 19-21	3 April 2002
8	8	"Pick Off"	Days 22-24	10 April 2002
9	9	"I Just Feel So Bad"	Days 25-27	17 April 2002
10	10	"He's a Threat, She's A Threat, We're all Threats!"	Days 28-30	28 April 2002
11	11	"Cockiness Comes to an End"	Days 31-33	1 May 2002
12	12	"Who's the Odd Man Out?"	Days 34-35	8 May 2002
13	13	"Finale/Reunion"	Days 36-39	15 May 2002

=== Celebrity Survivor: Vanuatu (Season 2, 2006) ===
No. overall	No. in season	Title	Timeline	Original release date
14	1	"Episode 1"	Days 1-3	17 August 2006
15	2	"Episode 2"	Days 4-5	24 August 2006
16	3	"Episode 3"	Days 6-7	31 August 2006
17	4	"Episode 4"	Days 8-9	7 September 2006
18	5	"Episode 5"	Days 10-11	14 September 2006
19	6	"Episode 6"	Days 12-13	21 September 2006
20	7	"Episode 7"	Days 14-15	28 September 2006
21	8	"Episode 8"	Days 16-17	5 October 2006
22	9	"Episode 9"	Days 18-19	12 October 2006
23	10	"Episode 10"	Days 20-21	19 October 2006
24	11	"Episode 11"	Days 22-23	26 October 2006
25	12	"Episode 12"	Days 24-25	2 November 2006

=== Season 3 (Season 3, 2016) ===
No. overall	No. in season	Title	Timeline	Original release date
26	1	" I Always Wanted to Play the Villain"	Days 1–2	21 August 2016
27	2	" Paranoia Will Do Crazy Things To You"	Days 3-5	22 August 2016
28	3	" A Little Jaunty Rhyme"	Days 6-8	28 August 2016
29	4	" A Real Mad Moral Dilemma"	Days 9-10	29 August 2016
30	5	" Flippity"	Days 11-12	30 August 2016
31	6	" Welcome To Our Electric Box Of Crayons"	Days 13-14	4 September 2016
32	7	" Revenge Is On The Cards"	Days 15-17	5 September 2016
33	8	" Game Changing Advantage"	Days 18-19	6 September 2016
34	9	" Divided"	Days 20-21	11 September 2016
35	10	" I Have A Ferrari In My Brain"	Days 22-23	12 September 2016
36	11	" The Chicken Debate"	Days 24-25	13 September 2016
37	12	" No Such Thing As A Sure Thing"	Days 26-27	18 September 2016
38	13	" Disbelief And Relief"	Days 28-29	19 September 2016
39	14	" Revenge, Redemption, And Justice"	Days 30-31	20 September 2016
40	15	" Sunaapu Surveillance"	Days 32-33	25 September 2016
41	16	" All Hell Has Broken Loose"	Days 34-35	26 September 2016
42	17	" A State Of Chaos And Confusion"	Days 36-37	27 September 2016
43	18	" Exiled"	Days 38-39	3 October 2016
44	19	" All Guns Blazing"	Days 40-41	4 October 2016
45	20	" The Game Is On Fire"	Days 42-43	9 October 2016
46	21	" This Is The Door Exploding"	Days 44-45	10 October 2016
47	22	" Don't Mess With Me"	Days 46-47	16 October 2016
48	23	" The New Alliance"	Days 48-49	17 October 2016
49	24	" Two Seconds"	Days 50-51	23 October 2016
50	25	" Desperation Is A Stinky Cologne"	Days 52-53	24 October 2016
51	26	" Take It All In"	Days 54-55	25 October 2016

=== Season 4 (Season 4, 2017) ===
No. overall	No. in season	Title	Timeline	Original release date
52	1	"Welcome to Survivor"	Days 1-3	30 July 2017
53	2	"The Chicken Idol"	Days 4-6	31 July 2017
54	3	"The Other Nail in Her Coffin"	Days 6-9	1 August 2017
55	4	"Cookie Monster"	Days 9-11	6 August 2017
56	5	"Line in the Sand"	Days 12-13	7 August 2017
57	6	"Put Both Their Necks on the Block & Start Chopping"	Days 14-16	13 August 2017
58	7	"Spontaneous and Bombastic"	Days 16-18	14 August 2017
59	8	"At Least I Can Do My Nails"	Days 19-20	20 August 2017
60	9	"Yogapants and Sideshow Bob"	Days 21-22	21 August 2017
61	10	"Opening Up Shop"	Days 22-24	27 August 2017
62	11	"Deep in the Mangroves"	Days 25-26	28 August 2017
63	12	"The King of the Jungle"	Days 27-28	3 September 2017
64	13	"Hanging on the Edge of a Cliff With My Nails"	Days 29-30	4 September 2017
65	14	"Absolute Chaos"	Days 31-32	10 September 2017
66	15	"One Night Stand"	Days 33-34	11 September 2017
67	16	"This is Where the War Really Begins"	Days 35-36	17 September 2017
68	17	"Jamgate"	Days 37-38	18 September 2017
69	18	"The Champagne Alliance"	TBA	19 September 2017
70	19	"Desperate Times, Desperate Measures"	TBA	24 September 2017
71	20	"Survivor Charades"	TBA	25 September 2017
72	21	"Winning Her Over with Some Sweet Lollies"	TBA	26 September 2017
73	22	"Happy Days"	TBA	2 October 2017
74	23	"Conquered"	TBA	3 October 2017
75	24	"Day 50"	TBA	8 October 2017
76	25	"Civilized Scrambling"	TBA	9 October 2017
77	26	"The Wet, the Cold, the Wind, and the Dark"	TBA	10 October 2017
78	27	"Reunion Special"	TBA	10 October 2017

=== Champions V Contenders (Season 5, 2018) ===
No. overall	No. in season	Title	Timeline	Original release date
79	1	"Episode 1"	Days 1-2	1 August 2018
80	2	"Episode 2"	Days 3-5	2 August 2018
81	3	"Episode 3"	Days 6-8	6 August 2018
82	4	"Episode 4"	Days 9-11	7 August 2018
83	5	"Episode 5"	Days 12-13	8 August 2018
84	6	"Episode 6"	Days 14-16	9 August 2018
85	7	"Episode 7"	Days 17-18	13 August 2018
86	8	"Episode 8"	Days 19-20	14 August 2018
87	9	"Episode 9"	Days 21-22	20 August 2018
88	10	"Episode 10"	Days 23-24	21 August 2018
89	11	"Episode 11"	Days 25-26	27 August 2018
90	12	"Episode 12"	Days 27-28	28 August 2018
91	13	"Episode 13"	Days 29-30	3 September 2018
92	14	"Episode 14"	Days 31-32	4 September 2018
93	15	"Episode 15"	Day 33	10 September 2018
94	16	"Episode 16"	Days 34-35	11 September 2018
95	17	"Episode 17"	Days 36-37	17 September 2018
96	18	"Episode 18"	Days 38-39	18 September 2018
97	19	"Episode 19"	Day 40	24 September 2018
98	20	"Episode 20"	Days 41-42	25 September 2018
99	21	"Episode 21"	Days 43-44	1 October 2018
100	22	"Episode 22"	Days 45-46	2 October 2018
101	23	"Episode 23"	Days 47-48	8 October 2018
102	24	"Episode 24"	Days 49-50	9 October 2018

=== Champions V Contenders II (Season 6, 2019) ===
No. overall	No. in season	Title	Timeline	Original release date
103	1	"Episode 1"	Days 1—2	24 July 2019
104	2	"Episode 2"	Days 3—5	25 July 2019
105	3	"Episode 3"	Days 6—7	28 July 2019
106	4	"Episode 4"	Days 8—10	29 July 2019
107	5	"Episode 5"	Days 11—12	30 July 2019
108	6	"Episode 6"	Days 13—14	4 August 2019
109	7	"Episode 7"	Days 15—16	5 August 2019
110	8	"Episode 8"	Days 17—18	6 August 2019
111	9	"Episode 9"	Day 19—20	11 August 2019
112	10	"Episode 10"	Day 21—22	12 August 2019
113	11	"Episode 11"	Day 23—24	13 August 2019
114	12	"Episode 12"	Day 25—26	18 August 2019
115	13	"Episode 13"	Day 27—28	19 August 2019
116	14	"Episode 14"	Day 29—30	20 August 2019
117	15	"Episode 15"	Day 31—32	25 August 2019
118	16	"Episode 16"	Day 33—34	26 August 2019
119	17	"Episode 17"	Day 35—36	27 August 2019
120	18	"Episode 18"	Day 37—38	1 September 2019
121	19	"Episode 19"	Day 39—40	2 September 2019
122	20	"Episode 20"	Day 41—42	3 September 2019
123	21	"Episode 21"	Days 43—44	9 September 2019
124	22	"Episode 22"	Days 45—46	10 September 2019
125	23	"Episode 23"	Days 47	16 September 2019
126	24	"Episode 24"	Days 48—50	17 September 2019

=== All Stars (Season 7, 2020) ===
No. overall	No. in season	Title	Timeline	Original release date
127	1	"Episode 1"	Days 1—2	3 February 2020
128	2	"Episode 2"	Days 3—5	4 February 2020
129	3	"Episode 3"	Days 6—7	5 February 2020
130	4	"Episode 4"	Days 8—9	10 February 2020
131	5	"Episode 5"	Days 10—12	11 February 2020
132	6	"Episode 6"	Days 13—14	12 February 2020
133	7	"Episode 7"	Days 15—16	17 February 2020
134	8	"Episode 8"	Days 17—18	18 February 2020
135	9	"Episode 9"	Days 19—20	19 February 2020
136	10	"Episode 10"	Days 21—22	24 February 2020
137	11	"Episode 11"	Days 23—24	25 February 2020
138	12	"Episode 12"	Days 25—26	26 February 2020
139	13	"Episode 13"	Days 27—28	2 March 2020
140	14	"Episode 14"	Days 29—30	3 March 2020
141	15	"Episode 15"	Days 31—32	4 March 2020
142	16	"Episode 16"	Days 33—34	9 March 2020
143	17	"Episode 17"	Days 35—36	10 March 2020
144	18	"Episode 18"	Days 37—38	11 March 2020
145	19	"Episode 19"	Days 39—40	16 March 2020
146	20	"Episode 20"	Days 41—42	17 March 2020
147	21	"Episode 21"	Days 43—44	18 March 2020
148	22	"Episode 22"	Days 45—46	23 March 2020
149	23	"Episode 23"	Days 47	24 March 2020
150	24	"Episode 24"	Days 48—50	30 March 2020

=== Brains V Brawn (Season 8, 2021) ===
No. overall	No. in season	Title	Timeline	Original release date
151	1	"Episode 1"	Days 1–2	18 July 2021
152	2	"Episode 2"	Days 3–5	19 July 2021
153	3	"Episode 3"	Days 6–7	20 July 2021
154	4	"Episode 4"	Days 8–9	25 July 2021
155	5	"Episode 5"	Days 10–12	26 July 2021
156	6	"Episode 6"	Days 13–14	27 July 2021
157	7	"Episode 7"	Days 15–16	1 August 2021
158	8	"Episode 8"	Days 17–18	2 August 2021
159	9	"Episode 9"	Day 19	3 August 2021
160	10	"Episode 10"	Days 20–21	8 August 2021
161	11	"Episode 11"	Days 22–23	9 August 2021
162	12	"Episode 12"	Days 24–25	10 August 2021
163	13	"Episode 13"	Days 26–27	15 August 2021
164	14	"Episode 14"	Days 28–29	16 August 2021
165	15	"Episode 15"	Days 30–31	17 August 2021
166	16	"Episode 16"	Days 32–33	22 August 2021
167	17	"Episode 17"	Days 34–35	23 August 2021
168	18	"Episode 18"	Days 36–37	24 August 2021
169	19	"Episode 19"	Days 38–39	29 August 2021
170	20	"Episode 20"	Days 40–41	30 August 2021
171	21	"Episode 21"	Days 42–43	31 August 2021
172	22	"Episode 22"	Day 44	5 September 2021
173	23	"Episode 23"	Day 45	6 September 2021
174	24	"Episode 24"	Days 46–48	12 September 2021

=== Blood V Water (Season 9, 2022) ===
No. overall	No. in season	Title	Timeline	Original release date
175	1	"Episode 1"	Days 1–2	31 January 2022
176	2	"Episode 2"	Days 3–5	1 February 2022
177	3	"Episode 3"	Days 6–7	2 February 2022
178	4	"Episode 4"	Days 8–9	6 February 2022
179	5	"Episode 5"	Days 10–12	7 February 2022
180	6	"Episode 6"	Days 13–14	8 February 2022
181	7	"Episode 7"	Days 15–16	13 February 2022
182	8	"Episode 8"	Days 17–18	14 February 2022
183	9	"Episode 9"	Days 19–20	15 February 2022
184	10	"Episode 10"	Days 21–22	20 February 2022
185	11	"Episode 11"	Day 23	21 February 2022
186	12	"Episode 12"	Days 24–25	22 February 2022
187	13	"Episode 13"	Days 26–27	27 February 2022
188	14	"Episode 14"	Day 28	28 February 2022
189	15	"Episode 15"	Days 29–30	6 March 2022
190	16	"Episode 16"	Days 31–32	7 March 2022
191	17	"Episode 17"	Days 33–34	13 March 2022
192	18	"Episode 18"	Days 35–36	14 March 2022
193	19	"Episode 19"	Days 37–39	20 March 2022
194	20	"Episode 20"	Day 40	21 March 2022
195	21	"Episode 21"	Days 41–42	27 March 2022
196	22	"Episode 22"	Day 43	28 March 2022
197	23	"Episode 23"	Days 44–45	3 April 2022
198	24	"Episode 24"	Days 46–47	4 April 2022

=== Heroes V Villains (Season 10, 2023) ===
No. overall	No. in season	Title	Timeline	Original release date
199	1	"Episode 1"	Days 1–2	30 January 2023
200	2	"Episode 2"	Days 3–5	31 January 2023
201	3	"Episode 3"	Days 6–7	1 February 2023
202	4	"Episode 4"	Days 8–9	5 February 2023
203	5	"Episode 5"	Days 10–12	6 February 2023
204	6	"Episode 6"	Days 13–14	7 February 2023
205	7	"Episode 7"	Day 15	12 February 2023
206	8	"Episode 8"	Days 16–17	13 February 2023
207	9	"Episode 9"	Days 18–19	14 February 2023
208	10	"Episode 10"	Days 20–21	19 February 2023
209	11	"Episode 11"	Day 22	20 February 2023
210	12	"Episode 12"	Days 23–25	21 February 2023
211	13	"Episode 13"	Days 26–27	26 February 2023
212	14	"Episode 14"	Days 28–29	27 February 2023
213	15	"Episode 15"	Days 30–31	28 February 2023
214	16	"Episode 16"	Days 32–33	5 March 2023
215	17	"Episode 17"	Days 34–35	6 March 2023
216	18	"Episode 18"	Days 36–37	7 March 2023
217	19	"Episode 19"	Days 38–39	12 March 2023
218	20	"Episode 20"	Days 40–41	13 March 2023
219	21	"Episode 21"	Day 42	19 March 2023
220	22	"Episode 22"	Days 43–44	20 March 2023
221	23	"Episode 23"	Day 45	26 March 2023
222	24	"Episode 24"	Days 46–47	27 March 2023

=== Titans V Rebels (Season 11, 2024) ===
No. overall	No. in season	Title	Timeline	Original release date
223	1	"We've All Seen This Movie"	Days 1–2	29 January 2024
224	2	"The Invisible Hand"	Days 3–5	30 January 2024
225	3	"The Cuddle Club"	Days 6–7	31 January 2024
226	4	"B is for Blindside"	Days 8–9	4 February 2024
227	5	"Where Angels Fear to Tread"	Days 10–12	5 February 2024
228	6	"The Saboteur"	Days 13–14	6 February 2024
229	7	"Get, Or Get Got"	Days 15–16	11 February 2024
230	8	"The Divorce"	Days 17–18	12 February 2024
231	9	"Excited For The Actions"	Days 19–20	13 February 2024
232	10	"Bad Hair Day"	Day 21	18 February 2024
233	11	"It's Not Sarong, It's So Right"	Days 22–23	19 February 2024
234	12	"To Infinity And Beyond"	Days 24–25	20 February 2024
235	13	"Revenge Is a Dish Best Served Russian"	Days 26–27	25 February 2024
236	14	"A Line in the Sand"	Days 28–29	26 February 2024
237	15	"Master and Apprentice"	Days 30–31	27 February 2024
238	16	"The Wedge"	Days 32–33	3 March 2024
239	17	"Floater or Flexible"	Days 34–35	4 March 2024
240	18	"The Best Actor Award"	Days 36–37	5 March 2024
241	19	"How do Rainbows Work?"	Days 38–39	10 March 2024
242	20	"Pride & Paranoia"	Days 40–41	11 March 2024
243	21	"How to Build A Resume"	Day 42	12 March 2024
244	22	"Dilemmas of the End"	Days 43–44	17 March 2024
245	23	"A Nation of One"	Day 45	18 March 2024
246	24	"The Fire That I Can Bring"	Days 46–47	19 March 2024

=== Brains V Brawn II (Season 12, 2025) ===
No. overall	No. in season	Title	Timeline	Original release date
247	1	"Premiere"	Days 1–2	17 February 2025
248	2	"The Praying Mantis"	Days 3–5	18 February 2025
249	3	"Stoic"	Days 6–7	19 February 2025
250	4	"Perplexed Dimension"	Days 8–9	23 February 2025
251	5	"Bomb Squad!"	Days 10–12	24 February 2025
252	6	"The Pest Problem"	Days 13–14	25 February 2025
253	7	"A Date with JLP"	Days 15–16	2 March 2025
254	8	"Maggot in the Rice"	Day 18	3 March 2025
255	9	"Hostages"	Day 19	4 March 2025
256	10	"The Vault"	Days 20–21	9 March 2025
257	11	"The Strong-Arm"	Days 22–23	10 March 2025
258	12	"Just What the Doctor Ordered"	Days 24–25	11 March 2025
259	13	"Vengeance"	Days 26–28	16 March 2025
260	14	"The Buddy System"	Day 29	17 March 2025
261	15	"The Rat King"	Days 30-31	18 March 2025
262	16	"Pickled"	Days 32-33	23 March 2025
263	17	"G-R-I-M"	Days 34-35	24 March 2025
264	18	"Operation: Shut Your Pie Hole"	Days 35-37	25 March 2025
265	19	"The Magic Number"	Days 38-39	30 March 2025
266	20	"The Reaper is Coming"	Days 40-41	31 March 2025
267	21	"House of Cards"	Days 42-43	6 April 2025
268	22	"Polarising the Outcome"	Day 44	7 April 2025
269	23	"Fired Up!"	Day 45	13 April 2025
270	24	"Go with your Heart"	Days 46-47	14 April 2025

=== Australia V The World (Season 13, 2025) ===
No. overall	No. in season	Title	Timeline	Original release date
271	1	"The Multiverse"	Days 1–2	17 August 2025
272	2	"Kings and Queens and Gods"	Day 3	18 August 2025
273	3	"An Eye for An Eye"	Days 4–5	19 August 2025
274	4	"When the Other Shoe Drops"	Day 6	24 August 2025
275	5	"Piss or Get Off the Pot"	Days 7–8	25 August 2025
276	6	"My Fire Breathing Dragon"	Day 9	26 August 2025
277	7	"Tastes Like Victory"	Days 10–11	31 August 2025
278	8	"The Weirdness Train"	Day 12	1 September 2025
279	9	"It’s About Endgame"	Days 13–14	2 September 2025
280	10	"Ashes to Ashes"	Days 15–16	7 September 2025

=== Redemption (Season 14, 2026) ===
No. overall	No. in season	Title	Timeline	Original release date
281	1	"I Forgot Your Name"	Days 1–2	23 February 2026
282	2	"Ghosts"	Days 3–5	24 February 2026
283	3	"In the Middle of Night"	Days 6–7	25 February 2026
284	4	"Piece of Cake"	Days 8–9	2 March 2026
285	5	"Urge to Do Terrible Things"	Days 10–11	3 March 2026
286	6	"Operation Snuff the Weasel"	Days 12–13	4 March 2026
287	7	"Leopards Don't Change Their Spots"	Days 14–15	9 March 2026
288	8	"I Want His Pants"	Days 16–17	10 March 2026
289	9	"Don't Talk Dirty to Me"	Day 18	11 March 2026
290	10	"An Oscar Winning Performance"	Days 19–20	15 March 2026
291	11	"Draw Up the Divorce Papers"	Day 21	16 March 2026
292	12	"Sitting Little Wet Sad Ducks"	Days 22–24	18 March 2026
293	13	"Shake the Game"	Days 25–26	22 March 2026
294	14	"The Soul Collector"	Day 27–28	23 March 2026
295	15	"Like Venomous Snakes"	Days 29–30	24 March 2026
296	16	"Arts and Crafts"	Days 31–32	29 March 2026
297	17	"Wimp"	Days 33–34	30 March 2026
298	18	"On the Rocks"	Days 35–36	1 April 2026
299	19	"Sold the Dream"	Days 37–38	5 April 2026
300	20	"Maggots"	Days 39–40	6 April 2026
301	21	"Half and Half"	Day 41	7 April 2026
302	22	"Build a Raft"	Days 42–43	12 April 2026
303	23	"You Know I've Got You"	Day 44	13 April 2026
304	24	"Redemption"	Day 45	14 April 2026

== Broadcast and ratings ==
#	Network	Episodes	Timeslot	Premiere			Finale					Reunion		Average Viewers	Average Rank	Ref
#	Network	Episodes	Timeslot	Date	Viewers	Rank	Date	Viewers Finale	Rank	Viewers Winner Reveal	Rank	Viewers	Rank	Average Viewers	Average Rank	Ref
1	9	13 (Note: In addition to the 13 episodes, two specials aired – a casting special and a behind the scenes special)	Wednesday 8:30 pm	13 February 2002	—N/a (Note: No Ratings Information is available for these seasons)		15 May 2002	—N/a								
2	7	12	Thursday 8:30 pm	17 August 2006	—N/a		2 November 2006	—N/a				—N/a (Note: No Reunion Show was held.)		—N/a		
3	Ten	26	Sunday, Monday & Tuesday 7:30 pm (Note: The program occasionally deviates from these timeslots - check the ratings table on each season's page for specific timeslots for each episode.)	21 August 2016	857,000; 848,000 (Note: The premiere was coded into two programs - titled "Launch" and “Tribal Council". Two sets of ratings were produced.)	5; 6	25 October 2016	914,000	7	1,172,000	1	—N/a		786,000	10	
4	Ten	26	Sunday, Monday & Tuesday 7:30 pm	30 July 2017	691,000	8	10 October 2017	825,000	8	943,000	2	613,000	13	698,000	10	
5	Ten	24	Monday & Tuesday 7:30 pm	1 August 2018	779,000	7	9 October 2018	914,000	5	922,000	4	667,000	13	765,000	9	
6	10 (Note: No network change. “Network Ten" rebranded as "Network 10" in late 2018.)	24	Sunday, Monday & Tuesday 7:30 pm	24 July 2019	925,000	2	17 September 2019	968,000	4	1,079,000	1	—N/a		840,000	6	
7	10	24	Monday, Tuesday & Wednesday 7:30 pm	3 February 2020	715,000	8	30 March 2020	908,000	9	1,034,000	6	677,000	14	733,000	9	
8	10	24	Sunday, Monday & Tuesday 7:30 pm	18 July 2021	824,000	4	12 September 2021	826,000	7	991,000	6	—N/a		752,000	8	
9	10	24	Sunday, Monday & Tuesday 7:30 pm	31 January 2022	697,000	8	4 April 2022	631,000	11	749,000	8	—N/a		568,000	9	
10	10	24	Sunday, Monday & Tuesday 7:30 pm	30 January 2023	536,000	12	27 March 2023	644,000	9	699,000	6	—N/a		557,000	8	
11 (Note: In 2024, the OzTAM system by which Television ratings are recorded changed, with the rank now determined by a program's reach (viewers nationally who watch a minute of a program) rather than by average viewership over the length of the program. Both Reach and Average viewership are recorded. For consistency, the average viewership is used in this table.)	10	24	Sunday, Monday & Tuesday 7:30 pm	29 January 2024	857,000	13	19 March 2024	877,000	6	—N/a (Note: The finale was only coded into one program - unlike past seasons with a separate "Winner Revealed" Segment. Hence, only one set of ratings was produced.)		—N/a		802,000	8	
12	10	24	Sunday 7:00 pm, Monday & Tuesday 7:30 pm	17 February 2025	836,000	9	14 April 2025	932,000	5	—N/a		—N/a		704,000	8	
13	10	10	Sunday 7:00 pm, Monday & Tuesday 7:30 pm	17 August 2025	906,000	7	7 September 2025	862,000	6	—N/a		—N/a		840,000	8	
14	10	24	Sunday 7:00 pm & Monday, Tuesday, Wednesday 7:30 pm	23 February 2026	732,000	11	14 April 2026	593,000	14	—N/a		355,000	21	634,000	13	
