= Australian Survivor =

Television series based on the reality show Survivor

- Also known as: Survivor
- Genre: Reality competition
- Created by: Charlie Parsons
- Based on: Expedition Robinson/Survivor by Charlie Parsons
- Presented by: Lincoln Howes; Ian "Dicko" Dickson; Jonathan LaPaglia; David Genat
- Starring: Australian Survivor contestants
- Theme music composer: Jack Robin (2002); Jay Stewart (2006); Russ Landau (2016–present)
- Country of origin: Australia
- Original language: English
- No. of seasons: 14
- No. of episodes: 304 (and 2 specials) (list of episodes)

Production
- Executive producers: Stephen Peters (2002); David Mason (2006); Amelia Fisk (2016–2020, 2022); Tim Toni (2016–2017); Keely Sonntag (2019–2021); Tim Ali (2023); David Forster (2022–2025); Phoebe McMahon (2025–present)
- Production location: see below
- Running time: 60 minutes (inc. adverts) (2002, 2006); 70-90 minutes (inc. adverts) (2016–present)
- Production companies: Castaway Television (2002–present); Endemol Shine Australia (2016–present)

Original release
- Network: Nine Network
- Release: 3 February – 15 May 2002
- Network: Seven Network
- Release: 17 August – 2 November 2006
- Network: Network 10
- Release: 21 August 2016 – present

Related
- Companion shows: Jury Villa; Talking Tribal; Drop Your Buffs; Related: American Survivor; International versions

Australian Survivor (occasionally branded and marketed simply as Survivor) is an Australian adventure reality game show based on the international Survivor format. Following the premise of other versions of the Survivor format, the show features a group of contestants, referred to as "castaways" as they are marooned in an isolated location. The castaways must provide food, water, fire, and shelter for themselves. The contestants compete in various challenges for rewards and immunity from elimination. The contestants are progressively eliminated from the game as they are voted out of the game by their fellow castaways. The final castaway remaining is awarded the title of "Sole Survivor" and the grand prize of A$500,000.

The series first aired in 2002 on the Nine Network, who as of 2023, also hold the first-run Australian broadcast rights to the American edition of Survivor. In 2006, a celebrity edition aired on the Seven Network. Both iterations of the series only lasted one season due to low ratings.

In November 2015, Network Ten announced at its network upfronts that it would be reviving the series in 2016. The series commenced airing on 21 August 2016, with Jonathan LaPaglia hosting. Unlike its predecessors, Network Ten renewed the series for a 2017 season, and the series has continued successfully, with seasons airing yearly. Australian Survivor most recently aired its fourteenth and twelfth seasons on Network 10, titled Redemption, set on the island of Upolu in Samoa. It was the first season hosted by former contestant David Genat after Network 10 confirmed in June 2025 that LaPaglia would depart as host after Australia V The World .

In 2027, the show will air its fifteenth season, "Rivals", and was filmed in Malaysia.

== Format ==
The show follows the same general format as the other editions of Survivor. To begin, the players are split into two or three tribes and taken to a remote, isolated location. They are forced to live off the land with meagre supplies for several weeks. Frequent physical and mental challenges are used to pit the tribes against each other for rewards such as food, luxuries, or for immunity, forcing the other tribe to attend Tribal Council, where they must vote one of their tribemates out of the game by secret ballot.

About halfway through the game, the tribes are merged into a single tribe, and challenges are on an individual basis; winning immunity prevents that player from being voted out. Most players voted out during this stage become members of the Tribal Council Jury. When only two or three players remain, the Final Tribal Council is held. The finalists plead their case to the Jury about why they should win the game. The jurors then have the opportunity to interrogate the finalists before casting their vote for which finalist should be awarded the title of Sole Survivor and win the grand prize of A$500,000. (Note: The grand prize was A$250,000 prize in the shorter Australia V The World edition and a A$100,000 charity prize in the 2006 celebrity edition. The grand prize in the 2002 edition also included a car.)

In addition to being eliminated by a Tribal Council Vote, the Castaways can also elect to leave the game at any time, either if they are finding the game or the experience too difficult, or to attend to a personal emergency outside of the game. In the event of a castaway quitting, they may not be eligible to participate as a member of the Jury. Castaways who are injured can be removed from the game if the medical staff assess their condition and decides that they are not fit to continue. Unlike some versions, injured castaways can be sent to the hospital for up to 24 hours to assess the nature and severity of their injury. If the injury can be remedied, they may be allowed to return to the game.

Like other editions of the show, the Australian edition has introduced numerous modifications or twists on the core rules to prevent players from over-relying on strategies that succeeded in prior seasons or other editions of Survivor. These changes have included tribe switches, players being exiled from their tribe for a short period of time, hidden immunity idols that players can use to save themselves or another player at Tribal Council from being voted off, voting powers that can be used to influence the result at Tribal Council, multiple players winning Immunity thought the challenge after the Merge, the opportunity to eliminate members of the Jury before the Final Tribal Council, and players being given a chance to return after they have been voted off.

== Survivor in Australia ==
The first Australian version of the Survivor format was filmed in late 2001 and aired in 2002 on the Nine Network. The program was a contractual obligation if the network were to be allowed to continue to broadcast American Survivor. The program was criticised for poor casting and lower production value than the popular American edition and it was not renewed due to low ratings. The Nine Network still hold the first-run rights to American Survivor and have continued to broadcast the American edition of the program ever since. Since 2013, recent seasons air on Nine's secondary channel; 9Go! and streamed on 9Now within hours of the original American airing, with most seasons since 2015 having the finale broadcast as a simulcast of the American Eastern Time broadcast, across Australia. Since 2026, with the commemorative 25th anniversary season, Survivor US 50: In the Hands of the Fans the American series moved to Nine’s affiliated streaming network Stan.

In 2006, the Seven Network found a loophole in the contract between the Nine Network and Castaway Television, which allowed them to produce a celebrity version of the series due to a celebrity format being licensed separately from the original format. While the series was a modest success in the ratings, Seven Network did not renew the series.

In November 2015, Network Ten revealed at its upfront event that it would air a new season featuring regular contestants to air in the last quarter of 2016. This new season gave Australian Survivor the distinction of being one of the few Australian programs to have aired across all three major commercial television networks in Australia. Australian Survivor has continued to air mostly yearly. In 2020, it was intended for there to be two seasons of the show, with the All Stars edition set to be followed by another season in mid-late 2020, however, the onset of the COVID-19 prevented filming of the second season. The following two seasons (Brains V Brawn and Blood V Water) were filmed in Outback Queensland, due to travel restrictions as well as safety concerns resulting from the COVID-19 pandemic. These seasons aired in 2021 and 2022.

The show's most recent season, Brains V Brawn II concluded in March 2025, with a second shorter season, Australia V The World airing from August 2025. Ahead of the season's broadcast, Network 10 confirmed in June 2025 that this would be Jonathan LaPaglia's final season as host. The decision was met with a large fan outcry. He was succeeded by three-time player and All Stars winner David Genat, beginning with 2026 and the Redemption season.

Following Network Ten's acquisition by CBS (the American broadcaster of the format) in 2017, starting in December 2018, CBS made the complete American Survivor series available on their paid Australian streaming platform, Paramount+ (previously known as 10 All Access until August 2021). The broadcasts include Survivor US: Marquesas, which never aired in Australia due to Nine Network's commitment in airing their 2002 version of Australian Survivor. Originally, a select few seasons are also uploaded to Network Ten's free streaming site, 10 Play. As of June 2022, all seasons are uploaded to 10Play. Each American season is uploaded sometime after the season has aired on Nine Network, when the rights to that season revert to CBS under their agreement.

Additionally, as of September 2020, both seasons of Survivor NZ and the Philippines and Island of Secrets seasons of Survivor South Africa were also uploaded on 10 Play. Both the Immunity Island and Return of the Outcasts seasons of Survivor South Africa and the 2023 revival of Survivor UK were available to be streamed in Australia, on the same day they aired in their originating networks (M-Net in South Africa and BBC One in the United Kingdom).

== Series overview ==
| Series | Subtitle | Location | Original Tribes | Host | Grand Prize | Days | Episodes | Originally released | | | Winner | Runner(s)–up | Final vote |
| Series | Subtitle | Location | Original Tribes | Host | Grand Prize | Days | Episodes | First released | Last released | Network | Winner | Runner(s)–up | Final vote |
|---|---|---|---|---|---|---|---|---|---|---|---|---|---|
| 1 | —N/a | Whaler's Way, Eyre Peninsula, South Australia | Two tribes of eight new players | Lincoln Howes | A$500,000 & Ford V6; Escape | 39 | 13 | 13 February 2002 | 15 May 2002 | Nine Network | Rob Dickson | Sciona Browne | 5–2 |
| 2 | Celebrity: Vanuatu | Efate, Shefa, Vanuatu | Two tribes of six celebrities; split by gender, with one of the opposite gender | Ian Dickson | A$100,000 (for Charity) | 25 | 12 | 17 August 2006 | 2 November 2006 | Seven Network | Guy Leech | Justin Melvey | 3–2 |
| 3 | —N/a | Upolu, Samoa | Three tribes of eight new players | Jonathan LaPaglia | A$500,000 | 55 | 26 | 21 August 2016 | 25 October 2016 | Network 10 | Kristie Bennett | Lee Carseldine | 8–1 |
| 4 | —N/a | Upolu, Samoa | Two tribes of twelve new players | Jonathan LaPaglia | A$500,000 | 55 | 26 | 30 July 2017 | 10 October 2017 | Network 10 | Jericho Malabonga | Tara Pitt | 6–3 |
| 5 | Champions V Contenders | Savusavu, Fiji | Two tribes of twelve divided by status: "Champions" & "Contenders" | Jonathan LaPaglia | A$500,000 | 50 | 24 | 1 August 2018 | 9 October 2018 | Network 10 | Shane Gould | Sharn Coombes | 5–4 |
| 6 | Champions V Contenders II | Savusavu, Fiji | Two tribes of twelve divided by status: "Champions" & "Contenders" | Jonathan LaPaglia | A$500,000 | 50 | 24 | 24 July 2019 | 17 September 2019 | Network 10 | Pia Miranda | Baden Gilbert | 9–0 |
| 7 | All Stars | Savusavu, Fiji | Two tribes of twelve returning players | Jonathan LaPaglia | A$500,000 | 50 | 24 | 3 February 2020 | 30 March 2020 | Network 10 | David Genat | Sharn Coombes | 8–1 |
| 8 | Brains V Brawn | Cloncurry, Queensland | Two tribes of twelve divided by characteristic: "Brains" & "Brawn" | Jonathan LaPaglia | A$500,000 | 48 | 24 | 18 July 2021 | 12 September 2021 | Network 10 | Hayley Leake | George Mladenov | 7–2 |
| 9 | Blood V Water | Charters Towers, Queensland | Twelve pairs of pre-existing relationships, including new and returning players, split into two tribes of twelve. | Jonathan LaPaglia | A$500,000 | 47 | 24 | 31 January 2022 | 4 April 2022 | Network 10 | Mark Wales | Shayelle "Shay" Lajoie & Chrissy Zaremba | 10–0–0 |
| 10 | Heroes V Villains | Upolu, Samoa | 13 new and 11 returning players, divided into two tribes of twelve by reputation: "heroes" vs. "villains" traits. | Jonathan LaPaglia | A$500,000 | 47 | 24 | 30 January 2023 | 27 March 2023 | Network 10 | Liz Parnov | Gerry Geltch & Matt Sharp | 7–0–0 |
| 11 | Titans V Rebels | Upolu, Samoa | Two tribes of twelve, divided by approach to life: "Titans" & "Rebels" | Jonathan LaPaglia | A$500,000 | 47 | 24 | 29 January 2024 | 19 March 2024 | Network 10 | Feras Basal | Caroline Courtis | 9–0 |
| 12 | Brains V Brawn II | Upolu, Samoa | Two tribes of twelve divided by characteristic: "Brains" & "Brawn" | Jonathan LaPaglia | A$500,000 | 47 | 24 | 17 February 2025 | 14 April 2025 | Network 10 | Myles Kuah | Kaelan Lockhart | 7–1 |
| 13 | Australia V The World | Upolu, Samoa | Two tribes of seven, split by originating Survivor series: Australian Survivors & other editions of Survivor. | Jonathan LaPaglia | A$250,000 | 16 | 10 | 17 August 2025 | 7 September 2025 | Network 10 | Parvati Shallow | Luke Toki & Janine Allis | 6–1–0 |
| 14 | Redemption | Upolu, Samoa | Two tribes of twelve, including four returning players | David Genat | A$500,000 | 45 | 24 | 23 February 2026 | 14 April 2026 | Network 10 | Caleb Beeby | Jackson Goonrey | 6–3 |

== Production ==
=== Casting ===
Over the course of 14 seasons, a total of 255 castaways have participated in the program.

=== Locations ===
| Region | Locations | | | Season number(s) |
|---|---|---|---|---|
| Oceania | Australia | Queensland | Charters Towers | 9 |
| Oceania | Australia | Queensland | Cloncurry | 8 |
| Oceania | Australia | South Australia | Whaler's Way, Eyre Peninsula | 1 |
| Oceania | Fiji | | Savusavu | 5, 6, 7 |
| Oceania | Samoa | | Upolu | 3, 4, 10, 11, 12, 13, 14 |
| Oceania | Vanuatu | | Efate, Shefa | 2 |
| Asia | Malaysia | | | 15 |

==== Reunion Locations ====
Some seasons feature a reveal of the winner back in Australia, with votes read in front of a live studio audience, followed by a reunion show where the contestants discuss the season's events and the impact of their experience. This is a practice utilised in other versions of the show, including notably the American Version. Unlike the American version, most of the reunions are filmed a few days before broadcast.

The reunion of Australian Survivor 2002 was filmed at Melbourne's Crown Casino, with series host Lincoln Howes revealing the winner before Eddie McGuire hosted the reunion discussion. This was the only reunion to be broadcast live.

The reunion returned with Australian Survivor 2017, and the practice continued until All-Stars, with the exception of Champions V Contenders II, due to the concurrent productions of All Stars. These shows were produced at 10's Studios in Sydney, and all reunion shows were hosted by the series host Jonathan LaPaglia except for the All-Stars reunion, which was hosted by Osher Günsberg, as LaPaliga could not return to Australia due to travel restrictions being introduced during Covid-19 Pandemic. The practice of a reunion show was put on hold, partly due to the uncertainty of the COVID-19 pandemic. The practice of holding a reunion was reintroduced during Redemption, with the reunion being produced overlooking Sydney Harbour at the Overseas Passenger Terminal in Sydney.

Seasons that do not feature a reunion have the final vote reveal filmed on the island, often with both the true ending and a fake ending filmed (in which the runner-up is filmed winning) to avoid leaks of the season's results.

== Broadcast and ratings ==
| # | Network | Episodes | Timeslot | Premiere | | | Finale | | | | | Reunion | | Average Viewers | Average Rank | Ref |
| # | Network | Episodes | Timeslot | Date | Viewers | Rank | Date | Viewers Finale | Rank | Viewers Winner Reveal | Rank | Viewers | Rank | Average Viewers | Average Rank | Ref |
|---|---|---|---|---|---|---|---|---|---|---|---|---|---|---|---|---|
| 1 | 9 | 13 (Note: In addition to the 13 episodes, two specials aired – a casting special and a behind the scenes special) | Wednesday 8:30 pm | 13 February 2002 | —N/a (Note: No Ratings Information is available for these seasons) | | 15 May 2002 | —N/a | | | | | | | | |
| 2 | 7 | 12 | Thursday 8:30 pm | 17 August 2006 | —N/a | | 2 November 2006 | —N/a | | | | —N/a (Note: No Reunion Show was held.) | | —N/a | | |
| 3 | Ten | 26 | Sunday, Monday & Tuesday 7:30 pm (Note: The program occasionally deviates from these timeslots - check the ratings table on each season's page for specific timeslots for each episode.) | 21 August 2016 | 857,000; 848,000 (Note: The premiere was coded into two programs - titled "Launch" and “Tribal Council". Two sets of ratings were produced.) | 5; 6 | 25 October 2016 | 914,000 | 7 | 1,172,000 | 1 | —N/a | | 786,000 | 10 | |
| 4 | Ten | 26 | Sunday, Monday & Tuesday 7:30 pm | 30 July 2017 | 691,000 | 8 | 10 October 2017 | 825,000 | 8 | 943,000 | 2 | 613,000 | 13 | 698,000 | 10 | |
| 5 | Ten | 24 | Monday & Tuesday 7:30 pm | 1 August 2018 | 779,000 | 7 | 9 October 2018 | 914,000 | 5 | 922,000 | 4 | 667,000 | 13 | 765,000 | 9 | |
| 6 | 10 (Note: No network change. “Network Ten" rebranded as "Network 10" in late 2018.) | 24 | Sunday, Monday & Tuesday 7:30 pm | 24 July 2019 | 925,000 | 2 | 17 September 2019 | 968,000 | 4 | 1,079,000 | 1 | —N/a | | 840,000 | 6 | |
| 7 | 10 | 24 | Monday, Tuesday & Wednesday 7:30 pm | 3 February 2020 | 715,000 | 8 | 30 March 2020 | 908,000 | 9 | 1,034,000 | 6 | 677,000 | 14 | 733,000 | 9 | |
| 8 | 10 | 24 | Sunday, Monday & Tuesday 7:30 pm | 18 July 2021 | 824,000 | 4 | 12 September 2021 | 826,000 | 7 | 991,000 | 6 | —N/a | | 752,000 | 8 | |
| 9 | 10 | 24 | Sunday, Monday & Tuesday 7:30 pm | 31 January 2022 | 697,000 | 8 | 4 April 2022 | 631,000 | 11 | 749,000 | 8 | —N/a | | 568,000 | 9 | |
| 10 | 10 | 24 | Sunday, Monday & Tuesday 7:30 pm | 30 January 2023 | 536,000 | 12 | 27 March 2023 | 644,000 | 9 | 699,000 | 6 | —N/a | | 557,000 | 8 | |
| 11 (Note: In 2024, the OzTAM system by which Television ratings are recorded changed, with the rank now determined by a program's reach (viewers nationally who watch a minute of a program) rather than by average viewership over the length of the program. Both Reach and Average viewership are recorded. For consistency, the average viewership is used in this table.) | 10 | 24 | Sunday, Monday & Tuesday 7:30 pm | 29 January 2024 | 857,000 | 13 | 19 March 2024 | 877,000 | 6 | —N/a (Note: The finale was only coded into one program - unlike past seasons with a separate "Winner Revealed" Segment. Hence, only one set of ratings was produced.) | | —N/a | | 802,000 | 8 | |
| 12 | 10 | 24 | Sunday 7:00 pm, Monday & Tuesday 7:30 pm | 17 February 2025 | 836,000 | 9 | 14 April 2025 | 932,000 | 5 | —N/a | | —N/a | | 704,000 | 8 | |
| 13 | 10 | 10 | Sunday 7:00 pm, Monday & Tuesday 7:30 pm | 17 August 2025 | 906,000 | 7 | 7 September 2025 | 862,000 | 6 | —N/a | | —N/a | | 840,000 | 8 | |
| 14 | 10 | 24 | Sunday 7:00 pm & Monday, Tuesday, Wednesday 7:30 pm | 23 February 2026 | 732,000 | 11 | 14 April 2026 | 593,000 | 14 | —N/a | | 355,000 | 21 | 634,000 | 13 | |

== Companion series ==
In addition to the main program, two companion web programs are also produced for Australian Survivor with both airings on 10's free video on demand streaming service 10Play. 10Play also hosts deleted scenes called "Secret Scenes" as well as additional interviews from the contestants.

=== Jury Villa ===
Introduced in the 3rd season, Jury Villa is based on the Ponderosa series from American Survivor. The series follows the castaways that are voted off during the jury phase of the game as they become members of the Tribal Council Jury and interact with one another in the villa. Each episode focuses primarily on the latest evictee and their arrival in the villa. Episodes are released through 10Play following the airing of each episode of the main show of the Jury phase of the game.

For unknown reasons, the series did not air on Australia V The World. On Redemption clips from the Jury Villa were shown on social media.

=== Talking Tribal ===
Introduced in the All Stars season, Talking Tribal is an aftershow that unpacks all of the castaway's strategies from the main show. The show premiered on Friday 31 January 2020, days before the premiere of All-Stars for a preview special. The show then airs weekly after each Wednesday night episode of the main show. In addition to airing as web series on 10 Play, the series also airs as an audio podcast on 10's podcast platform 10 speaks. The first season was hosted by former contestant Luke Toki and television presenter James Mathison, who were joined by Rob Has a Podcast podcaster Shannon Guss as a regular panelist, with the trio being joined by a guest panelists each week.

Talking Tribal's second season (companion to the Brains V Brawn edition of the show) was hosted by Luke Toki and Nova Perth radio host and Big Brother 2002 housemate Nathan Morris, who were joined by Shannon Guss and former player Nick Iadanza.

Mathison and Guss were joined by the winner and the runner-up of Brains V Brawn, Hayley Leake and George Mladenov, in the third season of Talking Tribal during Blood V Water. Brooke Jowett from the third season and All Stars, alongside Khanh Ong from Blood V Water, joined Guss in the fourth season of Talking Tribal during Heroes V Villains. Chrissy Zaremba from Blood V Water joined Guss in the fifth season of Talking Tribal during Titans V Rebels, with Mladenov returning for a second season.

The series did not return for Brains V Brawn II.

=== Drop Your Buffs ===
For Australia V The World, the fan podcast, Drop Your Buffs was announced as the official companion show for the season - with regular host Sean Ross joined by two-time player Nick Iadanza, and Survivor US 41 player Ricard Foyé. Filmed in Samoa during production, the show features a brief discussion of the events from the last episode alongside an interview with the most recently evicted castaway.

=== Jury's Out ===
Hosted by Nick Iadanza and four-time player Shonee Bowtell, Jury's Out was the companion show for Australian Survivor: Redemption. It features interviews with each member of the jury.

== International broadcast ==
The series airs on the following channels outside of Australia:

- In New Zealand the series airs on TVNZ 2, with the series also being available on TVNZ+.
- In the Europe, the series airs on Amazon Prime Video.
- In the United States, the series aired on Paramount+ but is not currently available as of 14 February 2022 due to the service losing streaming rights.
- In Slovakia and Czech Republic, the series is available on streaming platform Voyo.
- In South Africa, the series airs on M-Net.
- In Sweden, the series is titled Robinson Australien (reflecting the Expedition Robinson title used in Sweden for Survivor) and is available to watch on TV4's streaming service, TV4 Play.

== Awards and nominations ==
| Year | Award | Category | Nominee | Result | Refs. |
|---|---|---|---|---|---|
| 2003 | Logie Awards of 2003 | Best Reality Program | 2002 Season | Nominated | |
| 2017 | Logie Awards of 2017 | Best Reality Program | 2016 Season | Nominated | |
| 2017 | 7th AACTA Awards | Best Reality Television Series | 2017 Season | Nominated | |
| 2017 | 7th AACTA Awards | Best Direction in a Television Light Entertainment, Lifestyle Or Reality Series | Richard Franc (Episode 1 – 2017 Season) | Won | |
| 2018 | 8th AACTA Awards | Best Reality Television Series | Australian Survivor: Champions vs. Contenders (2018 season) | Won | |
| 2019 | Logie Awards of 2019 | Most Popular Reality Program | Australian Survivor: Champions vs. Contenders (2018 season) | Nominated | |
| 2019 | Logie Awards of 2019 | Most Outstanding Reality Program | Australian Survivor: Champions vs. Contenders (2018 season) | Won | |
| 2019 | 9th AACTA Awards | Best Reality Television Series | Australian Survivor: Champions vs. Contenders (2019 season) | Won | |
| 2020 | 10th AACTA Awards | Best Reality Television Series | Australian Survivor: All Stars | Nominated | |
| 2021 | 11th AACTA Awards | Best Reality Television Series | Australian Survivor: Brains V Brawn | Nominated | |
| 2022 | 12th AACTA Awards | Best Reality Television Series | Australian Survivor: Blood V Water | Nominated | |
| 2023 | Logie Awards of 2023 | Most Outstanding Reality Program | Australian Survivor: Heroes V Villains | Won | |

== See also ==
Other versions

- Survivor US
- Survivor UK
- Survivor NZ
- Survivor South Africa
- Survivor Québec
- Survivor Finland

Similar shows

- Alone Australia
- Big Brother Australia
- Escape from Scorpion Island
- I'm a Celebrity...Get Me Out of Here!
- Million Dollar Island
- The Bridge
- The Big Adventure
- The Traitors
- The Summit
- Treasure Island
