= Australian Survivor season 1 =

Australian Survivor
- Season 1
- Presented by: Lincoln Howes
- No. of days: 39
- No. of castaways: 16
- Winner: Rob Dickson
- Runner-up: Sciona Browne
- Location: Whaler's Way, Eyre Peninsula, South Australia
- No. of episodes: 13 (plus 2 specials)

Release
- Original network: Nine Network
- Original release: 13 February – 15 May 2002

Additional information
- Filming dates: November – December 2001

Season chronology
- Next → Celebrity Survivor: Vanuatu (on the Seven Network)

The first season of Australian Survivor, the inaugural Australian adaptation of the international reality competition franchise Survivor, was filmed in Whaler's Way, an Eyre Peninsula coastal nature reserve near Port Lincoln, South Australia in the Great Australian Bight, where numerous ships had sunk off the coast in the past, setting up the season's nautical theme.

Hosted by 60 Minutes journalist Lincoln Howes, the program consisted of 16 Australian castaways competing for 39 days for a grand prize of A$500,000 and a Ford V6 Escape. The series was filmed in November and December 2001 and aired weekly between February and May 2002 on the Nine Network, culminating in a live finale on 15 May 2002, where former Victorian Football League player Robert "Rob" Dickson was crowned the "Sole Survivor" over former test pilot Sciona Browne in a jury vote of 5–2.

The program was criticised by fans and critics for poor casting and lower production values than the popular American edition (which also aired on Nine) and was not renewed due to low ratings. However the series did return (albeit on a different network) in 2006 with a celebrity edition.

== Production ==
=== Conception ===
In 2000, Nine began airing Survivor: Borneo, the first season of the American Survivor production. The agreement for Nine to air the American series included the condition that they must produce their own local Australian edition of Survivor. The local edition was announced publicly during the night of the local airing of the finale of Survivor US: The Australian Outback in early May 2001. This announcement also began the casting call for Australians willing to compete on the show.

=== Filming and development ===
The people included for consideration for host included Grant Kenny, Jamie Durie and Richard Hatch, the "Sole Survivor" of Survivor US: Borneo. Eventually, Lincoln Howes, a journalist from Nine's 60 Minutes, was named as host.

The production scouted locations across Australia to be used for the series. Locations considered included Uluru/Ayers Rock in the Northern Territory and the Kimberley region in Western Australia. However production settled on Whaler's Way, on the South Australian coastline, 30 km (19 mi) from the town of Port Lincoln, where the production crew was based. This location set up a nautical/shipwreck theme for the series. A majority of the challenges centred around the water (many of which were originally created by the show and not derived from the American series), Tribal Council was located on a shipwreck called "The Great Beyond", tribal immunity was in the form of a bell, and individual immunity was in the form of a rope necklace with shark's teeth. The theme song incorporated an Irish jig in a nod to Australian history – First Fleet arriving. An extended version of the main theme was played during the closing credits of the live finale and reunion show.

=== Broadcast ===
The show was broadcast by the Nine Network in the Wednesday 8:30 pm time slot and was rated PG. In addition to 12 regular hour-long episodes and the 3-hour long finale/reunion show, two specials for the series were produced.

An auditions special hosted by Ben Dark aired the day before the main series aired, showing some of the highlights and lowlights from the 8,500 audition submissions sent into the show before revealing the 16 people who would compete on the series. Additionally, the program included an interview with Ethan Zohn; the "Sole Survivor" of Survivor US: Africa.

The other special was a behind-the-scenes show that aired a few weeks after the series ended and was titled Surviving Survivor. Among other things, this special revealed that the final four wanted to quit the show due to the dramatic turn of events concerning Katie's behaviour (her mental breakdown right before the Tribal Council on Day 37) as well as the threat of an unknown change in rules impacting the end game, intended to make the castaways reassess their solidified strategies. The producers threatened to give the prize money to the last eliminated contestant (Sophie) if the contestants continued to defy production. The contestants eventually complied, and the threat of a rule change was unfounded, with the game continuing as intended.

The format of the Finale and Reunion shows of Nine's Australian Survivor was rather different to the American edition's finales at the time. The finale/reunion program featured reunion show host, Eddie McGuire, introducing each segment of the show live from the finale venue (Melbourne's Crown Casino) as the night progressed. The American production adopted this format starting with its 28th season, Survivor US: Cagayan, in 2014, until the practice of a studio reunion show was dropped in 2019, with the last studio reunion being a part of the 39th season, Survivor US: Island of the Idols.

=== Promotion ===
The evicted contestant from each episode was featured for an interview on the Today show on the following day. These interviews were conducted by Richard Wilkins just before the 8:00 AM news. This paralleled the American edition, where evicted contestants were interviewed on CBS' The Early Show during its time on air.

The program had several sponsors who were involved in product placements spots on the show (most as rewards for reward challenges). Sponsors included Cadbury, IBM, Jetset travel agencies, Schweppes, Fa deodorant for men, Lays potato crisps, Telstra, Ford and Intel Pentium (which was also used in producing the show's graphics).

== Contestants ==
The cast of the first season

The sixteen players were initially separated into two tribes, Kadina and Tipara, both named after ships that traveled in the area. On Day 19, the ten remaining players merged into the Aurora tribe. The final nine players made up the two finalists and the seven members of the Tribal Council jury, who ultimately decided who would be the "Sole Survivor".

List of Australian Survivor season 1 contestants
Contestant	Original tribe	Merged tribe	Finish
Lucinda Allen-Rhodes; 43, Byron Bay, NSW	Kadina		1st voted out Day 3
Tim Dugan; 51, Green Point, NSW	Kadina		2nd voted out Day 6
David Haas; 34, Sydney, NSW	Kadina		3rd voted out Day 9
Jeff Brown; 52, Canberra, ACT	Tipara		4th voted out Day 12
Deborah Peart; 26, Sydney, NSW	Kadina		5th voted out Day 15
Sylvan Dorney; 25, Sydney, NSW	Kadina		6th voted out Day 18
Caren Shaw; 28, Darwin, NT	Kadina	Aurora	7th voted out Day 21
Naomi Knight; 22, Melbourne, VIC	Kadina	Aurora	8th voted out 1st jury member Day 24
Craig Abbott; 27, Point Lonsdale, VIC	Kadina	Aurora	9th voted out 2nd jury member Day 27
Lance Brooks; 39, Sydney, NSW	Tipara	Aurora	10th voted out 3rd jury member Day 30
Jane Dalton; 18, Newcastle, NSW	Tipara	Aurora	11th voted out 4th jury member Day 33
Sophie Woods; 30, Sydney, NSW	Tipara	Aurora	12th voted out 5th jury member Day 35
Katie Gold; 24, Melbourne, VIC	Tipara	Aurora	13th voted out 6th jury member Day 37
Joel Betts; 22, Sydney, NSW	Tipara	Aurora	14th voted out 7th jury member Day 38
Sciona Browne; 49, Perth, WA	Tipara	Aurora	Runner-up; Day 39
Robert "Rob" Dickson; 37, Traralgon, VIC	Tipara	Aurora	Sole Survivor; Day 39

== Season summary ==
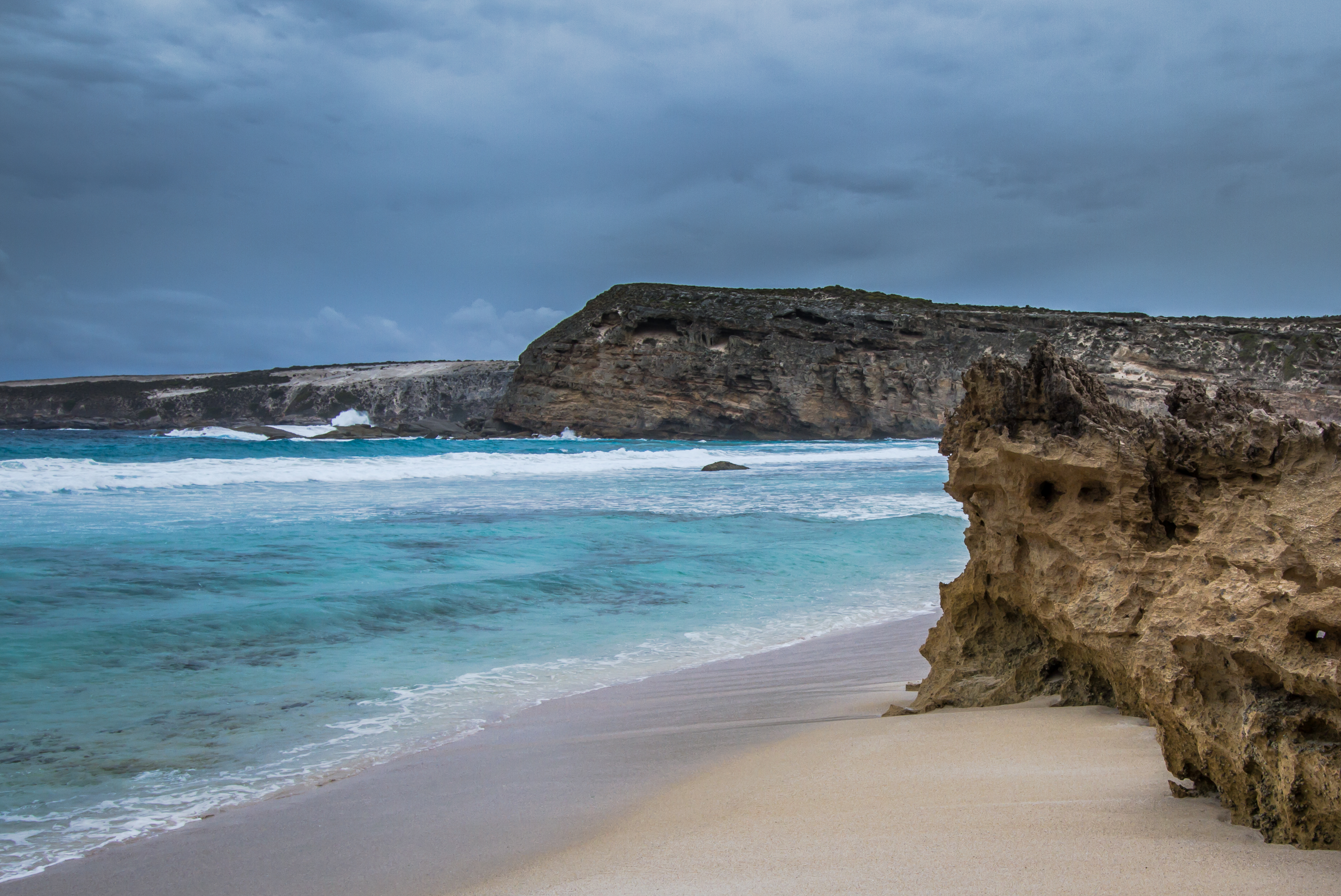
The season filmed on the Eyre Peninsula in South Australia.

The sixteen players were divided into two tribes: Kadina in green, and Tipara in blue. Tipara won more immunity challenges, and their members stuck together to systematically eliminate the Kadina members after the merge. A final three alliance of Rob, Sciona, and Joel emerged, and Rob eliminated Joel after winning the final immunity challenge. The jury respected Rob's leadership over Sciona's quieter gameplay, naming the former as Sole Survivor.

Challenge winners and eliminations by episode
Episode			Challenge winner(s)		Eliminated	Finish
No.	Episode Title	Air date	Reward	Immunity	Eliminated	Finish
1	"Journey To; Whaler's Way"	13 February 2002	None	Tipara	Lucinda	1st voted out Day 3
2	"Violent Weather and Violent People"	20 February 2002	Kadina	Tipara	Tim	2nd voted out Day 6
3	"The Losing Streak"	27 February 2002	Kadina	Tipara	David	3rd voted out Day 9
4	"The Struggle of Both Tribes"	6 March 2002	Tipara	Kadina (Note: In addition to winning Immunity, Kadina also won the right to participate in a special reward draw for the car used in the challenge. Sylvan drew the right key and won the car.)	Jeff	4th voted out Day 12
5	"It's Just Too Hard!"	13 March 2002	Kadina	Tipara	Deborah	5th voted out Day 15
6	"This Game is Way; Different Then it Looks"	20 March 2002	Tipara (Note: Tipara felt Kadina lost due to bad luck, and shared their reward.)	Joel [Tipara] (Note: This challenge was a one-on-one duel, with Joel and Sylvan being chosen to participate by their respective tribes. Joel won the challenge and won immunity for his entire tribe.)	Sylvan	6th voted out Day 18
7	"It's Time to Merge"	3 April 2002	None	Craig	Caren	7th voted out Day 21
8	"Pick Off"	10 April 2002	Naomi [Craig]	Craig	Naomi	8th voted out 1st jury member Day 24
9	"I Just Feel So Bad"	17 April 2002	Lance [Jane, Joel, Katie, Rob, Sciona, Sophie]	Sophie	Craig	9th voted out 2nd jury member Day 27
10	"He's a Threat, She's A Threat, We're all Threats!"	24 April 2002	Jane	Joel	Lance	10th voted out 3rd jury member Day 30
11	"Cockiness Comes to an End"	1 May 2002	Joel	Sciona	Jane	11th voted out 4th jury member Day 33
12	"Who's the Odd Man Out?"	8 May 2002	Katie [Joel, Rob, Sciona, Sophie]	Katie	Sophie	12th voted out 5th jury member Day 35
13	"Finale/Reunion"	15 May 2002	Katie [Joel, Rob, Sciona]	Rob	Katie	13th voted out 6th jury member Day 37
13	"Finale/Reunion"	15 May 2002	None	Rob	Joel	14th voted out 7th jury member Day 38
13	"Finale/Reunion"	15 May 2002			Final vote	
13	"Finale/Reunion"	15 May 2002			Sciona	Runner-up; Day 39
13	"Finale/Reunion"	15 May 2002			Rob	Sole Survivor; Day 39

In the case of multiple tribes or castaways who win reward or immunity, they are listed in order of finish, or alphabetically where it was a team effort; where one castaway won and invited others, the invitees are in brackets.

=== Episodes ===
No. overall	No. in season	Title	Timeline	Original release date
1	1	"Journey To Whaler's Way"	Days 1-3	13 February 2002
The 16 castaways arrived and were divided into two tribes. The youngest contestant, Jane, was asked to select heads or tails for a coin toss on behalf of the Tipara tribe; she lost, so Kadina were given the choice of whether they wanted the camp closest to the ocean and the food source, or the camp closest to a windmill, the water source for the duration of the competition. They chose the camp closest to the water source. Opinions were immediately voiced about how to build the shelters with the correct angle away from the sun and cold. Lucinda was notably vocal about using their tarp on the ground and sleeping with themselves inside it, much to everyone else's annoyance. Both teams struggled to set up their camps and light a fire, but Tipara was able to find some fish and start a fire before Kadina.: Immunity challenge: Both tribes got two logs out of the pond to bring them up the hill and use them as a ladder to get to the top of a platform. At the top of the platform was a torch; one person lit it and then lit some other torches. That person then threw the torches until they lit a fuse above their bonfire.; Tipara was first to strike their bonfire shortly followed by Kadina. As teams started to wait, however, the wind was too severe and the fire would not light, causing the challenge to be cancelled after 40 minutes. The next day, there was a tie breaker quiz about the history of Whaler's Way; with Lucinda and Jane being the people to answer the 4th question alone, Lucinda was incorrect, giving the first immunity win to Tipara. Back at the Kadina camp, Lucinda admitted that she was struggling in such a harsh environment and told the tribe that she would be okay with being voted out and was expecting it. She was voted out at the first Tribal Council that night with all eight votes, giving her the distinction of being the first person in any edition of Survivor to vote for herself.
2	2	"Violent Weather and Violent People"	Days 4-6	20 February 2002
At the Kadina camp, everyone was having a tough time with the dirty environment and cooked fish in their water pot causing everything to taste and smell of fish. Negotiations were still being made in both tribes about how to better their shelter, hoping to be warmer in the cold harsh nights. At Tipara, Jeff's snoring also caused people to have little sleep throughout the night.: Reward challenge: Both tribes had to dig for a chest under a flag and pull it up a hill on three logs of wood and tracks. The logs had to be rotated to move the chest further each time. Kadina won their chest and everything inside it: 24 ice cold cans of Solo and camp accessories. Sophie sat out for Tipara.; Immunity challenge: Both tribes stood on a circle divided into 14 wedges. When a specific colour was called, one person from the opposing tribe pulled out the corresponding wedge. The person on that wedge had to move to another one. The first person who fell off the wedge lost immunity for their tribe. Jeff sat out for Tipara.; Tipara won when David touched the ground. After the immunity challenge, it was unclear who would be voted out, unlike the easy unanimous decision the first time around. Caren, Deborah, Naomi, and Sylvan felt that Tim was the weakest link and he was the next to go. Craig voted for David, David voted for Caren, and Tim voted for Deborah, but Tim was eliminated.
3	3	" The Losing Streak"	Days 7-9	27 February 2002
After Tribal Council, David criticised his tribe for voting out a strong tribe member and not putting the tribe before personal agendas. He was also visibly upset at receiving a vote from Craig, though he was not aware who cast the vote. Craig later approached David and informed him about his vote; David was understanding but stated in his confessional that he would "do something about it".: Reward challenge: Each tribe united several ropes inside a circle, but nobody could be inside the circle. When all the ropes were untied the tribes tied them together to make one large rope and used it to pull their boat out in the water and around a buoy and then come back and get their boat in the circle. The first tribe to do so won a hammock, two lanterns, a frying pan, and a large cooking pan. Sophie and Rob sat out for Tipara.; Kadina won reward. At Tipara, Katie and Sciona went fishing, with the former solidifying a Final 2 deal with the latter. Sciona suggested they bring Joel and Rob into their alliance to have a better chance with numbers, much to the pleasure of Katie. Sciona rubbed the other tribe members the wrong way with her opinion about leaving fish in the sun. She later went for a walk alone and spoke emotionally of her late father. At Kadina, David felt that Craig, Sylvan and Naomi were tightly aligned. He also felt that Deborah and Caren were more approachable since they were left out by others regarding the previous vote.: Immunity challenge: Both tribes cut through logs using an axe. Each person could only hit the log once and the tribe took turns hitting it. When they broke the log they brought a crow's nest down and in the crows nest was a ringer. They then used the ringer to ring a triangle to win immunity. Jane and Jeff sat out for Tipara.; Tipara won their third straight immunity challenge. At their camp, everyone celebrated and went for a swim in the ocean. The next day, Katie and Rob talked strategy, with Katie saying she wanted to set up a strong core alliance, considering Sophie an ally also. At Kadina, everyone expressed their frustration at losing another immunity challenge and Jeff's poor attitude at the challenge. With Kadina continuing to win rewards and lose immunity challenges, the tribe had low morale. Sylvan had redeemed himself at the challenges. David asked Deborah if she would vote for him as he believed they were the next to be voted out. Deborah did not want to make herself more vulnerable and told the rest of the tribe. At Tribal Council, David voted against Craig, but everyone else voted out David, believing that it was not acceptable to attempt to make alliances for a later part of the game.
4	4	"The Struggle of Both Tribes"	Days 10-12	6 March 2002
The remaining five Kadina members expressed their desperation to win an immunity challenge, in fear of being picked off by Tipara at the merge.: Reward challenge: Each tribe swam out to a pontoon and pulled up a treasure chest with a rope. The first tribe to take their chest back to shore and find one of five keys to unlock their treasure chest won snorkelling gear, chocolate and other assorted sweets.; Tipara won reward. They went out fishing for food and came across a beehive. Sciona and Joel broke the beehive, and the tribe was able to acquire honey. Deborah and Naomi talked about the coincidence of the remaining five Kadina members being in their twenties and Deborah expressed her fears of losing another immunity challenge and having to vote someone out yet again after the "Famous Five" had become so close.: Immunity challenge: Both tribes drove a car through several gates, with a person from the opposite tribe driving the car blindfolded while the rest of the tribe told that person where to drive to get through the gate. Kadina chose Jane to drive their car, and Tipara chose Caren. If the tribe didn't make it through the gate they had to put a flag on the windshield wipers before trying again. The first tribe to go through all the gates won immunity and would particapte in a special draw to win the car.; Kadina won their first immunity challenge, and one person from their tribe won a car. Sylvan drew the correct key to the car and won. Kadina expressed their happiness at finally winning an immunity challenge, while back at Tipara, talk about whom to vote out immediately arose with Jane being the most obvious choice because she was the driver in the challenge. Jeff's name also arose due to him being the physically weakest and oldest person in the game. At Tribal Council, Katie and Sciona were the only ones to vote with Jeff against Jane, while the rest of the tribe sent Jeff home.
5	5	"It's Just Too Hard!"	Days 13-15	13 March 2002
The day after Tipara's first Tribal Council, Joel was emotionally upset after voting out Jeff instead of Jane. The Kadina tribe went to their fishing spot and were all exhausted just from trekking there. Sylvan was suffering the most, stating that he was too tired to even think and couldn't fish for more than twenty minutes without becoming fatigued. Sylvan expressed his desire for different food in his belly other than fish and hoped they would win the next reward challenge.: Reward challenge: Beginning in a boat, tribes had to row to a buoy, then swim to their tribe flag closer to shore and retrieve a bag of spices and seasoning. They then had to follow a marked path to their second item (a cooking pot somewhere in knee deep water) and a third item (a hidden lobster trap with a live lobster inside). The first tribe to get all three items back to their platform on the shore and their live lobster in the pot with the lid on won those items, plus lemons and baguettes.; Kadina won reward. Deborah and Craig instantly trekked to their fishing spot to set up their newly acquired lobster trap. The next morning, Deborah was in pain due to rolling her ankle on the way to the fishing spot the night before.: Immunity challenge: Tribes had to run an obstacle course which involved running, jumping, climbing and crawling. At the end of the course, the tribes had to unfold a sail to win immunity. Jane and Joel sat out for the Tipara tribe.; Tipara edged out Kadina for immunity. Over at Tipara, Katie mapped out a plan for the rest of the game and showed it only to Rob, with the plan being to vote out Kadina one by one in the merge, then vote for Jane, Lance and Joel being in the minority of Tipara. Deborah was immediately targeted by Craig for being the slowest and having sustained an injury, while Caren thought that Deborah ran the obstacle course well even with an injury. Deborah thought that Caren was the weakest physically, and they discussed at the campfire that they would both like to be told if they were the one being voted out. After a trek to their fishing spot, the tribe could no longer see the buoy for their lobster trap, due to the strong currents. Later that night, Deborah was voted out due to her injury.
6	6	"This Game is Way Different Then it Looks"	Days 16-18	20 March 2002
Sylvan approached Caren and apologised for his vote against her. Caren told him that she knew he voted for her, which caused Sylvan to suspect that there was an alliance consisting of Caren, Craig and Naomi. While both tribes were struggling at this point of the game, Kadina was becoming emotional and missing home, while Tipara were struggling with rationing their food; each member only consumed around one fish per two days, causing some tribe members to begin snapping at each other.: Reward challenge: Both tribes rolled a barrel down a hill and put a flag in it. Then, they filled the barrel with sand. Using nails and a hammer, the tribes then put the lid on the barrel and rolled it back up the hill to win phone calls from home. Katie, Lance and Sciona sat out for Tipira.; Tipara won the challenge. At the end of the challenge, Tipara volunteered to have shorter calls with their loved ones to give time to Kadina, because if Kadina had not lost one of their nails in the sand in the challenge, they might have won.: Immunity challenge: One person from each tribe was tied to a rope (Sylvan for Kadina and Joel for Tipara). Each person had to stretch to reach poles in the sand and get them out of the ground. The person to get all of their poles out of the ground won immunity.; Joel won immunity for Tipara. The day after the challenge, Tipara had their first decent meal in five days, feasting on fish: the tribe members consumed two fish each. With Tribal Council looming for Kadina, Caren, Craig and Naomi were leaning towards voting for Sylvan, with the loss of the immunity challenge resting on his shoulders. Sylvan was not in any alliance, but tried to convince Caren and Naomi to vote out Craig, thinking he would be a huge threat in the merge. The women decided to stick with getting Sylvan out, while Sylvan changed his vote to Naomi.
7	7	"It's Time to Merge"	Days 19-21	3 April 2002
The morning after voting out Sylvan, Naomi and Caren were praying for a merge, and suspected it would happen on this day. After receiving tree mail, both tribes were told to gather everything they wanted and leave in five minutes. The Tipara and Kadina tribes were no more, and Aurora was formed. The new tribe hiked to their new camp, picking up fruits and nuts on the way, arriving at their new camp with fresh water and a hot shower. Sciona, Katie and Craig went fishing and caught enough fish for the consumption of two per tribe member, much to everyone's happiness. Katie expressed how Craig was the first Kadina who would be voted off in the merge and that she was beginning to double think the pecking order.: Immunity challenge: The individual immunity challenge had 4 stages. In stage 1, all ten survivors solved a puzzle to make a perfect square and then get a rope. The last three to finish were out. In stage 2, the survivors used ropes to hook a shovel and pull it out of the ground. In stage 3, the survivors used the shovel to dig for a wooden box. In stage 4, the last three opened their wooden box; inside was a compass giving them directions to the location of a flare which they used to light a torch to win immunity.; Craig lit the torch first and won immunity. After the immunity challenge, Katie immediately approached the three remaining Kadina (Naomi, Caren and Craig), and proposed to them that they vote out Lance first, ensuring their safety for another round. All three were suspicious of Katie's motives and questioned her as to why. She stated that Lance was a threat physically, mentally and socially. However, at Tribal Council, the Tipara seven stuck together, and with Craig having immunity and not being able to be voted for, Caren was voted out. She and Naomi voted against Lance, but Craig voted against Rob.
8	8	"Pick Off"	Days 22-24	10 April 2002
Rob was paranoid about the one vote cast against him at the previous Tribal Council. Questioning who it was, he assumed that it was a member of the old Kadina tribe, but remained wary that it could well be one of the Tipara seven. Sciona expressed her frustration at people taking too long to wake up in the morning and get ready to go fishing (mainly Jane). Katie also stated that Jane was useless and was just there looking pretty.: Reward challenge: The survivors had to make up a story and the rest of tribe then guess if it was true or false. The person who had the most people who believe their story won a night in a traditional 1840s cottage with food, wine and access to the internet through a provided computer. Also included in the reward was a computer from Intel Pentium for the winning castaways when they returned home.; Naomi won the challenge. She was allowed to select one person to take with her on the reward; she selected fellow ex-Kadina tribemate Craig. While Naomi and Craig enjoyed their reward, the rest of the Aurora tribe sat in their shelter through a large thunderstorm. The next day, Joel told Rob that Craig had approached him before the last Tribal Council and told him of Katie's attempt to vote out Lance. Katie then told Sciona and Lance that Craig was the one to approach her and inform her of an alliance between Lance and Joel.: Immunity challenge: Each survivor had to hold a rod over a fire for as long as possible. If the rod lit on fire or they moved the rod away from the fire they were out.; Craig won immunity for the second straight time, beating Rob after one hour and three minutes. Naomi was immediately targeted as being the only vulnerable Kadina member left in the game. Certain members of the Tipara seven were questioning if they wanted to vote off Naomi and instead target Jane, being the weakest left in the game and viewing it as a good strategic move. Despite their conflicts, the Tipara seven stuck together to send Naomi to the jury.
9	9	"I Just Feel So Bad"	Days 25-27	17 April 2002
Both Craig and Jane caused controversy and ruffled feathers at Aurora. Katie was specifically vocal about her distaste of Jane being on the show, stating that she didn't think she represented a good image for the show and that she was always complaining and lazy. Katie also called Craig a "weasel" and an "asshole", saying that she wouldn't be able to contain her excitement when he was voted off. Sciona discussed with Rob that she had become very fond of Craig and she wasn't ready to vote him out, suggesting that they bring him into their alliance with Katie and Sophie and vote out one of the other Tipara. Rob agreed with Sciona but later told the cameras that he was wary of Craig, as he was a smart guy who knew what he was doing.: Reward challenge: Castaways started in a 9x9 life-size grid. They had to place elimination discs in one of the squares; once a disc was placed in a square, that square was out of bounds. They then moved to another grid, up, down, or diagonally, placing an additional elimination disc in the square that they had just left. Once a castaway was surrounded by discs and no longer able to make a move, they were out of the challenge. The last person standing would win a large pizza for themselves and a can of Pepsi.; Lance won the reward and decided to give each tribe member a slice of pizza.: Immunity challenge: Castaways were told to pick partners. These partners would actually be their opponents in the first of three rounds. In round 1, all four pairs ate a whole pilchard, swallowed everything and showed Lincoln their mouth. The winning member from each pair moved on to the second round, where they had to consume three baby squid. The two winners from the two remaining pairs moved on to the final round where they ate sixteen fish eyes to win immunity.; Sophie beat Katie in the final round and was awarded immunity. After the challenge, Craig continued to campaign against Katie. Joel approached him and asked again if Katie really was in an alliance, with Craig giving his word that she was in a secret alliance. Down at the fishing spot, Sophie approached Rob and offered to go to the final two with him, telling him that she knew Sciona and Katie had already approached him with the same offer. Rob accepted the offer but was wary and later told the cameras that he believed Sophie was playing the game the hardest. Whilst on a walk, Craig and Sciona discussed a possible alliance with the two Tipara members on the outs (Joel and Lance). Craig later approached Rob and informed him that he would indeed be voting for him at tribal council and he would receive a total of three votes. Katie was visibly uneasy at this after Rob approached her and second guessed her loyalty. Ultimately, the Tipara seven stuck together again to send Craig to the jury.
10	10	"He's a Threat, She's A Threat, We're all Threats!"	Days 28-30	28 April 2002
Sophie expressed her disdain for Katie, calling her sneaky and untrustworthy. Katie did some damage control with Rob and tried to make sure they were still in a tight bond. Rob forgave Katie but remained doubtful.: Reward challenge: Tribe members attempted to throw painted cricket balls through a giant slingshot into the ocean, aiming for a large ring in the water. The most balls in the target won a traditional afternoon tea.; Jane won reward and was the only person to score in the challenge. Joel started to rub the rest of his tribemates the wrong way by being loud and boisterous while they were becoming increasingly fatigued and famished.: Immunity challenge: Estimating measurements. In each round, furthest away was out. Tribe mates had to find random objects from the land around them. First: Something weighing one kilogramme. Second: Something one metre long. Third: One minute (using stopwatches borrowed from a local school). Fourth: Two litres of water from a barrel. Fifth: The current temperature. Sixth: The current weight of the other person remaining in the challenge. Despite the ‘cold’ appearance of the season, it was over thirty degrees Celsius during the challenge.; Joel won immunity. Despite having no former Kadina members left to vote out, the remaining original Tipara were somewhat laid back considering they would have to vote one of their original members out for the first time since Day 12 in the game. Not much strategy was talked about, but almost every member was concerned it could be their name written down. In the end, Lance was voted out and became the third jury member.
11	11	"Cockiness Comes to an End"	Days 31-33	1 May 2002
Reward challenge: Survivors had to move five life rings along a rope cluttered with driftwood and other debris. The winner got to webcam their loved ones for fifteen minutes, while the losers got to text their loved ones instead.; Joel won reward. Sophie was emotionally distraught after not being able to see her young children on webcam, who could not yet read. Joel wrongfully suspected that Rob, Jane, Sophie and Katie were in an alliance of four. Sciona expressed her concern for Joel and his mental health, as he was suffering from mood swings, and Rob also mentioned that Katie was visibly becoming more exhausted. After Jane asked Sciona how to cook rice on the campfire, and Joel struggled to rebuild the fire the next morning, Sciona was frustrated at living with a younger generation.: Immunity challenge: Players had to stand on individual floating pontoons with only their feet touching the platform. Temptations were offered via remote-control boat, but players did not have to quit the challenge to receive them if they could reach them.; Sciona lasted 3 hours, 40 minutes and won her first immunity. At camp, Joel pleaded for his life to Rob and Sciona. They later informed him of their alliance of four, consisting of themselves, Sophie and Katie, and emphasised that they were the most loyal to each other in their alliance. Sciona and Rob then made a final three alliance with Joel, on the grounds that he throws the final immunity challenge which would put Rob and Sciona in the final two. Joel happily agreed. Going into the vote, Jane was confident that she would remain to play another day, but due to Rob and Sciona securing a new alliance and voting with Joel, he and Jane each received three votes, causing a tie. In the case of a tie, everyone except for Jane and Joel re-voted. The votes were again tied and a Tribal Council countback was called. Jane was eliminated after having received four previous votes in her time in the game to Joel's zero.
12	12	"Who's the Odd Man Out?"	Days 34-35	8 May 2002
The morning after Jane was voted off, Katie and Sophie discussed how they were going to further themselves in the game, and were shocked and surprised at Sciona and Rob flipping on their alliance. Sciona later lied to Sophie, telling her that their alliance of four still stood strong and Joel would be the next to go.: Reward challenge: Survivors had to use a shark hook to retrieve a net with a crate inside. They had to smash the crate open with a rock to get a pile of letter tiles, some of which they had to arrange (but not all) to correctly form a mystery word (Aurora). The first person to get it right won a camp bed, teddy bear, and roast chicken delivered to camp.; Katie won reward. Sophie and Katie met in secret to discuss their new strategy. They made a plan to confess everything to Joel about their alliance of four and to have him flip to their side, therefore leaving Rob and Sciona the next two to be voted out. Rob found Katie and Sophie in the bushes talking and immediately confronted them.: Immunity challenge: The immunity challenge was a series of obstacles set over six rounds. In the first round, each tribe member was blindfolded and had to escape a maze, with the last person eliminated. In the second round, castaways had to arrange six poles to form four triangles, with the first to finish getting to choose who stood inside each of four traps. Whoever got the working trap would be out. The third round was a three-level Tower Of Hanoi puzzle with life rings hooked around poles, with the first to finish choosing which of three ‘tiger traps’ each player crawled into. Whoever got the working trap was out. The final round was throwing juggling balls into a hollowed-out torch. The first to get a ball chose which of two planks over a gully each person would cross. Whoever got the falling plank was out, leaving the other person as the winner.; Katie won immunity. Sciona was nervous after hearing her name brought up to be voted out. Rob solidified his unity with Sciona and promised her that he would not be voting with Katie and Sophie and that Joel would be voting with them. While Joel was strongly considering both sides, he was still unsure heading into Tribal Council. In the end, Joel decided to stick with Rob and Sciona, sending Sophie to the jury.
13	13	"Finale/Reunion"	Days 36-39	15 May 2002
A visibly overwhelmed Katie immediately attacked Rob verbally, calling him a "gutless wonder", "dishonest" and "dumb as dog shit". The next day, Katie apologised to Sciona, Rob and Joel for her comments from the previous night, only to get into another verbal disagreement with Rob.: Reward challenge: Castaways had to use a plank to cross a grid of stumps around a lighthouse, each with a pole attached to it. They then had to find their four coloured pegs and a coloured flag before getting to the lighthouse. They had to put the pegs in the lighthouse, climb it, and stick their flag in the top. The first person to do so won ice cream and an advantage in the upcoming immunity challenge.; Katie won reward.: Immunity challenge: Tribe members participated in a multiple-choice quiz about the season’s challenges. For each wrong answer, they had to move backwards one space on their plank, eventually falling in the water. The last person left standing would win immunity. Due to winning the previous reward challenge, Katie had an advantage of passing on any one question she didn't wish to answer.; Rob won immunity. After the immunity challenge, Katie approached Joel and asked him to vote for Sciona, while Sciona and Rob would vote for either of them, then in the case of a tie, a countback of votes would happen and Sciona would be eliminated. Katie also approached Sciona and asked why she was being ousted and Joel had replaced her, asking her to vote for Joel. Sciona then informed her that she, Rob and Joel had a final three deal and insisted that she would not tell Katie any further information. Katie immediately walked up the beach where Joel and Rob were sitting and confronted Rob, asking him if he also thought that she didn't deserve the money. Rob called out Katie and asked her why she had just approached Joel with a deal to vote Sciona, which outraged Sciona. While Joel sat quietly, Rob, Sciona and Katie were involved in a huge verbal blow-up causing Katie to walk back to camp alone, refusing to play, sleep, or eat with them and having an emotional breakdown. None of Katie's plans was taken seriously, and she was voted out in a unanimous vote.: Final Immunity challenge: Hidden from their fellow players via steel walls, tribunates had to build a fire to light a lantern, then hang the lantern up as close to 38 minutes after the challenge began as possible.; Rob won immunity, and there was an immediate Tribal Council directly after the challenge. He chose to take Sciona to the final two, eliminating Joel. Following Tribal Council, Rob and Sciona participated in the traditional Rites of Passage, paying their respects to each of the eliminated castaways. On day thirty-nine, Rob and Sciona faced the Tribal Council Jury and stated their reasons as to why they should win the title of Sole Survivor. Naomi asked both finalists why, coming from Kadina where loyalty was respected more, she should vote for them. Both replied with a similar outlook, saying they had treated the game like a board game (Rob), or a game of chess (Sciona). Craig asked Rob and Sciona to describe each other's gameplay up until Day 39. Katie asked if both finalists thought that greed, dishonour and cowardice were correct words to describe how they had played to get to where they were. Lance asked what was the single most positive thing they had learnt about themselves in their time in the competition. Jane asked what both would do with their prize money. Sophie asked both Rob and Sciona why their opponents thought they should win the game. Joel asked if they had any regrets about their time in the game. The jury voted and the votes were sealed, to be read live at Melbourne's Crown Casino. When the votes were read, it was revealed that the jury voted for Rob as the first ever Australian Sole Survivor in a 5-2 vote. Rob earned the respect and votes of the jury as he was honest and prepared with his answers to the jury and although he broke a few alliances, he could specify why he did. While Sciona was also shown admiration from the jury for her gameplay and survival skills, she was unable to win the favor of as many jurors as Rob. Following the reveal of the results, the 16 castaways were joined by Eddie McGuire, to talk about their time at Whaler's Way.

== Voting history ==
	Original tribes						Merged tribe									
Episode #	1	2	3	4	5	6	7	8	9	10	11			12	13	
Day #	3	6	9	12	15	18	21	24	27	30	33			35	37	38
Eliminated	Lucinda	Tim	David	Jeff	Deborah	Sylvan	Caren	Naomi	Craig	Lance	Tie (Note: The first Tribal Council vote resulted in a tie. Per the rules, a second vote was held where the castaways involved in the tie would not vote and the remaining castaways could only vote for those who tied.)	Tie (Note: As the revote could not resolve the tied vote, a Tribal Council countback was called. Joel received no votes from earlier Tribal Councils while Jane received four, eliminating her from the game.)	Jane	Sophie	Katie	Joel
Votes	8-0	4–1–1–1	5–1	5–3	3–2	3–1	7–2–1	7–1–1	7–1	5–1–1	3–3	2–2	Countback	3–2	3–1	1–0
Voter	Vote															
Rob				Jeff			Caren	Naomi	Craig	Lance	Jane	Jane		Sophie	Katie	Joel
Sciona				Jane			Caren	Naomi	Craig	Lance	Jane	Jane		Sophie	Katie	None (Note: Joel and Sciona were not eligible to vote as the only eligible players they could vote for were each other, canceling both votes out.)
Joel				Jeff			Caren	Naomi	Craig	Jane	Jane	None (Note: Joel and Jane were not eligible to vote in the second Tribal Council vote.)	0 votes	Sophie	Katie	None
Katie				Jane			Caren	Naomi	Craig	Lance	Joel	Joel		Rob	Joel	
Sophie				Jeff			Caren	Naomi	Craig	Lance	Joel	Joel		Rob		
Jane				Jeff			Caren	Naomi	Craig	Lance	Joel	None	4 votes			
Lance				Jeff			Caren	Naomi	Craig	Sciona						
Craig	Lucinda	David	David		Deborah	Sylvan	Rob	Rob	Rob							
Naomi	Lucinda	Tim	David		Deborah	Sylvan	Lance	Lance								
Caren	Lucinda	Tim	David		Deborah	Sylvan	Lance									
Sylvan	Lucinda	Tim	David		Caren	Naomi										
Deborah	Lucinda	Tim	David		Caren											
Jeff				Jane												
David	Lucinda	Caren	Craig													
Tim	Lucinda	Deborah														
Lucinda	Lucinda															

Final vote
Episode #	13	
Day #	39	
Finalist	Rob	Sciona
Votes	5–2	
Juror	Vote	
Joel	Rob	
Katie		Sciona
Sophie	Rob	
Jane	Rob	
Lance	Rob	
Craig		Sciona
Naomi	Rob	

== Controversy and criticisms ==
The program received a large amount of criticism from fans of the American series, mainly centred on how this series was of lesser quality when compared to the American series.

The casting process was criticised for lacking diversity, with the cast almost entirely composed of 16 white middle-class Australians, very few of whom were there to "play the game". This lack of drive was especially evident in contestant Lucinda Allen-Rhodes, who not only asked to be voted off, but also was one of the very few people to cast a vote against herself at Tribal Council. In most other editions of Survivor, contestants cannot vote against themselves.

The nature of the camp life of the castaways was also criticised. The tribes were limited on which days they could go search for food. Tipara could go to the coast and fish, while Kadina could only go to the windmill and pump water, and on the next day, the tribes swapped. Additionally, the producers were also criticised for giving the contestants too many supplies.

The show also resulted in criticism in how the network aired the American series. Nine advertised that Survivor US: Marquesas would air after the Australian series. Australian fans were upset when Nine decided not to broadcast Marquesas. It was skipped and instead, the network aired Survivor US: Thailand. In late 2018, Marquesas was made legally available to Australian viewers via the 10 All Access streaming platform, which includes all prior seasons of the American edition.

In New Zealand, both Australian Survivor and Survivor: Marquesas aired concurrently.

== Ratings ==
Although the show started off with satisfying ratings, it eventually declined to dismal ratings (possibly due to the popularity of another reality TV show, The Mole, which aired on Channel Seven an hour earlier at 7:30pm for all but four weeks of the Australian Survivor run). This showed especially when Nine decided to air the special, Surviving Survivor, in a late-night timeslot a fortnight after the conclusion of the series.
