= Australian Survivor season 2 =

Australian Survivor
- Season 2
- Presented by: Ian "Dicko" Dickson
- No. of days: 25
- No. of castaways: 12
- Winner: Guy Leech
- Runner-up: Justin Melvey
- Location: Efate, Shefa Province, Vanuatu
- No. of episodes: 12

Release
- Original network: Seven Network
- Original release: 17 August – 2 November 2006

Additional information
- Filming dates: May – June 2006

Season chronology
- ← Previous; Season 1 (2002) (on the Nine Network) Next → Season 3 (2016) (on Network Ten)

The second season of Australian Survivor, also known as Australian Celebrity Survivor and Celebrity Survivor: Vanuatu, is a television series based on the international reality competition franchise Survivor. The season featured 12 Australian celebrity contestants competing on the Vanuatuan island of Éfaté over 25 days for a grand prize of A$100,000 for the winner's chosen charity. It was hosted by television personality and former record company executive Ian "Dicko" Dickson.

After 25 days on the island, surf lifesaving champion Guy Leech was named the "Sole Survivor" in a 3–2 jury vote over actor Justin Melvey. Guy donated his A$100,000 charity prize to Ride Aid Inc while the charities of the other players each received a donation of A$5,000.

The season aired on the Seven Network in 2006, the same year the network aired other celebrity-oriented reality programs including It Takes Two and Dancing with the Stars. Although better received than the Nine Network's 2002 season, Seven's Celebrity Survivor series was still only a modest success in the ratings and was not renewed by the Seven Network. A third Australian Survivor was not produced until 10 years later when Network Ten picked up the rights to the franchise and produced a third season which aired in 2016.

== Production ==
=== Conception ===
In 2006, Nine Network held the rights to screen the American edition of Survivor and the licence to produce a local edition of Survivor, which resulted in Nine's 2002 edition of Australian Survivor. However, the Seven Network used a loophole in their contract and obtained the rights to produce Australian Celebrity Survivor, as Castaway Television views the Celebrity Survivor format as a different format from the regular format. The series was commissioned 6 weeks before the filming commenced.

Castaway Television, which produced Nine's series, was again involved in the production of the second Australian season of "Survivor."

=== Filming and development ===
The show was filmed on the island of Éfaté in Vanuatu, which was used for the 9th season of the American edition (Survivor US: Vanuatu – Islands of Fire) and the 6th season of the French edition (Koh-Lanta: Vanuatu), with the Production using many of the sets and challenge equipment from those season, notably using the same Tribal Council set as the American version.

Production of the series took place over twenty-five days, from late May to early June 2006, with the cast finalised 36 hours before the first Day of filming. The executive producer of Celebrity Survivor was David Mason, who also produced other shows on the Seven Network, such as Medical Emergency, Who Dares Wins and The Mole.

=== Promotion ===
Before the series began, Dickson and a few of the Celebrity Survivor contestants appeared on the Seven Network's breakfast news show, Sunrise, to promote the series. This paralleled what occurs in the American version, when the show is promoted on The Early Show, CBS' own breakfast news program, and what happened during the Nine Network's Australian Survivor venture, when the series was featured on the early morning show, Today and A Current Affair. Two of the season's contestants, Amber Petty and Nicolle Dickson, also appeared in television commercials for Olay Total Effects, which were broadcast during the series.

== Contestants ==
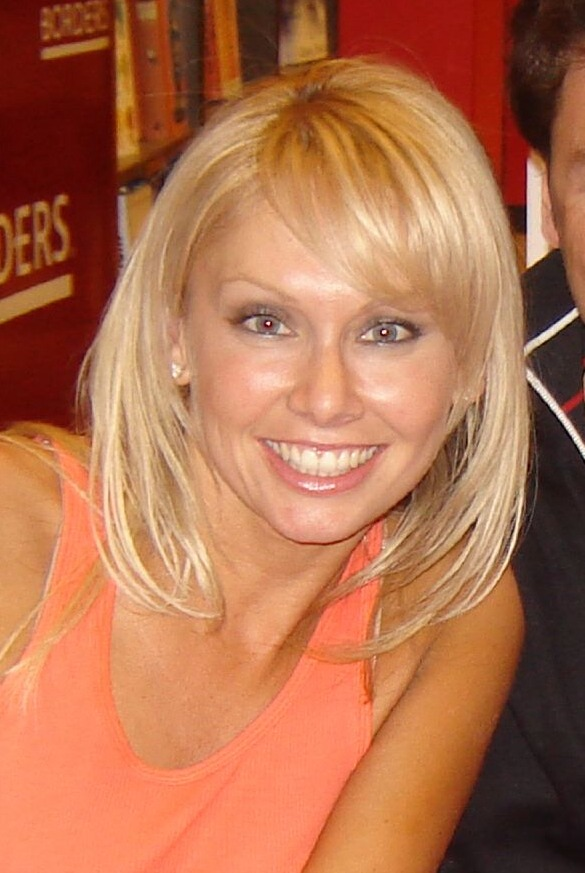
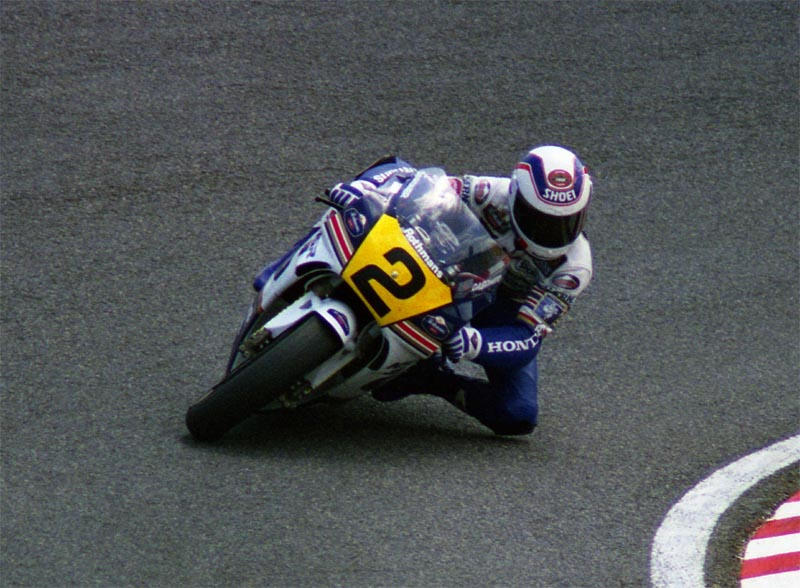
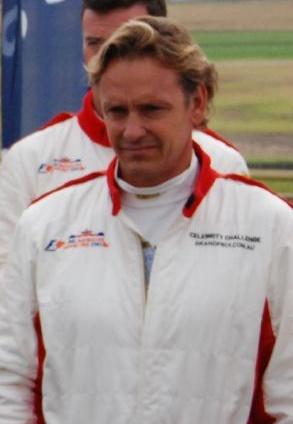
From left to right: Kym Johnson, Wayne Gardner and Guy Leech

On Day 1, nine of the twelve players were divided based on gender into two tribes. The five women composed the Moso tribe and the four men made up the Kakula tribe. Later on Day 1, a player of the opposite gender joined each tribe. On Day 3, for winning the first immunity challenge, Kakula received a former soldier and survival expert as their sixth tribe member. On Day 6, the ten remaining players were redistributed into two mixed-gender tribes of five.

On Day 12, the seven remaining players merged into the Tanna tribe. These players made up the two finalists and the five members of the jury, who ultimately decided who would be the "Sole Survivor".

List of Australian Survivor season 2 contestants
| Contestant | Charity | Original tribe | Switched tribe | Merged tribe | Finish |
|---|---|---|---|---|---|
| Kym Johnson; 29, Dancing with the Stars Dancer | Merry Makers; Australia | Moso | | | 1st voted out Day 3 |
| Benjamin "Ben" Wynn; 32, Ex-S.A.S. soldier | None (Note: Ben was a "survival expert" who joined the game on Day 3 as a reward to the tribe who won the first immunity challenge; as he was not a celebrity, he was not playing for charity.) | Kakula | | | 2nd voted out Day 5 |
| Fiona Horne; 39, Singer | Project Aware | Moso | Moso | | 3rd voted out Day 7 |
| Amber Petty; 35, Entertainment Reporter | Australian; Red Cross | Moso | Moso | | 4th voted out Day 9 |
| Wayne Gardner; 46, Motorcycle Racer | Royal Alexandra; Hospital for Children | Kakula | Kakula | | 5th voted out Day 11 |
| Guy Leech; Returned to game on Day 20 | Ride Aid Inc | Kakula | Kakula | Tanna | 6th voted out Removed from the jury (Note: The first four jury members (Guy, Elton, Justin and Gabrielle) competed in a challenge to re-enter the game on Day 20; Guy and Justin won the challenge, and were removed from the jury.); Day 13 |
| Elton Flatley; 28, Rugby Union Player | Royal Children's; Hospital Foundation | Kakula | Moso | Tanna | 7th voted out 1st jury member Day 15 |
| Justin Melvey; Returned to game on Day 20 | Diabetes Australia | Moso | Moso | Tanna | 8th voted out Removed from the jury Day 17 |
| Gabrielle Richens; 31, Model & TV Presenter | The Wayside; Chapel Foundation | Kakula | Kakula | Tanna | 9th voted out 2nd jury member Day 19 |
| David Oldfield; 47, Politician | Legacy Foundation | Kakula | Moso | Tanna | 10th voted out 3rd jury member Day 21 |
| Nicolle Dickson; 37, Actress | Starlight Children's; Foundation | Moso | Kakula | Tanna | 11th voted out 4th jury member Day 23 |
| Imogen Bailey; 28, Actress & Model | Cambodia; Foundation | Moso | Kakula | Tanna | 12th voted out 5th jury member Day 24 |
| Justin Melvey; 37, Actor | Diabetes; Australia | Moso | Moso | Tanna | Runner-up; Day 25 |
| Guy Leech; 42, Surf Lifesaving Champion | Ride Aid Inc | Kakula | Kakula | Tanna | Sole Survivor; Day 25 |

== Season summary ==
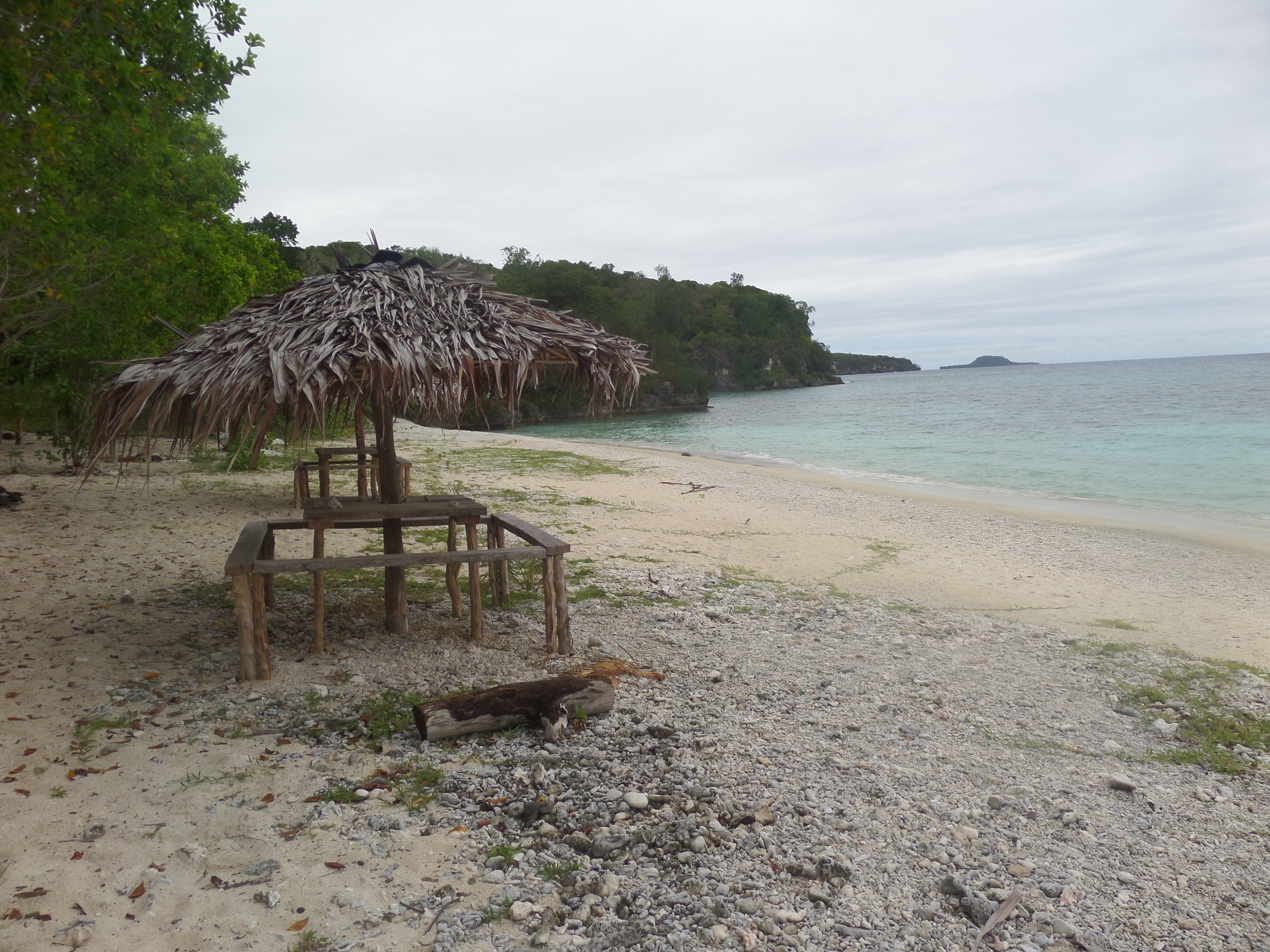
The season was filmed on the island of Efate in Vanuatu.

Nine of the twelve celebrity castaways were divided into two tribes based on gender: Kakula (men) and Moso (women). A player of the opposite gender joined each tribe later on day 1 (Justin on Moso and Gabrielle on Kakula), and Kakula won an additional tribe member for winning the first immunity challenge ("survival expert" Ben). A tribe swap on day 6 sent David & Elton to Moso and Imogen & Nicolle to Kakula, and the tribes merged into the Tanna tribe on day 12.

Initially, the players joined forces to eliminate Guy first, for being the most obvious physical threat, and Elton soon followed for the same reason. The tribe turned on Justin due to him allegedly making a monetary deal with Gabrielle for him to remain in the game, and Gabrielle was the next to go after her ally. The first four voted out since the merge competed for a chance to re-enter the game, with Guy and Justin emerging victorious. David, Imogen, and Nicolle's attempts to vote the two of them out again due to their newfound threat status were futile, and they were all eliminated by Guy and Justin, who reached the final two. In the end, the jury sided with Guy, and he won the prize money for his charity.

Challenge winners and eliminations by episode
| Episode | | Challenge winner(s) | | Eliminated | Finish |
| No. | Air date | Reward | Immunity | Eliminated | Finish |
|---|---|---|---|---|---|
| 1 | 17 August 2006 | Kakula | Kakula (Note: The immunity challenge included an additional reward in the form of a new tribe member, "survival expert" Ben.) | Kym | 1st voted out Day 3 |
| 2 | 24 August 2006 | Kakula (Note: Kakula chose to give part of their reward to Moso.) | Moso | Ben | 2nd voted out Day 5 |
| 3 | 31 August 2006 | Moso | Kakula | Fiona | 3rd voted out Day 7 |
| 4 | 7 September 2006 | Kakula | Kakula | Amber | 4th voted out Day 9 |
| 5 | 14 September 2006 | Moso | Moso | Wayne | 5th voted out Day 11 |
| 6 | 21 September 2006 | Guy [Elton, Gabrielle] | David | Guy | 6th voted out ~~1st Jury Member~~ (Note: The first four jury members (Guy, Elton, Justin and Gabrielle) competed in a challenge to re-enter the game on Day 20; Guy and Justin won the challenge, and were removed from the jury.); Day 13 |
| 7 | 28 September 2006 | David, Gabrielle, Imogen | David | Elton | 7th voted out 2nd Jury Member; Day 15 |
| 8 | 5 October 2006 | Nicolle [Imogen] | ~~Imogen~~ [Nicolle] (Note: At Tribal Council, Imogen chose to give her immunity to Nicolle.) | Justin | 8th voted out ~~3rd Jury Member~~; Day 17 |
| 9 | 12 October 2006 | Nicolle | David (Note: The castaways and their loved ones competed as teams for immunity; David and his wife Lisa won, thus earning immunity for David.) | Gabrielle | 9th voted out 4th Jury Member; Day 19 |
| 10 | 19 October 2006 | Guy, Justin | Imogen | David | 10th voted out 5th jury member Day 21 |
| 11 | 26 October 2006 | Guy [Imogen, Justin] | Guy | Nicolle | 11th voted out 6th jury member Day 23 |
| 12 | 2 November 2006 | None | Justin | Imogen | 12th voted out 7th jury member Day 24 |
| 12 | 2 November 2006 | | | Final vote | |
| 12 | 2 November 2006 | | | Justin | Runner-up; Day 25 |
| 12 | 2 November 2006 | | | Guy | Sole Survivor; Day 25 |

In the case of multiple tribes or castaways who win reward or immunity, they are listed in order of finish, or alphabetically where it was a team effort; where one castaway won and invited others, the invitees are in brackets.

== Episodes ==
| No. overall | No. in season | Title | Timeline | Original release date |
|---|---|---|---|---|
| 14 | 1 | "Episode 1" | Days 1-3 | 17 August 2006 |
Nine of the twelve celebrity cast members begun the game by meeting host Dicko on a yacht. They were divided into two tribes based on their gender (Kakula for the men and Moso for the women) and were then transported to their designated tribe beaches by local Vanuatuan tribes. Upon arriving at their beach, the Moso tribe was initially surprised that they were given absolutely no camping equipment or tents. Kym especially expressed her shock that they had to build their own shelter, and mentioned that she had never been camping before. Over at the Kakula tribe, Guy, David and Wayne immediately started to make plans to build their shelter before they ran out of daylight. Shortly after both tribes began setting up camp, both tribes were surprised with an additional tribe member. Justin arrived on a boat and became a part of the all-female Moso tribe, and Gabrielle arrived and joined the male Kakula tribe. Both brought the following items with them: saucepans, flint and machetes.: Reward challenge: Each tribe member must swim out into the ocean and retrieve a floating trunk by untying a knot underwater. When all tribe members have retrieved their trunks, tribes can then open all five trunks and collect fifteen pieces of a traditional Vanuatuan sculpture. The first tribe to vertically assemble all pieces on a pole will win a large fresh salmon and fishing supplies.; Kakula won the challenge. At Moso, Imogen was annoyed by Fiona whom she thought had taken on a boisterous leader role, while Fiona pulled Amber aside saying she wanted to vote out Imogen first because she was their weakest link in challenges.: Immunity challenge: Each tribe member must enter a pig pen with thirty pigs inside and catch a pig with their tribe colour on it. The first tribe to collect five pigs will win immunity. There was also a reward component added to this challenge; Ben was introduced, and will join the team who wins the challenge. Ben had just returned from Iraq serving in the S.A.S, and is a jungle survival expert.; Once again, Kakula won the challenge. Before Tribal Council, Fiona approached Justin and asked him if he was thinking of voting Imogen also to which he agreed. Kym was also struggling with the elements and stated that she didn't want to vote anybody out. Eventually, Kym was voted out in a unanimous vote, also voting for herself.
| 15 | 2 | "Episode 2" | Days 4-5 | 24 August 2006 |
Waking up on day 4, the Moso tribe was suffering from being starved and fatigued, especially Imogen who felt dizzy when she left the shelter and vomited. Over at Kakula, life was quite the opposite, having a plentiful food source and even making their own toothbrushes thanks to the expertise of Ben.: Reward challenge: Both tribes must fill a glass bottle with coconut juice to a marked line. One at a time each member must crack a coconut, empty the juice into a coconut shell and make their way through an obstacle course to the glass bottle at the end. The first tribe to do so wins a luxury camping bed and an array of tropical fruits.; Kakula won reward, but opted to give half of their fruit to Moso. Most of the Moso tribe enjoyed their fruit and appreciated the kind gesture from Kakula, while Fiona refused to eat any of the fruit and stated that she was fine living solely off the food they had themselves acquired. She also ranted that they were doing well enough and that they didn't need any handouts. Later on in the jungle, while hunting for food, Fiona and Nicolle agreed that they would vote for Imogen if they lost the next immunity challenge. At Kakula, Wayne and Gabrielle spoke about possibly voting off Ben as he was the last person to join their team.: Immunity challenge: Searching through a field of twenty-four covered baskets, celebrities must find an item and their matching label written in typical Vanuatu language. The first tribe to acquire five pairs will win immunity.; Moso won their first challenge of the season. Before heading to their first Tribal Council, Wayne, Guy, Elton and Gabrielle were hesitant to vote out Ben, because he was their number one source of survival. They considered turning on each other, and Wayne later approached Guy to ask him if voting out Gabrielle was a possibility. In the end, Ben was voted out in a 5–1 vote.
| 16 | 3 | "Episode 3" | Days 6-7 | 31 August 2006 |
Waking up on day 6, Fiona discovered fruit flies through the tribe's fruit bag and ranted about the tribe not listening to her, getting into a disagreement with Amber. Fiona continued to rub her tribemates the wrong way throughout the day. Heading into the reward challenge, Justin and Gabrielle (the last two cast members to arrive on day one) were assigned to designated mats, Gabrielle to Kakula and Justin to Moso. Gabrielle selected a male first, with Justin selecting a female first and alternating until two new tribes formed.: Reward challenge: Tribes must place an item on the end of a board, and jump on the opposite end to catapult the item into a basket above them. The first tribe to successfully place all five items in their basket will win reward. The items that the celebrities are aiming to put in the basket are the items they will win, consisting of rice, herbs, spices, potatoes, tinned beef and tomatoes. An additional item, an outdoor kitchen with cooking utensils, is also up for grabs.; Moso won reward. Imogen & Nicolle were in the minority on Kakula, and David & Elton were in the minority on Moso; original tribal lines held strong. When arriving at their new camp, Imogen heard Guy and Wayne saying that they would use them for information and then get rid of them.: Immunity challenge: Four tribe members will be locked in a cage as "prisoners", with one tribe member being a "rescuer". The rescuers must run through a marked path in the jungle to receive their tribe flags, then run back to the prison and free the first prisoner. To enter the prison, the rescuer must dig underneath the bamboo wall; once they have freed the first prisoner, they must then continue on to free the next prisoner from their cage where there are bamboo sticks and rope. They must make a pole long enough to reach a key which will unlock the door to their next prison cage and ultimately unlock the final two prisoners and win immunity for their tribe.; Kakula won the challenge. At Moso, Elton and David targeted Fiona for her weakness and annoyance, and Fiona and Justin targeted David for making them lose the immunity challenge. Amber was a swing vote and unsure of how to vote. At Tribal Council, she decided to betray her original Moso alliance and voted with the former Kakula members, sending Fiona out of the game.
| 17 | 4 | "Episode 4" | Days 8-9 | 7 September 2006 |
On day 8 at Kakula, Wayne and Guy became suspicious of Gabrielle becoming closer with Imogen and Nicolle, fearing that they would form an all girls alliance and they would be the next two to go.: Reward challenge: One tribe member will have their hands tied to a rope via a metal hoop. The rest of the tribe must assist this tribe member over a series of obstacles. At the last obstacle, the selected tribe member will retrieve a key, go back through the obstacle course to the beginning and unlock themselves. The first tribe to unlock their tribe member wins oil, saucepans, lemons and two roast chickens.; Kakula won reward. Talk continued regarding Gabrielle's loyalty to Guy and Wayne. Nicolle and Imogen were hopeful that Gabrielle would flip and vote with them, while Wayne became more confident that she wouldn't, assuming that they would physically struggle in the future challenges without any brawn.: Immunity challenge: Each tribe has a platform over the ocean with eight rings at one end. They must transfer all eight rings to the other side of their platform. One at a time, a tribe member will cross the plank with a ring, while the rest of their tribe members will be in the middle, which they have to go around without falling off. The first tribe to take all eight rings to the other side wins immunity.; Kakula won the challenge. Before heading to Tribal Council, the Moso tribe was in disorganisation; Amber was worried that she would be next voted out for flipping on her alliance at the previous Tribal Council. Although Justin promised his loyalty to her, he was paranoid that she would vote with Elton and David against him. Elton and David remained strong and Justin decided to vote with them, voting out Amber in a unanimous vote.
| 18 | 5 | "Episode 5" | Days 10-11 | 14 September 2006 |
Torrential rain awoke a sleeping Kakula tribe on night 9, and they were forced to wake and fix their shelter to avoid being wet. The next day, Gabrielle stated that she felt sorry for the Moso tribe because they didn't have a very strong shelter to which Wayne told her that if she felt so sorry for them, she could go over and join them. Guy showed concern as Gabrielle was a swing vote and her run-ins with Wayne could cause her to flip and vote with Nicolle and Imogen.: Reward challenge: One tribe member must fill a bucket with water, run to a mat and throw the bucket to a second tribe member. That tribe member must then throw only the water to a third tribe member holding an empty bucket who must then climb a ladder and pour that water into a larger bucket. Once the final bucket has enough water, it will begin to drop, raising a tribe flag. The first tribe to raise their flag wins steak with three sauces (béarnaise, peppercorn and mushroom), and waterproof ponchos for each tribe member.; Moso won reward.: Immunity challenge: This challenge occurs in three stages. In stage one each tribe will have three members chained together with bags of weight on their back, they must continue to run in a loop to avoid being caught by the other tribe from behind but attempt to reach them from behind first. In the second round, only two tribe members will compete and in the third round only one tribe member. The first tribe to win two of three rounds will win immunity.; Moso won immunity. At Kakula before Tribal Council, Imogen and Nicolle approached Gabrielle and attempted to cement an all girls alliance, targeting Wayne. Wayne and Guy were confident that Gabrielle would stick with them and vote out Imogen. Gabrielle was torn between joining her original alliance or siding with the women. In the end, she betrayed Guy and Wayne, helping Imogen and Nicolle take out Wayne.
| 19 | 6 | "Episode 6" | Days 12-13 | 21 September 2006 |
Kakula awoke to tree mail on day 12 informing them that they had ten minutes to take everything they could fit onto a canoe and head to the Moso camp. While Moso was cooking breakfast, David looked up and realised a group of canoes arriving, confirming a merge. The remaining Moso tribe were instantly shocked when they realised that Gabrielle had flipped, and voted out Wayne.: Reward challenge: On Dicko's signal, each tribe member must swim out into the ocean where there is a buoy with five conches on the ocean floor. They must retrieve a conch; the last two people without a conch are out of the challenge, and the remaining five must repeat the same section of the challenge. However, there will only be three conches to retrieve. The third round is the same, except castaways must retrieve one of three treasure chests and bring it back to shore. The first person back to shore with their treasure chest will win a visit to a traditional village with a feast on home-cooked food.; Guy won and was allowed to take two people to join him on reward; he chose Gabrielle and Elton. On the newly merged Tanna tribe, while Gabrielle, Elton and Guy were enjoying the reward, David went for a walk with Imogen and proposed to her that he and Elton, who were tightly aligned, join her and Nicolle and make a strong alliance of four.: Immunity challenge: Each tribe member has their own empty ladder. One at a time they must select two separate rungs from their pile and give one each to two different tribe members. The first tribe member who has all six rungs in their ladder, can climb to the top and retrieve immunity.; David won immunity. Talk immediately began surrounding who would be ousted at the first merged Tribal Council. Nicolle, Gabrielle and Justin discussed voting out Guy because he was the biggest physical threat left. Guy and Elton felt that it would be either of them being voted out. In the end, Guy was voted out with a vote of 5-2.
| 20 | 7 | "Episode 7" | Days 14-15 | 28 September 2006 |
Talk started to arise around the Tanna camp about Gabrielle's lack of work ethic. While all of the other members of the tribe regularly worked around camp and maintaining the fire, Gabrielle just sat around which caused Nicolle to mention that she would talk to Gabrielle about the issue.: Reward challenge: This challenge is called "The Vanuatu Volcano". The remaining six Tanna tribe members will be split into two teams of three. Each team starts with one pole with five life rings stacked in the shape of a volcano. They have two other empty poles as well. The object is to transfer their "Volcano" from the starting pole to either of the other two; however, they cannot stack a large life ring on top of a smaller one. The winning team gets an overnight stay at a private overnight villa with a full banquet, massages, shower and laundry.; The team of David, Imogen and Gabrielle won immunity. When they returned from their reward the next morning, David was not impressed to discover that in his absence Justin had stepped up to cook David's signature "Island Porridge" and also broke one of his pots. Elton and David also discussed their hopes that the majority of four would turn on each other; otherwise, it would be one of them being voted out next.: Immunity challenge: Puzzle challenge. Each person must memorise a dynamic puzzle and the colours on it, then recreate it. They will have fifteen seconds to view the puzzle. If they are wrong they're out of the challenge; if they are correct, they will move on for another round. The puzzle will stay the same each round, but the colour configuration will change. The last person standing will win immunity.; David won his second individual immunity. Before Tribal Council, Elton was confident that he would be voted out due to being the most obvious physical threat. David approached Nicolle and proposed that they vote out Gabrielle for being lazy around camp. Nicolle suggested that Imogen would vote with her, as would Elton. However, she was not sure which way she would vote. Nicolle decided not to approach anyone else about the possibility of voting for Gabrielle, instead joining the majority in voting Elton out.
| 21 | 8 | "Episode 8" | Days 16-17 | 5 October 2006 |
Upon returning from Tribal Council, David was nervous about being the sole outsider of the former Moso alliance, plus Gabrielle. Ahead of the reward challenge, Nicolle and Justin made a deal to take each other on the reward should they win.: Reward challenge: The reward challenge was split into 3 rounds, with the losers of each round being eliminated. The first was a commando crawl race through a mud pit, the second round was a one-on-one tug-of-war on floating pontoons, and the final round was a fire-making duel where the remaining two castaways had to make a fire high enough to burn a rope, which would drop a bucket of water on the other castaway's fire. The winner would be taken by helicopter to nearby Pentecost Island, where they would witness a traditional land dive ritual while enjoying a traditional feast.; Nicolle won the final round against Justin. Nicolle was told to take another castaway, and she debated whether to honour the prior deal or take her friend Imogen. Ultimately, she chose to take Imogen, which upset Justin because she did not honour the earlier deal. Back at camp, David observed the closeness of Gabrielle and Justin, as they are often together in camp activities. While searching for food, Justin and Gabrielle grew closer together. Following their return to camp, Nicolle and Imogen speculated that Gabrielle and Justin would betray their alliance of 4 and that Gabrielle had been asked by Justin to remain in the game to advance Justin in the game.: Immunity challenge: Each castaway has a column of 3 tiles on a board. One at a time each castaway had to shoot the other player's tiles with a slingshot. The last castaway with tiles intact wins immunity.; Justin was the first to be eliminated, followed by David and Nicolle. Imogen won immunity by taking out Gabrielle's last tile. Following the immunity challenge, David was nervous about being voted off as the outsider to the alliance. However, Nicolle and Imogen considered eliminating Justin after speculation that Justin had made a monetary deal to Gabrielle to remain in the game and to play for his benefit. At Tribal Council, Imogen publicly brought up the speculation of Justin's bribing of Gabrielle and the fact that Justin had been in the dominant position in the alliance of 4. Additionally, she gave immunity to alliance-mate Nicolle to not "hide behind" having immunity while making such allegations. While Justin voted against Imogen, the remainder of the tribe (including Gabrielle) turned on Justin to vote him out.
| 22 | 9 | "Episode 9" | Days 18-19 | 12 October 2006 |
After returning from Tribal Council without Justin and with the end in sight, Gabrielle felt that she was now in the game to win for herself. The next morning, Imogen and Nicolle talked about getting rid of David to form an all-female Final 3. At the challenge site, Dicko surprised the Final 4 with their respective loved ones.: Reward challenge: At the challenge site, there were tam-tams decorated to look like each castaway. Each castaway must fill out a questionnaire that asks personal information and private opinions on others. Then, they must vote on what they think the most common answer would be. Each castaway who answers a question correctly would be allowed to cut a section of rope connected to the swinging log of the castaway they wanted to be eliminated. Three cuts of the rope would send the logs smashing into the tam-tams. The last person left with their tam-tams intact wins reward. The reward was an overnight stay in a villa with their loved-one.; Gabrielle was eliminated first, followed by Imogen. David cut his own rope to give the reward to Nicolle. Upon returning to camp, Nicolle felt indebted to David and wanted him to win immunity as she knew that she would have to vote him off if he didn't. At the immunity challenge, Dicko once again surprised the Final 4 with their loved ones, who will assist them in the immunity challenge.: Immunity challenge: The challenge was a relay race and each partnership could divide the work however they wanted. The castaways and their loved one must race to a series of tall wooden towers in the water and climb to the top. Then they must retrieve a flag, and jump off the tower and race to the beach. The first partnership to bring four flags to the beach wins immunity for their castaway.; David and his wife Lisa won the challenge, giving him immunity. With David immune and Nicolle and Imogen not voting for each other, Gabrielle was resigned to the fact that she would most likely be voted out that night. However, she considered aligning with David to force a tie and break up the pair (which would result in a countback as Imogen and Nicolle both had more prior votes). However, David was reluctant to talk strategy with her. At Tribal Council, David sided with the Nicolle and Imogen to vote off Gabrielle.
| 23 | 10 | "Episode 10" | Days 20-21 | 19 October 2006 |
Back at camp, Nicolle and Imogen were thankful for David keeping the pair in the game but were wary of his ulterior motives. David was glad to have formed a strong bond with the pair, as he figured there would be a twist of some variety, as there were too few castaways and too many days left. At the challenge site, Dicko surprised the Final 3 with the four jury members, telling them that the jury members would have the chance to return to the game, confirming David's theory.: Battle to return: The battle to return was divided into two parts, with the loser in each round being eliminated. In the first round, Dicko told the jury members the story of Roy Mata. After he finished the story, the four were quizzed on the details of the story. The first to get a question wrong was eliminated from the game. In the second round, Dicko showed the three members a coloured pattern on a gameboard for ten seconds, which the jury members would have to recreate on their own game board. The first jury member to make a mistake would be eliminated from the game.; Gabrielle was eliminated in the first round and Elton was eliminated in the second. Hence, Justin and Guy returned to the game. Back at camp, everyone was wary of their position in the game. The original three were wary of the return of Justin and Guy; Justin for the "Bribery Scandal" a few days earlier, and Guy due to his status as a physical threat in the challenges. The returnees were worried that the original three would stick together to vote off Guy and Justin. Guy talked to David about the fact that it would be better for him to take Guy and Justin forward as they would not win the jury vote, due to being eliminated before. Justin, Imogen and Nicolle patched things up and discussed voting off the strategic threat, David. This discussion got back to David as Guy told him about it. Guy then gathered the other men for a meeting to potentially align with each other to eliminate Imogen and Nicolle.: Immunity challenge: The immunity challenge was divided into two rounds. In the first round, the castaways had to eat three ofta worms. The first three to finish moved on to the next round. In the next round, the three castaways had to dig in a marked section on the beach for a key, which would be used to open a chest. Inside the chest, there would be a grappling hook, would be used to receive a ring with a flag on it. The first castaway to place their flag on a post would win immunity.; David, Imogen and Guy moved onto the second round, where Imogen won immunity. At camp, Imogen reassured David of the alliance of three with Nicolle and agreed to vote off Guy. Imogen and Justin discussed voting off David. This led to Imogen giving Justin her word to vote off David. However, Imogen and Nicolle were still unsure about which way to vote, leaving them as swing votes. At Tribal Council, the girls ultimately sided with Guy and Justin to vote off David.
| 24 | 11 | "Episode 11" | Days 22-23 | 26 October 2006 |
Upon returning from camp, the four remaining castaways discussed the elimination of David. While all were confident in making the correct strategic decision, Nicolle felt bad for not telling David that he would be eliminated. The next morning, the division between the group became clear with Imogen and Nicolle being together and Guy and Justin being another duo. Guy held a tribe meeting to discuss having a "clear fight" for the rest of the game, with the obvious division being in place.: Reward challenge: Each castaway stands on top of a log while they are holding a pole. Supported by the pole is a bucket of water. Should the castaway drop their pole, the bucket will tip over and dump water on the castaway, thus eliminating him or her from the challenge. The last castaway standing wins a once in a lifetime experience to Mount Yasur to witness the active volcano, after which they would be taken to a resort for dinner with Dicko and an overnight stay.; Both of the girls were quick to drop their buckets, leaving Guy and Justin to battle for reward. Justin dropped the pole, giving the reward to Guy. Following the challenge, Guy was told to pick two castaways to join him. He chose Imogen and Justin, leaving Nicolle alone at camp for the night. After the reward, the two pairs privately strategized where they should vote at the upcoming Tribal Council, given the countback tiebreaker rule in place. Nicolle and Imogen wanted to place their votes on Guy due to him having more prior votes than Justin, while Guy and Justin believed that Nicolle had more votes than Imogen.: Immunity challenge: The challenge was a version of shuffleboard. Each castaway will be given five discs. On the board, there was a map of the Vanuatu islands. The castaways must try to get their discs on the islands. However, the castaways may use their discs to knock the other castaways' discs off the islands. The only way to keep a disc safe on an island is to drop it into a volcano on the board. The castaway with the most discs touching the islands wins immunity.; Guy won immunity with four points. With the two pairs being solid, no one was willing to change their allegiances. At Tribal Council, the vote resulted in a tie between Justin and Nicolle. A Tribal Council Countback was called. However, that ended in deadlock with both Justin and Nicolle receiving 4 previous votes. A jury vote was called to resolve the deadlock. By a unanimous vote, the Jury voted out Nicolle, leaving a shocked Imogen in the Final 3 with Guy and Justin.
| 25 | 12 | "Episode 12" | Days 24-25 | 2 November 2006 |
After the previous Tribal Council, Guy and Justin celebrated being in the Final 3, while an emotional Imogen mourned the loss of her alliance-mate and friend, Nicolle. The following morning, the Final 3 left camp to participate in the traditional "Rites of Passage". They walked past the torches of the 9 castaways who had left the game. They lighted each torch to honour each castaway. Following this, the Final 3 went to their final immunity challenge.: Final Immunity challenge: The final three must balance themselves on a small raft floating in the water. They could use their hands and feet for balance but no other body part. After an hour, the castaway could only support themselves on 3 limbs. After the second hour, the castaways could only use two limbs for the remainder of the challenge. The castaways could not lift a supporting limb off the raft or touch the raft with any other body part. The last castaway on their raft would win the final immunity of the season would have the sole vote at the night's Tribal Council.; Just prior to the conclusion of the first hour, Guy briefly lifted his leg from the raft, eliminating him from the challenge. Imogen dropped at the start of the third hour, giving immunity to Justin. At camp, Imogen was worried that Justin would take Guy to the Final 2 but tried to convince Justin that Guy would be a jury threat. At Tribal Council, Justin ultimately chose to vote off Imogen, as he perceived her to be more of a jury threat since she was on the island for the entirety of the game, while both Guy and Justin were not. On day 25, Justin and Guy celebrated with the traditional final 2 breakfast before heading to the final Tribal Council. At the final Tribal Council, the jury members were given an opportunity to question the finalists. David began the questioning, asking Guy why he convinced Nicolle and Imogen that David would betray the pair and how could David vote for Guy given that dishonesty. Guy replied that he was on the chopping block that night and David had to be eliminated but admitted that he was not honest in this instance. Nicolle asked Justin about the "Bribery Scandal" including the monetary reward offered to Nicolle and some other tribemates. He replied that some of his tribemates wanted to quit, which would weaken his position in the game. He told the jury that he felt embarrassed to offer money in the game, and he apologised for the bribery scandal. Gabrielle asked Justin about why she wasn't told about the bribery despite their close relationship both inside and outside of the game. He replied that she didn't want him to. Elton asked Guy about his earlier exit and how someone could win the game despite being eliminated from the game and "enjoying at the buffet". Guy replied that he was simply playing by the rules of the game and his return was a part of said rules and questioned the fairness of the rule. Imogen asked Justin why he was the best person to win the game. Justin responded that he gave the game his best shot, that he had been eliminated for a shorter period than Guy and that it was an honor and a pleasure to play the game with the members of the jury. The finalists were given an opportunity to give their final statements. Guy apologised for anyone he had wronged and being eliminated from the game for 6 days, simply stating, "I am what I am". Justin acknowledged that Survivor a hard game and stated that their friendship was more important than this game. He expressed that he was thankful for the friendships to result from this game. The final jury vote revealed that Guy was named the "Sole Survivor" in a 3–2 vote. He won the votes of Elton, Gabrielle, and David, and was awarded the immunity necklace to symbolise his victory.

== Voting history ==
| | Original tribes | | Switched tribes | | | Merged tribe | | | | | | | | | |
| Episode # | 1 | 2 | 3 | 4 | 5 | 6 | 7 | 8 | 9 | 10 | | 11 | | | 12 |
|---|---|---|---|---|---|---|---|---|---|---|---|---|---|---|---|
| Day # | 3 | 5 | 7 | 9 | 11 | 13 | 15 | 17 | 19 | 20 | 21 | 23 | | | 24 |
| Eliminated | Kym | Ben | Fiona | Amber | Wayne | Guy (Note: Guy & Justin returned to the game via a twist on Day 20) | Elton | Justin | Gabrielle | Gabrielle & Elton | David | Tie (Note: The Tribal Council vote resulted in a tie. Per the rules, a Tribal Council countback was called.) | Tie | Nicolle | Imogen |
| Votes | 6 | 5–1 | 3–2 | 3–1 | 3–2 | 5–2 | 4–1–1 | 4–1 | 3–1 | Challenge | 4–1 | 2–2 | Countback | 3–0 (Note: As the countback ended in deadlock (with both Justin and Nicolle receiving 4 previous votes), the Jury (Elton, Gabrielle and David) voted in order to break the deadlock.) | 1–0 |
| Voter | Vote | | | | | | | | | | | | | | |
| Guy | | Ben | | | Imogen | Nicolle | | | | Won | David | Nicolle | | None | None (Note: Guy and Imogen were not eligible to vote as the only eligible players they could vote for were each other and hence their votes would essentially cancel each other's out.) |
| Justin | Kym | | David | Amber | | Guy | Elton | Imogen | | Won | David | Nicolle | 4 Votes | None | Imogen |
| Imogen | Kym | | | | Wayne | Guy | Elton | Justin | Gabrielle | | David | Justin | | None | None |
| Nicolle | Kym | | | | Wayne | Guy | Elton | Justin | Gabrielle | | David | Justin | 4 Votes | None | |
| David | | Ben | Fiona | Amber | | Guy | Gabrielle | Justin | Gabrielle | | Guy | | | Nicolle | |
| Gabrielle | | Ben | | | Wayne | Guy | Elton | Justin | Nicolle | Lost | | | | Nicolle | |
| Elton | | Ben | Fiona | Amber | | Nicolle | Nicolle | | | Lost | | | | Nicolle | |
| Wayne | | Ben | | | Imogen | | | | | | | | | | |
| Amber | Kym | | Fiona | David | | | | | | | | | | | |
| Fiona | Kym | | David | | | | | | | | | | | | |
| Ben | | Wayne | | | | | | | | | | | | | |
| Kym | Kym | | | | | | | | | | | | | | |

Final Vote
| Episode # | 12 | |
|---|---|---|
| Day # | 25 | |
| Finalist | Guy | Justin |
| Votes | 3–2 | |
| Juror | Vote | |
| Imogen | | Justin |
| Nicolle | | Justin |
| David | Guy | |
| Gabrielle | Guy | |
| Elton | Guy | |
