= Rob Dickson =

Australian rules footballer (1963–2009)

- Dickson's Australian Survivor portrait, 2001

Personal information
- Full name: Robert Dickson
- Born: 14 November 1963; Box Hill, Victoria, Australia
- Died: 10 April 2009 (aged 45); South Africa

Playing career
Years	Club	Games (Goals)
1988–1990	Hawthorn	17 (12)
1991	Brisbane Bears	2 (0)
Total		19 (12)

Robert Dickson (14 November 1963 – 10 April 2009) was an Australian rules footballer in the VFL/AFL, a film director, and the winner of the first edition of the reality game show Australian Survivor.

== Early life and education ==
Dickson was born on 14 November 1963 in Box Hill to Rick and Effie Dickson and was one of six children. He attended St Pauls College, Traralgon, in Victoria, Australia. Dickson learnt to fly a helicopter whilst employed by the National Safety Council of Australia. He also had a hobby of being an amateur film maker. He took a lot of footage at the Hawthorn Football Club whilst he was on their player list.

== Football career ==
Dickson made his VFL debut with the Hawthorn Football Club in 1988 after being recruited from Morwell, Victoria. He was a fringe player for the Hawks who played in the midfield (at 180 cm and 75 kg), and spent a lot of time in the reserves side. He was selected as an emergency for the 1989 VFL Grand Final. He went on to play 17 games (kicking 12 goals) for Hawthorn in 3 seasons from 1988–1990. He then moved to the Brisbane Bears where he played for one season, in 1991. He played in the 1991 reserves premiership side for Brisbane.

== Media career ==
Following his football career, Dickson became a film director, directing the television documentaries The Passion to Play, Shane Crawford Exposed and The Essence of The Game, which was commissioned by the AFL to celebrate the 150th anniversary of the birth of Australian rules in 2009.

== Australian Survivor ==
Dickson was one of the 16 castaways on the first edition of Australian Survivor, which aired on the Nine Network in 2002. He was a member of the Tipara tribe which won all but one tribal immunity challenge, meaning the tribes merged with Tipara having a 7–3 advantage. The Tipara Seven stuck together to vote out the remaining three members of the rival Kadina tribe before having to turn on their own.

At the final 6, Dickson formed a new alliance with Sciona Browne and Joel Betts, making a final 3 deal to reach the end of the game. They succeeded, despite Betts facing a tied vote (which he survived due to having less previous votes than another contestant). Dickson secured his place in the Final Two by winning the final immunity challenge and voted out Betts, who had agreed to throw the final challenge so that the pair of allies could make it to the Final Two. Dickson and Browne faced the Final Tribal Council, where he won the A$500,000 grand prize in a 5-2 jury vote.

Dickson said at the time that he would use the funds to help his South African mother-in-law emigrate to Australia.

In 2020, he was inducted into the inaugural Australian Survivor Hall of Fame.

== Death ==
Dickson and his 5-year-old son Byron died in a car accident whilst on holiday in South Africa on 10 April 2009. Reports at the time said he failed to give way when he performed a u-turn. His oldest son Gabriel, 8, died on 15 April 2009 in the Unitas Hospital due to injuries sustained in the crash. His wife, Dusty, survived. Dickson was the first winner of any version of Survivor to die.

Preceded by Incumbent	Winner of Australian Survivor; Australian Survivor 1	Succeeded by Guy Leech
