= Guy Leech =

Australian triathlete

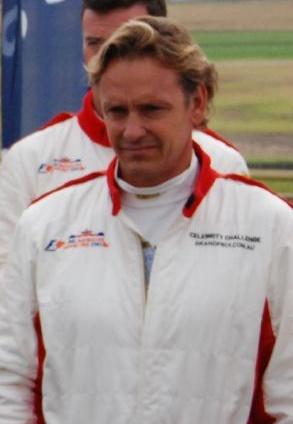
- Guy Leech at the time 2008 Australian Grand Prix Celebrity Challenge
- Born: 29 February 1964 (age 62)
- Occupation: Former Iron Man athlete

Guy Leech (born 29 February 1964) is a former Australian Ironman surf lifesaving champion.

== Career ==
Leech rose to prominence in 1984 at age 19 when he won the inaugural Coolangatta Gold, an endurance Ironman surf lifesaving race inspired by the Australian film of the same name. The race, spanning 46 kilometres along the Gold Coast, involved swimming, surf ski paddling, board paddling, and running. Despite being relatively new to surf lifesaving, Leech's victory established him as a leading endurance athlete in the sport.

He defended his title in 1985, defeating Grant Kenny, and further solidified his status by winning the inaugural Kellogg's Nutri-Grain Ironman event in 1986, held at Southport Beach, Queensland.

In 1989, the launch of the rival Uncle Tobys Super Series marked a major shift in professional Ironman racing. Leech competed in and won the first race of the new series—reviving the 46-kilometre Coolangatta Gold distance—beating a field that included Trevor Hendy and Grant Kenny.

In 1991, Leech won the Molokai to Oahu World Championship of Ocean Paddling in Hawaii, completing the 55-kilometre Ka’iwi Channel crossing against top competitors like Dean Gardiner and Grant Kenny.

In 1993, Leech was declared "Australia’s Fittest Athlete" after winning a made-for-television multi-sport event hosted by 60 Minutes, which tested elite athletes across ten disciplines of speed, strength, power, and endurance.

Leech still trains daily and delivers training sessions with paddling and cross-training strength exercises.

== Philanthropy and Advocacy ==
In 2006, Leech appeared on the Seven Network's Australian Celebrity Survivor: Vanuatu, the second edition of Australian Survivor. He and 11 other celebrities were vying for a cash prize of A$100,000 to be donated to their nominated charity. Leech was initially voted out sixth (i.e. seventh place in the game) and his charity, Ride Aid Inc; however, he returned to the game along with Justin Melvey due to a twist to the show which took Leech to the finals. Ultimately Leech won, taking home an extra A$95000 for his charity. The money was used to build two schools in North Cambodia. In 2020 he was inducted into the inaugural Australian Survivor Hall of Fame.

In 2016, following the sudden cardiac death of his close friend Charles Stewart during a training session, Leech founded Heart180, a national initiative to improve access to defibrillators across Australia. The organisation's goal is to ensure that no Australian is more than 180 seconds from a defibrillator in the event of a cardiac emergency. Since its inception, Heart180 has been credited with saving more than 100 lives.

== Recent Projects ==
In 2025, Leech launched Younger Longer, a longevity-focused health and technology platform designed to help Australians take control of their well-being and extend their quality of life. Drawing from current science on movement, nutrition, and ageing, the platform offers evidence-based programs on balance, mobility, strength, fall prevention, mental health, and healthy lifestyle habits.

== Personal life ==
Leech lives on Sydney's Northern Beaches with his wife, Helen, and their two daughters, Paloma and Phoenix. As a young man, he worked at the Warringah Sports and Aquatic Centre and trained at the Manly Surf Club.

Preceded by Rob Dickson	Winner of Australian Survivor; Celebrity Survivor: Vanuatu	Succeeded by Kristie Bennett
