= Australian Survivor season 4 =

Australian Survivor
- Season 4
- Presented by: Jonathan LaPaglia
- No. of days: 55
- No. of castaways: 24
- Location: Upolu, Samoa
- No. of episodes: 26

Release
- Original network: Network Ten
- Original release: 30 July – 10 October 2017

Additional information
- Filming dates: 4 May – 30 June 2017

Season chronology
- ← Previous; Season 3 (2016) Next → Champions V Contenders

The fourth season of Australian Survivor is a television series based on the international reality competition franchise Survivor. It is the second season to air on the Network Ten, following the network acquiring the broadcast rights to the Australian Survivor franchise in late 2015. Jonathan LaPaglia returned to host the series for his second season.

The season premiered on 30 July 2017. Like the previous season, the program was filmed on the Samoan island of Upolu and featured 24 Australian castaways competing for 55 days in the Samoan jungle for a grand prize of A$500,000. On 10 October 2017, Jericho Malabonga was revealed to be the winner over Tara Pitt by a vote of 6–3.

== Production ==
=== Casting ===
The series was renewed on 23 October 2016. Upon the announcement of renewal, a casting call was made for potential contestants for the new season. Over 20,000 people applied for the new season.

=== Twists ===
This season featured multiple game-play twists for the first time in the series. This season introduced the super-idol which had the power to nullify the use of any other idol at one tribal council (not to be confused with the post-vote negating idol seen first in the American format's Panama season). This season also introduced several 'moral dilemmas' into the game which forced contestants to choose between two luxuries; one that benefits the entire tribe and one that only benefits the finder.

This season also saw the return of non-elimination episodes from season 3, the first of which saw a double tribal council where two contestants were sequentially voted out and sent to the opposing tribe. The following day, two contestants of the other tribe were then required to volunteer to switch to the tribe to replace them. The second non-elimination episode saw the contestants of one tribe vote for one of their members to receive a reward. The third featured a Tribal Council mutiny and the fourth featured a juror elimination.

This season also introduced a variety of twists previously seen on the American format including the initial marooning, the hiding of an immunity idol at challenges (first seen in Cambodia), tribal mutiny (first seen in Thailand) and jury member elimination (as seen in Kaôh Rōng).

== Contestants ==
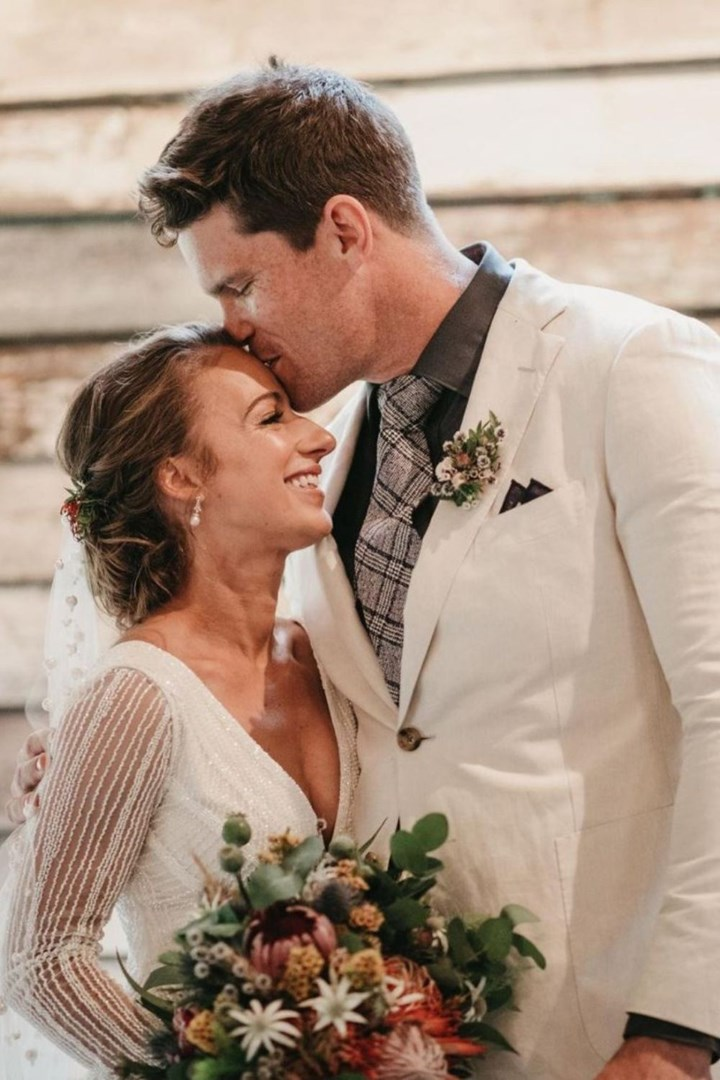
Samantha Gash and Mark Wales

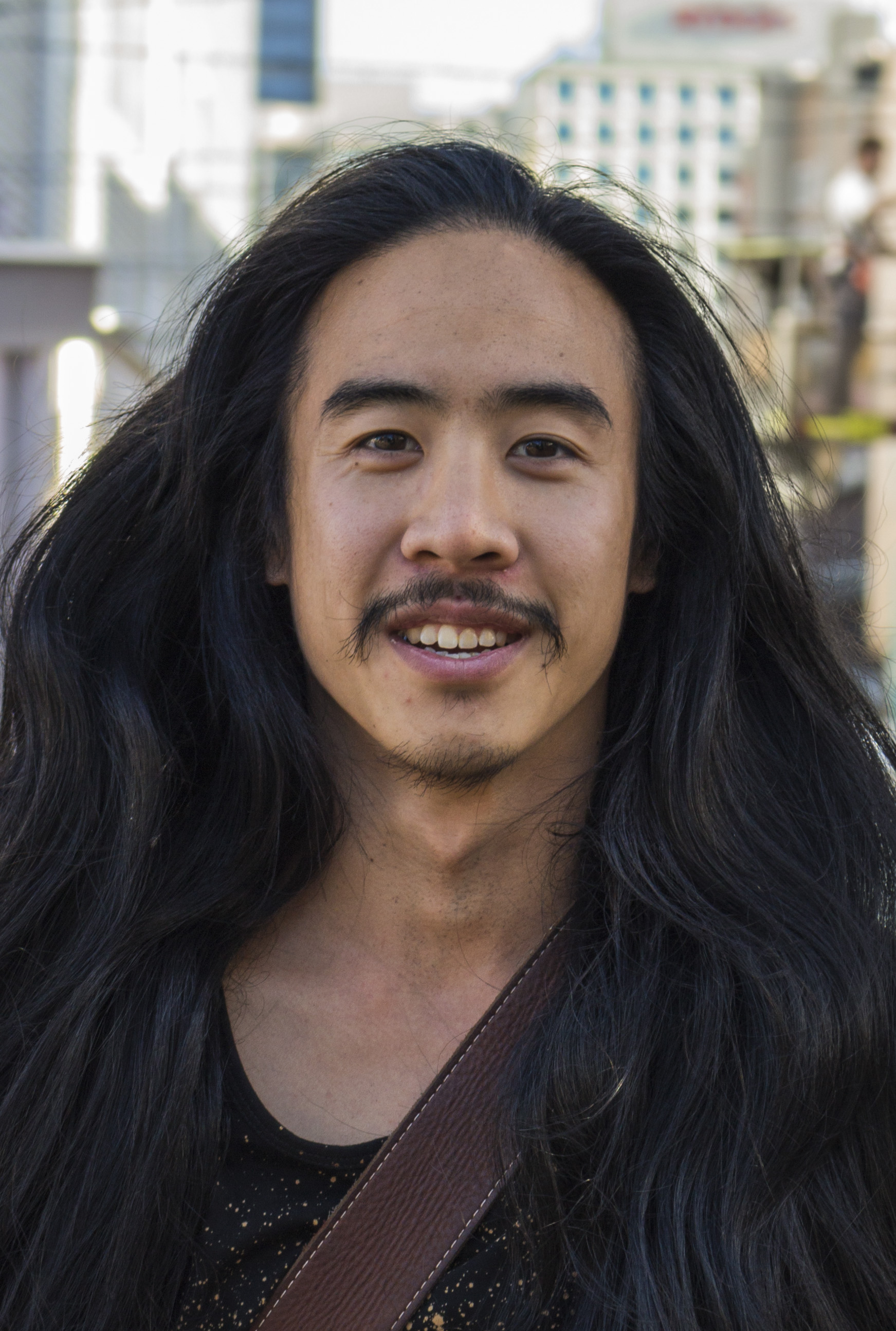
Jarrad Seng

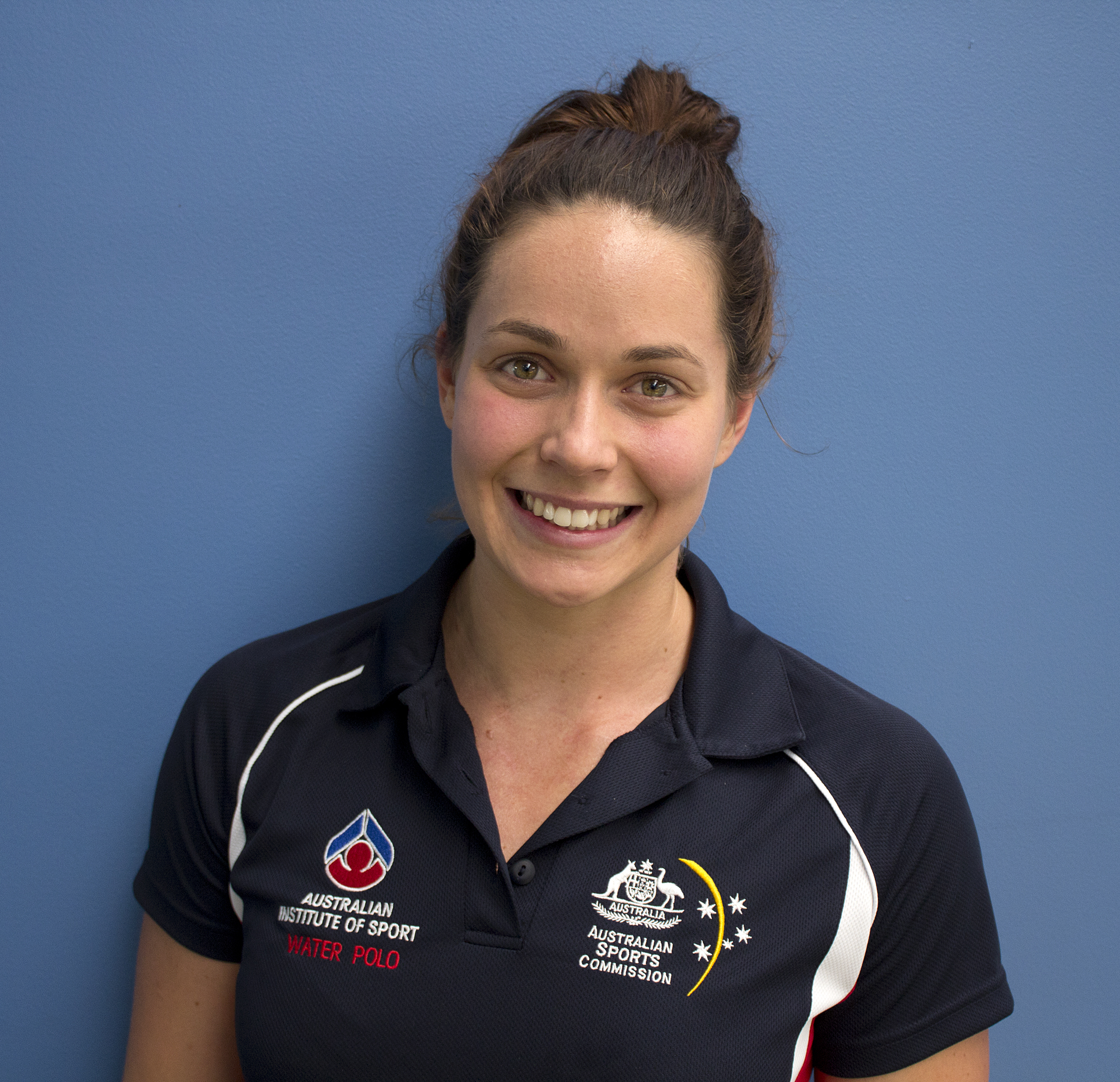
Nicola "Ziggy" Zagame

List of Australian Survivor season 4 contestants
Contestant	Original tribe	First swapped tribe	Second swapped tribe	Post-mutiny tribe	Merged tribe	Finish
Joan Caballero; 29, Sydney, NSW	Asaga					1st voted out Day 3
Adam Parkin; 40, Brisbane, QLD	Samatau					2nd voted out Day 6
Kate Temby; 47, Melbourne, VIC	Samatau					3rd voted out Day 9
Mark "Tarzan" Herlaar; 51, Toowoomba, QLD	Samatau					4th voted out Day 11
Aimee Stanton; 23, Melbourne, VIC	Samatau					5th voted out Day 13
Samantha "Sam" Gash; 32, Melbourne, VIC	Asaga					6th voted out Day 16
Mark Wales; 37, Perth, WA	Asaga					7th voted out Day 18
Jacqui Patterson; 50, Byron Bay, NSW	Asaga	Asaga				8th voted out Day 22
Kent Nelson; 51, Adelaide, SA	Asaga	Asaga				9th voted out Day 24
Aaron "A.K." Knight; 29, Adelaide, SA	Samatau	Samatau	Asaga			10th voted out Day 28
Ben Morgan; 20, Perth, WA	Asaga	Samatau	Samatau			11th voted out Day 30
Odette Blacklock; 32, Sydney, NSW	Asaga	Asaga	Asaga	Asaga		12th voted out Day 34
Jarrad Seng; 29, Mount Lawley, WA	Samatau	Samatau	Samatau	Samatau	Asatoa	13th voted out 1st jury member Day 36
Anneliese Wilson; 23, Melbourne, VIC	Samatau	Asaga	Samatau	Samatau	Asatoa	14th voted out 2nd jury member Day 38
Henry Nicholson; 26, Adelaide, SA	Asaga	Samatau	Samatau	Samatau	Asatoa	15th voted out 3rd jury member Day 40
Tessa O’Halloran; 29, Melbourne, VIC	Samatau	Samatau	Samatau	Samatau	Asatoa	16th voted out ~~4th jury member~~ (Note: On Day 50, for winning a special reward challenge, Jericho earned the power to eliminate one of the first 8 jury members. He chose Tessa.); Day 42
Sarah Tilleke; 22, Perth, WA	Asaga	Asaga	Asaga	Asaga	Asatoa	17th voted out 5th jury member Day 44
Luke Toki; 30, Perth, WA	Asaga	Asaga	Asaga	Asaga	Asatoa	18th voted out 6th jury member Day 46
Nicola "Ziggy" Zagame; 26, Gymea Bay, NSW	Samatau	Samatau	Samatau	Samatau	Asatoa	19th voted out 7th jury member Day 47
Locky Gilbert; 27, Perth, WA	Samatau	Samatau	Samatau	Samatau	Asatoa	20th voted out 8th jury member Day 49
Michelle Dougan; 33, Sydney, NSW	Asaga	Asaga	Samatau	Samatau	Asatoa	21st voted out 9th jury member Day 52
Peter Conte; 22, Sydney, NSW	Samatau	Samatau	Asaga	Samatau	Asatoa	22nd voted out 10th jury member Day 54
Tara Pitt; 32, Sunshine Coast, QLD	Samatau	Asaga	Asaga	Asaga	Asatoa	Runner-up; Day 55
Jericho Malabonga; 25, Melbourne, VIC	Asaga	Asaga	Asaga	Asaga	Asatoa	Sole Survivor; Day 55

=== Future appearances ===
Luke Toki competed on the 2019 edition of Australian Survivor: Champions vs. Contenders as part of the Champions tribe. Mark Herlaar, Jacqui Patterson, Aaron "A.K." Knight, Henry Nicholson, Locky Gilbert, Michelle Dougan and Jericho Malabonga competed on Australian Survivor: All Stars. Samantha Gash and Mark Wales - who were married at the time - competed on Australian Survivor: Blood V Water as a pair. Toki and Sarah Tilleke returned for Australian Survivor: Australia V The World.

Outside of Survivor, Locky appeared on the eighth season of The Bachelor Australia as the titular bachelor in 2020. Aimee competed on the eighth season of Seven Network's House Rules in 2020 and finished as the runner up. Sam and Mark competed on the Amazon Prime Video series World's Toughest Race: Eco-Challenge Fiji as part of Team Aussie Rescue and finished the race in 26th place after 212 hours and 28 minutes. Michelle competed in the tenth episode of The Cube in 2021 with her sister Sam. Luke competed on Big Brother VIP, finishing in first place. Sam and Mark appeared on The Dog House Australia in 2022. In 2023, Luke competed on the second season of The Traitors, while in 2026 Henry competed on the third season. Joan competed on Season 2 of Squid Game: The Challenge in 2025 as player #69, she was eliminated in the third episode.

== Season summary ==
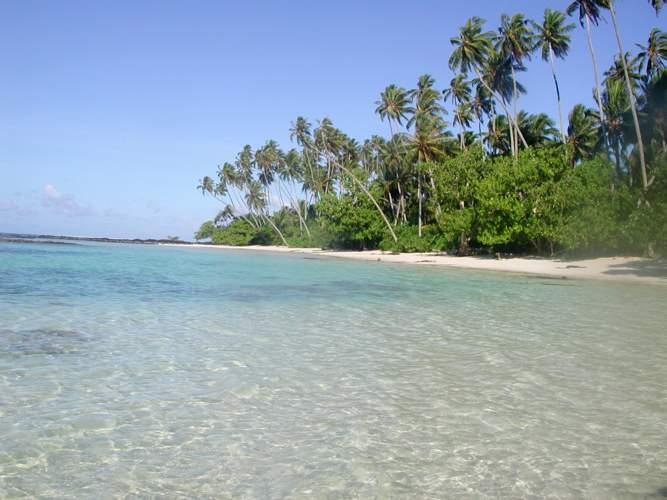
The season filmed in Upolu in Samoa.

The 24 contestants were split into two tribes. On Asaga, Luke and his closest ally Jericho were in the minority and unsuccessfully attempted to upset the balance of power in the tribe. On Samatau, A.K. was on the bottom due to his aggressive strategizing, but he was able to seize control by eliminating Aimee, the closest ally of the tribe's prominent strategist in Locky. Outsiders Tara and Anneliese were sent to Asaga in a fake double elimination, with Ben and Henry taking their place. Luke and Jericho used the opportunity to take control of Asaga, while Samatau went on an immunity run. A second tribe swap sent A.K. & Peter to Asaga and Anneliese & Michelle to Samatau; later, a mutiny twist was offered, and Peter was the only one to accept, sending him back to Samatau.

The merge left Samatau in a 6–5 majority, but the Asaga members convinced the people on the bottom of Samatau to turn against Jarrad and Anneliese, eliminating them both. A new majority composed of Tessa, Michelle, Luke, Peter, Sarah, and Jericho blindsided Henry before Luke caught wind of a plan against Jericho, prompting him to make a move against Tessa. Tara then decided to betray her closest ally Locky due to his status as a threat, but he went on an immunity run that eventually ended with his elimination.

At the Final 4, Jericho won an advantage to remove a member of the jury. He chose Tessa, believing her to be the least likely to vote for him to win, despite her saying that she viewed Tara as the weakest player. Peter was the next intended target, but after he won immunity, he lobbied for Jericho's elimination. This was foiled after Jericho uncovered the plan and Tara, paranoid after Tessa's statements, decided to make a big move and force a fire-making challenge between Jericho and Michelle. Jericho ended up winning, and thus Michelle was eliminated. Jericho then won the final immunity challenge and decided to stay true to his new alliance with Tara, voting out Peter.

At the Final Tribal Council, Tara was commended for her strong social game, playing from a minority position and her orchestration of Locky and A.K's elimination, but chastised for riding Locky's coattails for far too long, not making enough strategic decisions, and being weak in challenges. Meanwhile, Jericho was congratulated for his very effective method of making alliances and using shields, playing under-the-radar, and winning challenges when he needed to. However he was criticized for his cruelty and hypocrisy, claiming to be a benevolent religious person despite unnecessarily being nasty to Jarrad and Sarah when they were eliminated, riding on Luke's coattails, and making bad decisions such as removing Tessa from the jury and taking Tara to the end, despite Tessa saying she would be very unlikely to vote for Tara to win. However, Jericho's strong strategic and physical game was rewarded over Tara's underdog status, and he was awarded the title of Sole Survivor with six jury votes to Tara's three.

Challenge winners and eliminations by episode

Tribal phase (Day 1–34)
Episode		Challenge winner(s)		Eliminated	Finish
No.	Air date	Reward	Immunity	Eliminated	Finish
1	30 July 2017	Samatau	Samatau	Joan	1st voted out Day 3
1	30 July 2017	Asaga (Note: This challenge was a two-on-two challenge, with Jacqui and Mark W. chosen to represent Asaga, and Adam & Mark H. chosen to represent Samatau. Jacqui and Mark W. won the challenge, earning reward for their entire tribe.)	Samatau	Joan	1st voted out Day 3
2	31 July 2017	Samatau	Asaga	Adam	2nd voted out Day 6
3	1 August 2017	Samatau	Asaga	Kate	3rd voted out Day 9
4	6 August 2017	Samatau	Asaga	Tarzan	4th voted out Day 11
5	7 August 2017	None	Asaga	Aimee	5th voted out Day 13
6	13 August 2017	Samatau	Samatau	Sam	6th voted out Day 16
7	14 August 2017	None	Samatau	Mark	7th voted out Day 18
8	20 August 2017	Asaga	Asaga	No elimination on Day 20 due to a fake double tribal council. (Note: Instead of voting out players, Samatau unknowingly voted for two tribe members to be swapped to Asaga. Tara and Anneliese were voted out and we’re exiled for the night before joining Asaga on Day 21.)	
9	21 August 2017	None (Note: No reward challenge was held due to the second part of the tribal swap. Following Tara and Anneliese's swap to Asaga, Asaga was tasked with choosing two of their own tribe members to take Tara and Anneliese's spot on Samatau. They chose Ben and Henry.)	Samatau	Jacqui	8th voted out Day 22
10	27 August 2017	Asaga	Samatau	Kent	9th voted out Day 24
11	28 August 2017	Samatau (Note: For winning the reward challenge, Samatau went to a special Tribal Council to vote for a player for a chance to win the "ultimate reward"; they chose Ziggy. Ziggy earned a chance to search for a "super idol," which she found.)	No immunity challenge or elimination on Day 26 due to the "ultimate reward" vote & challenge.		
11	28 August 2017	Ziggy	No immunity challenge or elimination on Day 26 due to the "ultimate reward" vote & challenge.		
12	3 September 2017	Asaga	Samatau	A.K.	10th voted out Day 28
13	4 September 2017	None	Asaga	Ben	11th voted out Day 30
14	10 September 2017	Samatau	Samatau	No elimination on Day 32 due to the mutiny offer. (Note: Instead of voting out a member of the tribe, Asaga were offered a chance to mutiny and join Samatau. Only one castaway could mutiny. Peter chose to mutiny.)	
14	10 September 2017	[Peter, Sarah] (Note: Samatau were told to invite two castaways from Asaga on their reward, they chose Peter and Sarah.)	Samatau	No elimination on Day 32 due to the mutiny offer.	
15	11 September 2017	None	Samatau	Odette	12th voted out Day 34

Individual phase (Day 35–55)
Episode		Challenge winner(s)		Eliminated	Finish
No.	Air date	Reward	Immunity	Eliminated	Finish
16	17 September 2017	Tessa (Note: After winning, Jonathan offered Tessa to give up her meal in exchange for everyone getting letters from home. She accepted the offer.)	Ziggy	Jarrad	13th voted out 1st jury member Day 36
17	18 September 2017	None	Henry	Anneliese	14th voted out 2nd jury member Day 38
18	19 September 2017	Survivor; Auction	Tessa	Henry	15th voted out 3rd jury member Day 40
19	24 September 2017	None	Ziggy	Tessa	16th voted out ~~4th jury member~~ (Note: On Day 50, for winning a special reward challenge, Jericho earned the power to eliminate one of the first 8 jury members. He chose Tessa.); Day 42
20	25 September 2017	Locky, Luke, Sarah, Ziggy	Locky	Sarah	17th voted out 5th jury member Day 44
21	26 September 2017	None	Locky	Luke	18th voted out 6th jury member Day 46
22	2 October 2017	None	Locky	Ziggy	19th voted out 7th jury member Day 47
23	3 October 2017	Michelle (Note: The winner of the challenge also received reward.) [Jericho, Tara]		Locky	20th voted out 8th jury member Day 49
24	8 October 2017	Jericho	No immunity challenge or elimination on Day 50 due to the Jury Elimination.		
25	9 October 2017	None	Peter	Michelle	21st voted out 9th jury member Day 52
26	10 October 2017	None	Jericho	Peter	22nd voted out 10th jury member Day 54
26	10 October 2017			Final Vote	
26	10 October 2017			Tara	Runner-Up; Day 55
26	10 October 2017			Jericho	Sole Survivor; Day 55

In the case of multiple tribes or castaways who win reward or immunity, they are listed in order of finish, or alphabetically where it was a team effort; where one castaway won and invited others, the invitees are in brackets.

=== Episodes ===
No. overall	No. in season	Title	Timeline	Original release date
52	1	"Welcome to Survivor"	Days 1-3	30 July 2017
The 24 contestants board a barge in the middle of the night in the pouring rain to begin the adventure of a lifetime. The next morning, they are divided into two tribes of 12, Asaga and Samatau. The game begins with the first reward challenge: Reward challenge: The tribes race to grab supplies from a boat and push their supply net into the water. Then put their supplies on the net, jump into the water and push the net to the beach. On the beach is a large bag of rice on a hook. The first tribe to get their supply net onto the beach and grab the rice keeps all of their collected supplies and the rice. The losing tribe gets nothing.; Samatau won the challenge. On Samatau's first night, Locky takes a leadership role on the tribe. AK begins to play an aggressive, strategic game right off the bat talking to everyone on the tribe and setting up numerous alliances. However, AK ends up offending Tara when he talks strategy with her in the middle of the night while she's vomiting and Tara believes that AK is a threat that needs to be voted out first. At Asaga, Mark is reluctant to take on a leadership role, despite having a lot of survival experience, because he doesn't want to be seen as a threat. Kent is also concerned about his position in the game because he's the oldest and knows that older players don't always last on Survivor.: Reward challenge: Each tribe selects two members to compete in a fire-making challenge. The first tribe to build a fire which burns through a rope wins a lit torch and flint.; The next day, the tribes receive tree mail for a second reward challenge where the winning tribe will win flint to make fire. Mark and Jacqui compete for Asaga and Tarzan and Adam compete for Samatau which Mark and Jacqui secure the win for Asaga.: Immunity challenge: Ten members from each tribe compete in an obstacle course. They scramble under a low obstacle, then two tribe members climb a rope to release a cargo net, allowing the rest of the tribe to climb a tower. The tribes then move six crates to build a staircase for another tower. They slide down a ramp and then build a human pyramid to reach a rope, releasing two bags of puzzle pieces. The remaining two tribe members use the pieces to solve a puzzle.; Samatau won the challenge. Back at Asaga, Joan and Kent are concerned that one of them will be voted out because they were the puzzle makers during the Immunity Challenge and ended up losing. The rest of Asaga discuss voting out either Joan or Kent, citing both of them as players that might struggle with future challenges. Samantha takes control of the vote and starts telling everyone to split the votes between Joan and Kent to prevent an idol being played. Samantha considers Kent a friend and hopes to keep him over Joan. However, Luke doesn't like Samantha taking control of the tribe and attempts to convince some of the tribe to vote out Kent in order to prevent Samantha from getting power in the game. At Tribal Council, both Kent and Joan plead for their tribe to give them another chance. When the votes are read, it is a 6-6 tie with Henry, Jacqui, Kent, Mark, Samantha, and Sarah voting for Joan and Ben, Joan, Jericho, Luke, Michelle, and Odette voting for Kent. Because it is a tie, the tribe, minus Joan and Kent, is told to vote again. On the revote, Ben and Jericho switch their votes to Joan. Joan becomes the first person voted off of Australian Survivor.
53	2	"The Chicken Idol"	Days 4-6	31 July 2017
After Asaga's first Tribal Council, Samantha is upset that her plan was not followed and wants to find out who cast the rogue votes. While Luke was not able to get Kent voted out, he is still thrilled that he forced a tie and made Samantha paranoid. Luke states that his goal is to constantly ruffle feathers and keep people on their toes and he hopes to use this against Samantha to get her voted out next. On Asaga, there appears to be a tight alliance between Henry, Jacqui, Mark, Sarah, and Samantha while another alliance forms between Ben, Luke, Michelle, and Odette. On Samatau, AK has found himself on the bottom of the tribe after everyone discovered how much he was strategizing. AK tries to pretend he has an idol. AK grabs a stone that is shaped like a chicken and tells Jarrad that he found the idol on the barge at the start of the game in the chicken coop and that he must play it at the first Tribal Council. Word spreads around camp and people wonder if AK is telling the truth. Meanwhile, Adam establishes an alliance with Kate, Tara, Tarzan, Tessa, and Ziggy, intending on taking out AK at Samatau's first Tribal Council.: Reward challenge: One member from each tribe will go down a slippery course, and compete for a ball. First person to get the ball into their goal square, scores a point. First tribe to seven points wins. The winning tribe wins fishing gear and an outrigger canoe.; Samatau won. During the Reward Challenge, AK tells Henry that he is on the bottom of Samatau and will flip if he makes it to a tribe swap or merge. Back at camp, both Adam and AK spot a Hidden Immunity Idol clue in the fishing gear the tribe won, but Adam is able to grab the clue first. While the tribe is building their shelter, Adam goes off to search for the idol to keep it away from AK, but AK follows him. Determined to keep the idol from AK, Adam returns to the beach and tries to get Kate, Tara, Tessa, and Ziggy to help him search. The others tell Adam that they want to finish the shelter first. Adam gets confrontational, telling the women that if they want to be in this alliance they need to help him get the idol. Adam's tone upsets Tara, who believes Adam is being selfish and only looking out for himself. Eventually, everyone in camp learns about the clue and head out to find the idol. While searching, Locky finds an area that's been dug up and a string on the ground. Adam reveals he dug around that area, but states that he didn't find the idol. Locky has a hard time believing Adam's story and believes Adam found the idol. Adam gets upset and dares the tribe to vote him off the island if they think he has the idol. Everyone is stunned by Adam's behavior and many believe he has found the idol. Adam realizes the terrible position he has put himself in because people believe he has the idol. Over at Asaga, Luke starts to work on a spy shack so he can spy on people in the woods. Later, Henry and Jacqui go to the water well and discover a Hidden Immunity Idol clue hidden beneath the well lid. The two go off to search and Henry finds the idol. Henry believes that he and Jacqui have become a power couple in the game and he hopes to make some big moves.: Immunity challenge: Nine runners from each tribe will run through a mud pit, break a bamboo tunnel, and finally a brick wall. After busting through the brick wall, one person, who can be swapped out, will have to hammer a set of pegs, which will allow them to open a drawer containing club hammers. The remaining two tribe members will use the war clubs to break six tiles. First tribe to break all of their tiles wins.; Asaga won immunity. At camp, the tribe is considering voting out either Adam, AK, or Anneliese. Anneliese did not do well in the challenge and worries the tribe considers her weak. Meanwhile, AK hopes to paint the target on Adam to save himself. AK tells Anneliese that Adam approached him to see if he would vote Anneliese out of the game. Anneliese believes AK is telling the truth and approaches her alliance of Aimee, Jarrad, Locky, and Peter and persuades them to split the vote between Adam and Kate instead of voting out AK. As a backup plan, AK also shows his fake chicken idol to everyone to convince them he does have an idol. However, nobody believes the idol is real and everyone considers sticking with the original plan to vote out AK because he continues to prove himself untrustworthy. Adam believes that he will have the numbers to vote out Anneliese tonight as long as nobody flips, but is concerned that Tara might not trust him anymore after his handling of the idol situation. Adam does apologize to Tara about the way he acted. Tara recognizes that she is a swing vote tonight as she can either stay loyal to Adam or join the other side and get rid of him. Before Tribal Council, AK attempts to talk to Jarrad once more about the vote, but Jarrad tells AK he doesn't know if he can trust him and believes that AK ruined that when he told the lie about the chicken idol. AK believes that he and Jarrad can go far in the game, but knows that he's put himself in a bad position with all of his strategic game play. At Tribal Council, both Adam and AK are called out by the tribe for being the two most aggressive players on the tribe. Both Adam and AK make pleas to their tribe. AK admits that he made a mistake in believing that everyone else would be playing the game as hard as him from the start and he should have realized that and calmed down. Adam states that he has been honest with everyone except AK, with Tarzan coming to Adam's defense noting that Adam shared the idol clue with everyone when he could have kept it for himself. Adam swears he did not find the idol and reminds everyone that the person causing the chaos and disharmony in the tribe is AK. Before the votes are read, AK stands up and reveals that he did indeed find the real idol and plays it on Jarrad. When the votes are read, Tara is revealed to have joined the other alliance's plan in splitting the votes between Adam and Kate. Kate voted for AK; Adam, Tarzan, Tessa, and Ziggy voted for Anneliese; Anneliese and Tara voted for Kate; and Aimee, AK, Jarrad, Locky, and Peter voted for Adam. With five votes, Adam becomes the second person voted out of Australian Survivor.
54	3	"The Other Nail in Her Coffin"	Days 6-9	1 August 2017
At Samatau, AK is thrilled to still be in the game. AK has begun to build trust with Jarrad again after playing the idol for him at Tribal and AK is determined to step back from the strategy and work on his social game. It is revealed that a new alliance of eight, dubbed the Misfits Alliance, has been created on the tribe, leaving Kate, Tarzan, and Tessa on the bottom of the tribe. Tessa is extremely angry at Tara for flipping on Adam's alliance. On Asaga, there are several power couples beginning to form. Luke and Jericho have formed a friendship, Henry and Jacqui are a strong alliance, and Samantha and Mark have formed a strong alliance. However, the rest of the tribe is concerned about Samantha and Mark as the two of them have been cuddling at night and people see them as a powerful force in the game. Henry and Jacqui consider blindsiding Samantha at the next Tribal Council to split her and Mark up.: Reward challenge: Both tribes will have nine members maneuver a large boulder through a series of gates and then on top of a bridge. Afterwards, two tribe members will then get on top of the boulder to get from one high platform to another. On the second platform, they will then throw rings onto pegs in order to release a ramp. The first tribe to get their boulder up the ramp and into the holes wins. The winning tribe won comfort items including: chairs, a hammock, sheets, lanterns, candles, and a tarp.; Samatau won reward. At the end of the challenge, Ziggy ends up falling in the hole but is not injured. Locky blames Tarzan for pushing Ziggy into the hole because he was pushing on the ball. Tarzan does not appreciate Locky throwing blame at him when they won the challenge. The two continue to butt heads back at camp when they argue over how to put the tarp on the shelter. The tribe recognizes that Locky and Tarzan both have alpha male personalities and might not be able to work together much longer. Kate, Tarzan, and Tessa believe Locky is the leader of the Misfits Alliance and they think he is getting too confident with his position. At Asaga, Samantha learns from Sarah that people have been talking about voting Samantha out. Samantha is extremely upset that she's been targeted so early in the game. Suspicious that Henry and Jacqui are conspiring against her, Samantha asks Mark to follow the two as they walk to the watering well to make sure they're not talking about her. Mark does follow Henry and Jacqui into the woods. When they return, Kent informs Jacqui that Samantha told Mark to follow them. Once Henry is told, he is more determined than ever to get Samantha out of the game and even considers throwing the next Immunity Challenge just to vote her out.: Immunity challenge: Both tribes will paddle a raft out past a series of crates to a moor. They will have one member swim out and dive down and untie a series of knots to get a key. They will then need to paddle back to shore and use the key to unlock a chest containing bamboo. Using the bamboo, they will then construct a tower around a pole. The tribe that builds a tower higher than their pole and can stay up for five seconds wins.; During the Immunity Challenge, it appears Henry did try to sabotage his team by paddling very poorly on the raft and leaving the key to unlock the bamboo on the raft after the team runs up the beach. However, Asaga came back from behind to win Immunity. Back at Samatau, the Misfits Alliance decides to split the votes between Kate and Tessa. Locky wants Tessa to leave because he thinks Kate will perform better in challenges and that Tessa will flip on Samatau if she makes the merge. Kate and Tessa attempt to persuade AK and Jarrad to flip on the Misfits Alliance and vote out Tara, as they are upset that Tara flipped and call Tara an emotional player with no loyalties. AK considers the plan, noting that he doesn't trust Tara and he knows that Tara wants to vote him out of the game. At Tribal Council, Tara and Tessa argue back and forth about Tara's perceived flipping on Adam's alliance. Tara does not believe that she actually flipped given Adam's behavior and states that she merely stepped out of the alliance. Tessa accuses Tara of flipping and tries to convince the tribe that Tara will continue to flip in order to save herself in the future. When the votes are read, Kate and Tessa voted for Tara. However, the Misfits stick together and split their votes between Kate and Tessa. Interestingly, it is Tarzan who is the swing vote. Instead of voting for Tara, he casts his vote for Kate in order to keep Tessa in the game as he has formed a strong bond with her. Kate becomes the third person voted out of Australian Survivor.
55	4	"Cookie Monster"	Days 9-11	6 August 2017
After Tribal, Tessa is surprised to still be in the game and is grateful that Tarzan saved her. Tarzan sees Tessa like a daughter figure in the game and states he will do whatever he can to protect her. Tara is upset that Tessa called her out at Tribal and is concerned that people will perceive her as a flipper. Tessa knows she needs a miracle in the game if she wants to survive the next Tribal Council. Tarzan and Tessa attempt to convince Locky to think about the strength of the tribe and vote out Anneliese next, but Locky states that voting out Anneliese would kill his strategy. Tessa knows she needs the Hidden Immunity Idol to survive the next Tribal.: Reward challenge: Jonathan will release hundreds of coconuts into the sea. The tribe will then use rafts to collect the coconuts. As they bring the raft ashore, two castaways will be surfed in, one at a time, on top of the coconut raft on a surfboard. They will then bring their coconuts to a crate, and then use a mini-trampoline to bounce the coconuts in order to smash three tiki statues. First tribe to smash the entire statue wins. The winning tribe received coffee, tea, spices, and herbs. (Samatau Wins); Samatau won the challenge. At both camps, Tarzan from Samatau and Jericho from Asaga separately came upon a pile of firewood and a large jar of cookies. Both are told they can take the firewood for their tribe or they can take the jar of cookies for themselves. Tarzan doesn't want to be dishonest and selfish, so he decides to take the firewood. While Jericho states he's a Christian in his real life, he came into the game determined to do whatever it took to win. Jericho decides to take the cookies. Jericho decides to use the jar of cookies to his advantage in order to build trust in the game. Jericho tells Luke about the jar of cookies as the two have become close. Jericho also wants to build an alliance with Henry as he sees Henry as a strong player. However, Jericho only tells Henry a half truth. Jericho tells Henry that the dilemma only contained a handful of cookies instead of a whole jar. Jericho shares a few cookies with Henry and, later, Luke and Jericho eat some more cookies out of the jar. Jericho is hoping that his generosity has earned him long term trust in the game.: Immunity challenge: The tribe will be divided into two groups: builders and runners. Builders will build the obstacle course as they go. First the builders will need to pull a cargo net for the runners to get across and then they will use stepping poles. While the builders use ladders to bridge the third and final platform, runners will need to carry sandbags across. On the final platform, using the sandbags the runners will need to throw them to knock off a block on a rail. The first tribe to knock their block off wins. If at any point anyone falls off the obstacle, they will need to start over.; Asaga won Immunity. Back at camp, the Misfits decide that Tessa is going home next and nobody believes she has an idol. Tessa and Tarzan both go to look for the idol and Tarzan finds the idol. Tarzan decides to make a big move with the idol and hopes to blindside Locky. Tarzan tells Locky that he will join the majority to vote out Tessa tonight, which makes Locky suspicious as Tarzan normally doesn't just go along with plans without having a discussion. Tarzan pulls Tessa and AK aside and reveals he found the idol. Tarzan gives the idol to Tessa to use tonight. Tarzan and Tessa attempt to convince AK that he is on the bottom of the Misfits and flipping would be to his benefit. Tarzan states that he told AK about the idol in order to build trust with him. AK again considers whether he should join this plan because he does feel like he is on the bottom of the Misfits and he does want to see Locky leave. At Tribal, Tessa encourages everyone in the Misfits to think about their position in the game because someone is on the bottom. AK does acknowledge that he is on the bottom, but he is trying to prove to everyone that he has learned from his past mistakes and can be trusted. Nobody else is willing to admit they feel on the bottom and everyone else states that they are just riding the middle and riding the numbers. After the votes are cast, Tessa does play the idol on herself. This negates six votes that were cast against her. However, it is clear that AK did tell his alliance about Tarzan's idol as the votes are split. Tarzan receives three votes from Jarrad, Locky, and Peter which are enough to make him the fourth person voted out of Australian Survivor.
56	5	"Line in the Sand"	Days 12-13	7 August 2017
After Tribal Council, AK reveals that he's completely aware he's on the bottom of the Misfits Alliance, he's been laying low to take the heat off of him, but AK is now ready to make a move. AK approaches Tessa and tells her that he wants to flip the game. Tessa is pleased to hear this and agrees to work with AK moving forward. Tessa is happy to finally have new life in the game. On Asaga, Jericho continues to use his jar of cookies to build trust. Jericho tells Sarah about the jar of cookies and shares some of them with her. Sarah is very appreciative that Jericho would share this with her. Later that night, Luke and Jericho finish the rest of the cookies.: Immunity challenge: Both tribes will form a human chain. Between each person has a disc with a small torch they must hold up with the people next to them. If anyone drops a disc, they'll break the chain. The last tribe standing with at least any two people holding onto a single disc wins.; The Immunity Challenge is a close match and it comes down to one pair from each tribe: Ziggy and AK versus Henry and Mark. In the end, Asaga holds on longer to win Immunity for the fourth time in a row. Back at camp, the Misfits get together and agree to get rid of Tessa next. However, AK begins to work on a plan to flip the game. AK finds that Locky, Tara, Aimee, and Anneliese are a tight foursome while AK, Jarrad, and Ziggy are a tight threesome. AK believes that the three of them will get picked off if they vote out Tessa tonight. AK wants to unseat Locky as the leader, but he knows that Samatau needs Locky to stay if they want to win challenges. AK approaches Tessa, Jarrad, and Ziggy and the four come up with a plan to vote out Aimee because they believe Aimee is too close to Locky and would never turn on him. In order to get the majority, Jarrad approaches Peter to see if he will join with them. Peter is conflicted as he has a close friendship with Tara, but he believes that Tara might be getting closer to Locky and might just see Peter as more of a number now. Before Tribal Council, Tara discusses a plan with Locky and Aimee to use Tessa while she's still in the game and vote out AK tonight. The three agree that AK is going to be a huge threat once Tessa is gone because he'll probably start scheming again. The three talk with Tessa, Anneliese, and Peter and tell them to vote out AK tonight. Tara believes that if she blindsides AK tonight, it will be her biggest move yet. At Tribal Council, several people tease the idea of the Misfits sticking together versus making a move tonight. Aimee stuns everyone when she states that there was never a strong eight person alliance. Aimee clarifies that people within the Misfits certainly click better and that's an inevitable part of the game. On the outside, it appears the Misfits are sticking together and Tessa again encourages everyone to think about their positions in the game and hopes for the best. When the votes are cast, AK receives four votes from Locky, Aimee, Tara, and Anneliese. However, Peter ends up joining with AK, and AK, Tessa, Jarrad, Peter, and Ziggy blindside Aimee with five votes. Aimee becomes the fifth person voted out of Australian Survivor.
57	6	"Put Both Their Necks on the Block & Start Chopping"	Days 14-16	13 August 2017
After blindsiding Aimee, AK is thrilled that his plan worked, he sees himself as the new leader of Samatau, and he doesn't have to explain himself because Locky and Tara tried to blindside him. A new majority alliance of AK, Jarrad, Peter, Tessa, and Ziggy has formed on Samatau. Peter does admit to the tribe that he cast the deciding vote as he wanted to make his own move in the game and felt that Tara only saw him as a number in the game. Tara is extremely hurt and angry at Peter's betrayal stating that she has protected Peter since the beginning and his betrayal has hurt her. Tara accuses AK of being the new puppet master and everyone else is his puppets. AK believes that Tara has sealed her fate and will be the next one voted out.: Reward challenge: The members of each tribe line up on a very narrow balance beam. One tribe member at a time, they must move across the beam and around the other tribe members. The person crossing can only touch one member at a time. If two people touch at once or a member falls into the water, they must start all over. Once a member reaches the platform, the next person may proceed. The tribe who gets all their members across first wins. The winning tribe is awarded a survivor barbecue consisting of sausages, hamburgers, prawns, and beer.; Samatau won the challenge. Ben struggles during the Reward Challenge and falls off the balance beam multiple times. Samantha believes that Ben is the weakest link on Asaga and needs to be voted out next. While Samatau is enjoying their barbecue and bonding, AK changes the mood when he starts to search for an idol clue. Tara and Anneliese are bothered by AK's actions, believing that AK is only thinking about himself and is causing more division in Samatau than there ever has been. Tara begins to break down and cry over the stress of the game, feeling upset that she has found herself on the bottom and that AK has ruined her game. Locky and Anneliese support Tara and encourage her not to give up. Tara gets some of her strength back and is determined to make the tribe see AK's true deceitful nature. On Asaga, Samantha gets pulled under the tide and Luke and Mark have to save her. Later, Henry reveals in secret that his strategy was to tell people he is a yoga instructor so people believe that he isn't a strategic player when he is actually a laborer. Sarah and Samantha begin to suspect that Henry is not really a yoga instructor based on comments he makes about his yoga background. Henry is still threatened by Samantha and Mark's relationship in the game and is concerned that Samantha is catching onto his lies. Henry notes that Samantha's strategy is to talk to everyone and collect information and she has been playing a strong game. Henry hopes to finally throw the next challenge to get rid of Samantha once and for all.: Immunity challenge: One by one, members from both tribes will go through a series of obstacles in the water: a high dive, a slide, and a next crawl. Once all of the tribe members are on shore, they will use a machete to hack through a pole to release puzzle pieces. Two tribe members will then use the pieces to complete a puzzle. First tribe to complete the puzzle wins.; Henry volunteers for the puzzle portion of the challenge, along with Sarah, and does not perform well, allowing Samatau to put the puzzle together first and win Immunity. Henry confesses in private that he saw an opportunity to throw the challenge and did with the hopes of sending Samantha home. Back at Asaga, there are two plans that appear to be forming. Samantha and Mark believe that their alliance with Henry, Jacqui, and Sarah is tight and that the tribe will be splitting the votes between their two weakest players, Michelle and Ben. However, Henry hopes to blindside Samantha and has approached Sarah, Odette, Michelle, and Jericho to see if they will join his plan. Henry knows that Samantha has made a lot of good relationships and people might stick with her to keep strength in the tribe. While a plan has been put in place, Samantha and Mark cannot help but feel concerned that a plot may be forming against them. Mark speaks with Sarah, Jacqui, and Kent about the vote and he believes all of them showed signs of deception while talking to him. Samantha and Mark hope they can trust their allies and that they'll stick to the plan. At Tribal Council, Samantha makes a plea to the tribe to keep the strongest physical tribe together so they can win the challenges. Samantha knows that people might be judging her as a threat for being very social, but she argues that people who play under the radar are just as dangerous. When the votes are read, Mark and Samantha voted for Michelle. But the rest of the tribe joins Henry and Jacqui's plan to blindside Samantha. Samantha becomes the sixth person voted out of Australian Survivor.
58	7	"Spontaneous and Bombastic"	Days 16-18	14 August 2017
After Tribal Council, Jacqui and Henry celebrate blindsiding Samantha and believe that they got the biggest threat voted out of the game. Mark is furious that his tribe would blindside Samantha and swears to get to the bottom of who plotted against her. Mark shares concern with several people that Henry and Jacqui were behind Samantha's blindside. Kent informs Jacqui and Henry that Mark is throwing their names out as the people who blindsided Samantha. Henry believes that it might be best to vote Mark out next because if he stays around, he might gain more power in the tribe and Henry desires to have full control of Asaga. Mark approaches Luke about the vote and both share concerns that Henry and Jacqui are calling the shots and everyone is too afraid to plot against them. Luke states that he isn't afraid to take anyone on in this game and hopes to split up Henry and Jacqui next. Luke finds it hypocritical that Henry openly criticized Samantha's hard game play, but now Henry is taking on that role behind the scenes. Mark and Luke hope to blindside Jacqui at the next Tribal Council. At Samatau, Locky, Tara, and Anneliese are still on the bottom of the tribe. Locky and Tara hope to convince Ziggy to join with them on the next vote to get rid of AK. Ziggy listens to their plea and debates on what to do. Ziggy is happy to be aligned with AK because he is a smart player, but she also knows she cannot beat AK if he makes it to the end of the game. Ziggy also believes if she saves Locky and Tara, then they will be indebted to her. While Tara tries to work the numbers, Locky is determined to prove his worth to the tribe in camp and in challenges by killing a shark with the machete and providing food for the tribe.: Immunity challenge: Two contestants are pitted against each other on a platform, armed with large padded bags. Their objective is to knock their opponent into the mud. The first tribe to 7 points wins immunity.; Samatau won Immunity. At Asaga, both pairs Henry/Jacqui and Mark/Luke approach the rest of the tribe to convince them to join their side in the vote. Henry and Jacqui hope to vote out Mark at the next Tribal Council while Mark and Luke hope to blindside Jacqui in order to make Henry know what it feels like to lose his partner in the game and to make people see that Henry and Jacqui are a power couple. The tribe is undecided on what to do as many worry that Mark could be a huge physical and social threat down the road whereas Henry and Jacqui have been a powerful strategic force on Asaga. Luke is determined to get rid of Jacqui and approaches several people to tell them the vote has switched to Jacqui. Ben is skeptical that the vote has switched, he doesn't believe Jacqui and Henry are a power couple, and he thinks Luke has a problem with authority in the game. At Tribal Council, there is a discussion regarding whether a strong tribe is one that is more physical or one that is more social and get along with each other. Mark makes a pitch to the tribe, telling them that Henry and Jacqui are pulling the strings, they are a power couple, and they blindsided Samantha. Mark proposes splitting up the power couple and voting out Jacqui because they'll need Henry for challenges. Henry and Jacqui attempt to deny their power couple status and state that Samantha and Mark were the true power couple as they were cuddling together and were inseparable. Jericho makes a plea for the tribe to not vote based on vengeance, but to vote on keeping the tribe strong. Both Henry and Luke believe they are voting based on trust and hope the people they've approached will stick with their promises. When the votes are read, Jericho, Luke, and Mark all voted for Jacqui. However, the remaining members of the tribe sided with Henry and Jacqui and cast their votes for Mark. Mark becomes the seventh person voted out of Australian Survivor.
59	8	"At Least I Can Do My Nails"	Days 19-20	20 August 2017
After Tribal, Jacqui and Henry are pleased to have controlled another vote and gotten rid of Mark. Both are concerned, though, that Mark's final words at Tribal calling them a power couple might make people want to blindside them next. Jericho and Luke are not happy that Mark left, with Jericho even putting out the fire on purpose and swearing privately that he's done with the Asaga tribe. Luke is tired of Jacqui and Henry calling the shots and nobody else seems to mind. Luke is determined to push his agenda to get rid of Jacqui next Tribal Council. The next day, Jacqui and Henry begin to realize that Luke may be the newest threat to their game because he's a very social player, he would win if he got to the end, and he is trying to get the two of them voted out. They decide if they lose the next challenge, they will target Luke.: Reward challenge: Tribemates must transport a ball, balanced on a small platform through an obstacle course. The first tribe to shoot for hoops and hit all four targets wins. If at any point they drop the ball, they will have to go back to the start of the obstacle. The winner tribe won a spa day at an isolate sliding rocks location.; Asaga finally enjoys their first Reward Challenge victory. During the Reward, various tribe members begin to explore the area to see if there are any idol clues or advantages hidden around. Henry spots something that looks like an envelope on one of the tables and grabs it. Both Kent and Luke spot Henry doing this. Luke sees the other table also contains an envelope and he grabs it. However, when both men open the envelopes, there are no idol clues inside: just more hygiene items like tweezers and scissors. At Samatau, Locky, Tara, and Anneliese are still trying to convince Ziggy to flip to their side and get AK voted out. During a rainstorm, Locky and Ziggy work hard to keep the fire going while they both notice AK just resting beside the shelter. Ziggy expresses frustration regarding AK's laziness around camp. Locky sees an opportunity and tells Ziggy that getting rid of AK would benefit the tribe because he perceives him as lazy, not good in challenges, and Locky believes AK likes it when their tribe loses so AK can go on a power trip.: Immunity challenge: In pairs, layers must race out to open three puzzle gates to make way to pull one player on a heavy sled through to the finish line. The tribe to light the cauldron first wins.; Asaga wins Immunity. Back at Samatau, AK, Tessa, Jarrad, Ziggy, and Peter agree to get rid of Tara. However, the alliance is concerned about an idol coming into play. They observe that if they throw their votes against one person and they play the idol, Locky, Tara, and Anneliese decide who goes home. They also note that with five votes, they can not split the vote evenly. Therefore, AK decides to approach Anneliese and tells her if she votes with their alliance tonight in the split vote, she'll put herself in a better position. Anneliese is conflicted because she wants to stay loyal to Locky and Tara, but she also knows she's at risk of leaving soon if she doesn't make a move. While AK is putting his plan into action, Locky and Tara approach Ziggy again. Tara knows that if something doesn't change, she is going next, and tells Ziggy that tonight is a good night to get rid of AK as he will be a huge strategic threat down the road. Ziggy realizes that she is the swing vote tonight. Ziggy does tell Tara and Locky later that day that she will vote with them tonight. Tara is hopeful that tonight will be her opportunity to finally get rid of AK. At Tribal Council, discussion centers around the new alliance on the tribe and whether there is any hope for Locky, Anneliese, or Tara. When the voting takes place, it is revealed that Ziggy sticks with her alliance with AK. It is also revealed Anneliese stayed with Locky and Tara. Anneliese, Locky, and Tara vote for AK, Peter and AK vote for Locky, and Tessa, Ziggy, and Jarrad vote for Tara. The vote is tied between AK and Tara. The tribe is told to vote again to break the tie. During the revote, the majority cast their votes for Tara. Tara becomes the eighth person voted out of Australian Survivor. However, when Tara goes to have her torch snuffed, Jonathan states that Tara is not leaving alone and that Samatau will have to vote out another member from their tribe. While the voting takes place, Ziggy, Tessa, and AK all yell out that they are voting for Anneliese to signal the other alliance members to vote for her and stating that she should have worked with them tonight. When the votes are read, the majority are for Anneliese. Anneliese becomes the ninth person voted out of Australian Survivor. As Tara and Anneliese go to have their torches snuffed, Jonathan informs them that they have been voted out, but they have not been voted out of the game. Jonathan states that they are going to Exile Beach and they will join the Asaga Tribe tomorrow. Therefore, nobody was voted out of the game this episode.
60	9	"Yogapants and Sideshow Bob"	Days 21-22	21 August 2017
On Exile Beach, Tara and Anneliese are still dealing with the after effects of being voted out of Samatau. Both are determined, though, to overcome this elimination and fight their way to gain power in the game again. On Asaga, small tensions have risen as Jacqui and Kent are growing annoyed with Michelle's perceived laziness around camp and Ben being a klutz. Luke is still determined to get rid of Jacqui at the next Tribal Council and cripple Henry and Jacqui's power in the game that they currently have. Asaga arrives on Exile Beach the next day and Jonathan informs them that Tara and Anneliese will join Asaga, but this means that two people from Asaga will have to join Samatau. After some discussion, Ben and Henry both volunteer to go over to Samatau. The tribe is not thrilled to see Henry leave and try to talk him out of it, but Henry agrees to switch. Therefore, Tara and Anneliese join Asaga, then Ben and Henry join Samatau. At the new Asaga, Jacqui is completely shocked that Henry left her alone on Asaga and took the idol with him. Jacqui begins to feel more vulnerable with Henry gone and worries that Luke will make a move against her. Jacqui and Kent begin to push for the remaining Asaga members to stay Asaga strong and vote out Tara and Anneliese. However, Luke and Michelle take the opportunity to pull Tara and Anneliese aside to fill them in on what was going on in Asaga before and that Jacqui and Henry were running the camp. Luke believes that Jacqui is feeling more vulnerable without Henry being around and he thinks that this is his opportunity to make a move. At the new Samatau, Henry states that the reason he flipped was because he wants to establish as many relationships as possible to advance himself to the end. Henry believes that Asaga is solid and in his control no matter what tribe he is on. The rest of Samatau is surprised that Henry is there. AK is concerned with Henry being on Samatau because he is strong, a great game player, and AK worries Henry could work his charm and change the course of his game. Locky sees a great opportunity to work with Henry moving forward in order to blindside AK and brings Henry up to speed on what was going on at Samatau before.: Immunity challenge: Three members from each tribe must race through the water to get control of the ball. They will then pass the ball onto a fourth member on a platform, who will kick it in. The first tribe to kick three goals wins.; Samatau won the challenge. At Asaga, Jacqui, Kent, and Odette are committed to staying Asaga strong and voting out Tara. However, Luke, Michelle, and Jericho want to make a move against Jacqui in order to weaken Henry's power in the game and remove his number one ally. Michelle talks with Tara and Anneliese and tells them to vote out Jacqui tonight. Tara and Anneliese thought that Asaga was strong, but it is obvious that the tribe has divisions they can take advantage of. Sarah is also approached by both sides to vote with them and she realizes that she is in the middle. However, when Sarah is seen talking to Jericho for a long period of time, Jacqui begins to believe that Sarah is playing both sides and really can not be trusted. Jacqui and Kent decide to switch up the game and get rid of Sarah instead to prevent her from making a move against them. In order to get the numbers, Jacqui and Kent approach Anneliese and Tara to convince them to vote against Sarah tonight in order to build a long term alliance with them. Anneliese and Tara are shocked to have found themselves as the swing votes, in the end, and know that the next decision they make will be crucial to their games moving forward. At Tribal Council, the tribe discusses the impact of Henry flipping, Tara and Anneliese's positions in the game, and whether Asaga is truly a united tribe. When the votes are read, Anneliese and Tara have decided to join with Luke, Jericho, and Michelle, and cast their votes for Jacqui. With six votes, Jacqui becomes the eighth person voted out of Australian Survivor.
61	10	"Opening Up Shop"	Days 22-24	27 August 2017
After Tribal, Luke and Michelle celebrate blindsiding Jacqui and are anxious to see Henry's face when he finds out they blindsided his closest ally. Anneliese and Tara are also happy that they are both still in the game and have found cracks in Asaga that they can use to survive a few more rounds. However, Kent and Odette are feeling on the outs after Jacqui's blindside and are feeling very sour at the rest of their tribe for not staying Asaga strong. Kent particularly feels like he is a dead man walking around camp and believes he will be the next to leave. The rest of the tribe takes note of Kent's attitude shift and wonder if he has thrown in the towel. At Samatau, Ben believes that switching tribes was the best thing he could have done as he felt on the outs at Asaga and feels more accepted at Samatau. Jarrad approaches Ben and tells him he'd like to work with him moving forward and get rid of Henry next. While Ben does trust Henry, he is also willing to do whatever it takes to survive. However, Henry is feeling like the most powerful person in the game as he has solid ties to Asaga and believes that he is making good relationships on Samatau.: Reward challenge: Half of the tribe will push a heavy cart filled with puzzle pieces to the end of a course. At the end of the course, two tribe members will hold up the top of a palm tree puzzle, while two other members work on the puzzle. The first tribe to complete their puzzle first wins a trip to an ice cream parlor.; At the Reward site, Asaga is enjoying their ice cream reward when Anneliese discovers a slip of paper in her ice cream cone. She finds out it is a clue to a Hidden Immunity Idol and the other clue is hidden in a palm tree at the site. Anneliese is able to grab the clue and finds out that a Hidden Immunity Idol will be hidden at the next Immunity Challenge site. Anneliese believes that she needs help to get the idol so she uses this opportunity to build an alliance with Sarah. Sarah confesses to Anneliese that she feels on the bottom of her alliance with Luke, Jericho, and Michelle and believes that working with Anneliese will be beneficial to her. Anneliese discovers that the idol will be hidden before the puzzle station, but she thinks it would be suspicious for her not to do the puzzle since she's good at them. Anneliese gives Sarah the task of getting the idol for her and believes this will be a huge moment of trust for the two. Back at Samatau, Henry is shocked and devastated that Jacqui has been voted out. Henry thought he had everything organized for Asaga moving forward, but he knows that Luke, Jericho, and Michelle flipped the vote and blindsided Jacqui. Henry is now realizing that his position in the game is not as solid as he thought, Samatau appears very united, and he thinks that he is next to go. Henry knows he needs to improve his position on the tribe and he tries to bring everyone together by playing a game on the beach. AK believes that Henry is the stronger, more likable version of himself and AK sees right through Henry as being a charmer. AK knows he needs to move against Henry soon before he changes up the tribe.: Immunity challenge: Six members of the tribe will work together to move discs to the end of a rope. After they've released the discs, they will roll them into a barrel. Once their in the barrel, they will load them into a chute to release a key. The last two members of the tribe will then use the key to unlock a chest containing puzzle pieces that they will use to solve a puzzle. First tribe to complete their puzzle wins.; The challenge is a complete blowout with Samatau securing victory, and Anneliese is able to grab the idol unseen. Additionally, Henry takes the opportunity to slip a Hidden Immunity Idol clue to Jericho. Back at camp, Kent is feeling vulnerable but decides not to run around and scramble. Kent sits down on the beach and decides that he is open for business and hopes people will approach him and talk to him. Tara does sit down with Kent and Kent expresses a desire to see Michelle go as she is the weakest on the tribe. Tara believes that voting out Michelle might be a good move because it will continue to break Asaga apart and get rid of a weak link. However, Luke is intent on keeping his alliance strong and sending Kent home next as he was close with Henry. Luke and Michelle know that Kent is putting up a fight to get Michelle voted out, but they hope Tara and Anneliese stay loyal with them as they saved the two of them last Tribal. Sarah also talks with Kent and believes that Kent can provide strength for the tribe. Kent proposes to Sarah that the two of them along with Odette, Tara, and Anneliese make five votes and they could have the majority. Sarah considers it because it would be a good opportunity for her to get power in the game. At Tribal Council, discussion revolves around whether Asaga should keep a tribe with strength or a tribe that gets along better. There are varying opinions among the different contestants. The tribe notes that Kent and Michelle butt heads a lot in camp and the challenges. Michelle and Kent continue to campaign at Tribal Council to get the other one voted out and tell the tribe how they will benefit everyone moving forward. When the voting takes place, Kent and Odette vote for Michelle, Luke throws a vote towards Odette, but Anneliese, Jericho, Michelle, Sarah, and Tara vote for Kent. Kent becomes the ninth person voted out of Australian Survivor.
62	11	"Deep in the Mangroves"	Days 25-26	28 August 2017
On Asaga, Odette is devastated that she has lost both Jacqui and Kent as allies in the game. Odette knows that she is the next person on the chopping block to leave and is feeling like her position in the game is hopeless. Jericho takes the Hidden Immunity Idol clue he received to go search for the idol. Jericho believes that people perceive him as helpless and struggling in the game and he plans to use that as a strategy to help him move forward. While Jericho believes the clue is real, Henry reveals in a confessional that he gave Jericho the clue to the idol that he obtained earlier in the game with Jacqui. Henry is hoping that he would be able to reestablish his relationships with Asaga by giving Jericho the clue. On Samatau, the tribe is feeling exhausted from a lack of food and the tribe's flint has also broken so they've been without fire for two days. AK can tell Locky is frustrated with no fire and he hopes that Locky will finally explode and give AK an excuse to vote him out. AK intentionally goes up to Locky and makes comments about Locky's fire making skills. Locky knows what AK is trying to do and keeps his cool despite feeling frustrated. Both tribes receive tree mail and discover that everyone has received a care package from home. Odette receives a photo of her mother and she reveals her mother was killed in a car accident when she was fourteen-years-old. Henry also shares in private that he received his mother's charm necklace and his mother died from cancer six weeks before the game started. Everyone's spirits are lifted by receiving the care packages. Before the Challenge, Samatau brings all of their rewards they've won to bargain for a new flint. Jonathan agrees to the deal. Jonathan then informs the tribe that they are not playing for Immunity today, but instead competing for someone in the game to have a chance to win the Ultimate Reward.: Reward challenge: One by one, three members of the tribe will jump off a platform in the water to grab a key and swim it to shore. Once all three keys are retrieved, they will unlock a chest containing pieces of a block puzzle. Two members of the tribe will work on the puzzle, and once complete, the final two members will use sandbags to knock off the puzzle. The tribe to knock off all pieces of their puzzle wins. The winning tribe goes to tribal council where they will vote one of their own to play for the "ultimate reward".; Samatau won the challenge. Back at camp, the tribe ponders about what the Ultimate Reward could be. Locky hopes that the tribe will choose him because he wants to get the reward and improve his position in the game. However, AK is determined to make sure that his alliance gets the Ultimate Reward for their alliance. AK and Jarrad discuss sending either Tessa or Ziggy because they worry if one of them is sent, it'll put more unwanted attention on them. At Tribal Council, Jonathan reveals that the tribe will be voting for one person on Samatau to compete for the chance at the Ultimate Reward. Jonathan does reveal some information: the reward does not involve Asaga, the reward could benefit one person or the entire tribe, the person will be going away over night, but will return to camp the next day. The tribe discusses putting their best person forward that is well-rounded in all kinds of challenges so that they will win. Locky offers to go, stating that he is the strongest person. However, others believes that Ziggy might be the best well-rounded player and should be the one to go. The voting takes place and Ziggy is chosen to compete for the Ultimate Reward. Ziggy goes to Exile Beach and reads the note. Ziggy is given the opportunity to find a Super Idol. The Super Idol has two powers: it will cancel someone else's idol if that idol is played at Tribal Council and it will also provide safety for one person when played at Tribal Council. Ziggy has until sunrise to find it. Ziggy searches for over six hours and is able to find the idol. Ziggy celebrates her discovery and plans to keep the identity of the idol to herself.
63	12	"The King of the Jungle"	Days 27-28	3 September 2017
After finding the Super Idol, Ziggy returns to Samatau and decides that she's going to lie about her discovery. She tells Samatau that if she tells anyone about the power, then it becomes null and void, that she can not use it herself, and it's a power that could either help her or hurt her depending on how the person uses it. While AK, Tessa, and Jarrad are glad that the Ultimate Reward is within their alliance, AK believes that Ziggy is withholding information about the Ultimate Reward and he is concerned how that will affect her game. When the tribes arrive for the Reward Challenge, Jonathan congratulates all of them for making the halfway point, but he thinks that's a great time to change things up and announces the tribes will be switched up. AK, Jericho, Luke, Odette, Peter, Sarah, and Tara form the new Asaga tribe whilst Anneliese, Ben, Henry, Jarrad, Locky, Michelle, Ziggy, and Tessa form the new Samatau tribe.: Reward challenge: Members from each tribe must face-off one at a time and aim to knock down their opponent's hand-held idol to the ground. The first tribe to seven points wins a personalized sweet treat and in addition, all the rewards Samatau had given up (comfort item & fishing gear) in a previous challenge.; Asaga won the challenge. At the new Asaga, AK is very concerned about his position because he's in the minority with Peter and he knows that Tara is out for revenge after AK voted her out of Samatau. However, AK has pulled himself up from the bottom before and he believes he can do it again. AK believes that Luke is in charge of Asaga and Jericho is tight with him. AK believes that Sarah and Odette are in the middle of the tribe so AK approaches both of them to convince them he's not the big schemer Tara makes him out to be and that he wants to work with them. Tara observes AK strategizing and attempts to warn Luke and Jericho of AK's gameplay. In order to give AK a false sense of security, Luke approaches AK and proposes an all male alliance to get rid of the girls but states in private that the alliance is not real and Luke is looking to take AK out of the game because he's a huge threat. At the new Samatau, Locky is extremely happy that AK is no longer on the tribe and he doesn't feel like he's on the bottom. While Locky is happy, Anneliese is not happy to be back on the tribe that voted her out but she puts on an act to try and work herself back in with the tribe. Michelle is very concerned because she's the only new member from Asaga to join and she feels on the bottom. Michelle attempts to turn on her social game to establish new connections, but her talking annoys Locky. Henry and Locky consider getting Michelle out at the tribe's first Tribal Council.: Immunity challenge: One male and one female from each tribe must hold up a bucket while the opposing tribe fill it as much water as they can. The last player standing wins Immunity for their tribe.; Samatau won the challenge. Back at camp, Luke reaffirms the all male alliance with AK, but states to the rest of Asaga that the alliance is fake and AK is leaving. AK wants to believe Luke, but he notices Luke and Tara spending too much time together and believes that Luke might be playing him. AK approaches Sarah and Odette to convince them to join his side because if he leaves, he believes the two of them will end up on the bottom of Asaga if the tribe goes back to Tribal. Both Sarah and Odette debate which side they should join on the vote. Meanwhile, Tara is very concerned that AK might be able to turn the tables on her at the last minute because he's a very good talker and has worked himself out of a corner before. Tara decides to remain calm and hope that everyone is telling her the truth about the vote. At Tribal Council, the tribe discusses the swap and how it has affected them. Tara and AK both recount their history together on Samatau and how it is affecting their game on the new Asaga. Both believe that one of them will be voted out tonight and they hope the people they've talked to will come through for them. When the votes are read, AK and Peter voted for Tara, but the rest of Asaga cast their votes to get rid of the strong strategic player, AK. AK becomes the tenth person voted out of Australian Survivor.
64	13	"Hanging on the Edge of a Cliff With My Nails"	Days 29-30	4 September 2017
Back at Asaga, Luke and Tara celebrate blindsiding AK out of the game and feel that they've made the biggest move in the game to date. Peter is feeling on the outs of the tribe and feels he will be next. However, Sarah hopes to keep Peter around for her game because she's finding Luke to be an erratic game player, he's unpredictable, and he has too much power in the game. Sarah also hopes to use Peter's connections with Samatau to advance forward. On Samatau, with AK gone, the power has shifted in the game. Ziggy, Henry, Locky, Tessa, Anneliese, and Jarrad have all formed a majority on the tribe leaving Ben and Michelle on the outs. Ziggy has set up her own alliance with Henry and Locky in order to protect the physical threats at the merge. However, after Ziggy decides to place trust in her alliance and reveals she has an idol, Henry and Locky believe that Ziggy is becoming too powerful. Henry and Locky decide that Ziggy isn't an immediate threat because she has no ties to the other tribe, but they do decide to form another alliance between the two of them and Anneliese. Anneliese is concerned because she doesn't trust Henry and tests him to see if he has an idol and if he gave the idol clue to Jericho. While Henry initially denies this, he pulls Anneliese aside in private and reveals he does have an idol and he did give Jericho an idol clue. This causes Anneliese to believe that she can trust Henry and she hopes to move forward with him. Meanwhile, Michelle is very aware that she's on the bottom of the tribe and is trying to paint a target on Ben. Michelle states that Ben is an unpredictable player who likes to show off and reveal secrets. Michelle is able to get Ben to reveal his thoughts on the Ultimate Reward being a super idol and states that he wants to see if AK's former allies will vote out Locky. Michelle believes that she has enough information to start plotting against Ben.: Immunity challenge: Tribemates must hold heavy sandbags tethered to water-filled troughs above their head. If they could not continue, tribemates had the option to drop out and pass their sandbag to another tribe member. The first tribe to tip the balance of the water troughs loses the challenge.; Asaga won the challenge. Back at Samatau, the majority six debate between voting out Michelle or Ben. Initially, the tribe decides to keep Ben because they don't perceive him to be a threat, Jarrad has put a lot of trust in Ben, and the tribe worries about Michelle's relationships on Asaga. Michelle believes that if she gets Locky on her side, then Ben will leave. Michelle reveals to Locky that Ben talked to her about getting Locky voted out. When he hears this, Locky gets angry and decides he wants to change the target to Ben. The tribe continues to debate whether voting out Michelle or Ben is the better move. Jarrad cautions the tribe that Michelle has just proven today how good she is at planting ideas whereas Ben does not have a strong strategic game. However, the tribe also notes that Ben can come off as very vague so it is hard to read him. At Tribal Council, the debate continues over whether Michelle or Ben will leave. Both make arguments for why they should stay with Michelle stating that Ben is indecisive, he's flip flopped on votes, and nobody can ever get a read on him. Michelle then reveals that Ben told her the tribe's secret discussions about the Ultimate Reward. Once she reveals this, Ziggy is particularly upset that Ben would do this. There is continuous whispering throughout the council area to determine if Ben or Michelle should leave. Ben tells Samatau that he is going to stay loyal to them moving forward and has always been loyal. When the votes are cast, the tribe decides that they can no longer trust Ben and he receives five votes. Ben becomes the eleventh person voted out of Australian Survivor.
65	14	"Absolute Chaos"	Days 31-32	10 September 2017
On Asaga, Sarah believes that the other players underestimate her because she's a model, but she hopes to use that to her advantage to finally make a move. Sarah approaches Peter with a plan to blindside Luke at their next Tribal Council because he's been running the game for too long. Peter is hopeful that Sarah's move will work as he knows he's on the bottom of the tribe. However, Luke has observed that Sarah has been distancing herself from him and has been playing both sides. Luke hopes to make a move against Sarah before she can get him. On Samatau, Henry believes the tribe made a mistake voting Ben out instead of Michelle. Henry believes that Michelle is the most dangerous player in the game and he worries that she will realize the close bonds Henry has on both tribes and will take him out.: Reward challenge: One member will be the caller while everyone else will be blindfolded. The caller will guide the tribe into a pen where one at a time they will use clubs to smash open watermelons to reveal sandbags. Once the tribe retrieves all the sandbags, the caller will use a catapult to launch the sandbags into a net. The first tribe to get their sandbags into the net will win an Italian feast of pasta, red wine, and garlic bread.; Samatau win and are given the choice of taking two people from Asaga with them to the reward. Samatau chooses Peter and Sarah. At the Reward, Sarah hopes to take advantage of the time to build relationships and she talks with Henry. Henry tells Sarah that he wants to include her in a five person alliance at the merge. Sarah tells Henry that she plans to take out Luke before the merge. Peter also talks with his old Samatau allies and tells them that Sarah can be trusted. Back at Asaga, Luke is very concerned that Sarah was chosen for the reward and believes that Sarah will share tribe secrets with Samatau. Luke approaches Tara and Odette with a plan to vote Sarah out at the next Tribal Council. Luke does not plan on telling Jericho because he would likely not go for the plan, so he is going to let Jericho think the vote is still for Peter while the other three would vote Sarah. When Sarah and Peter return, Tara does reveal to them that Luke expressed concern about Sarah's loyalty to Asaga. Sarah is glad to know that Luke is targeting her because she can now make her move with very few repercussions. Tara hopes that Sarah does not reveal their discussion to Luke because, otherwise, Luke will not be happy. Back at Samatau, Michelle hopes to paint a target on someone else in the tribe in order to save herself. Michelle knows how big of a player Henry is and that he slipped an idol clue to Jericho at a challenge. Michelle tells Samatau that Henry is playing both sides and reveals the idol clue he gave to Jericho. Locky is concerned about Michelle stating this because he wants to protect Henry, but he doesn't know how the tribe will react to this.: Immunity challenge: Two tribe members will race to untie a tower of planks revealing bags of puzzle pieces. They will use the planks to build a staircase to the puzzle deck where two tribemates will put together a hanging puzzle from hooks. The tribe that finishes the puzzle first wins Immunity.; After the challenge, Jonathan reveals to Samatau that they are also going to get the privilege of watching Asaga's Tribal Council tonight. Back at Asaga, Luke and Sarah try to convince the rest of the tribe to vote the other one out. Luke's plan anticipates that Peter and Sarah will vote for him, Jericho will vote for Peter, and then he, Tara, and Odette will vote Sarah out. Sarah hopes to convince Odette to join with her and Peter as Odette has always voted with the majority and hasn't aligned herself with anyone. Odette observes that while she hasn't joined an alliance yet, she might need to tonight because it'll help her establish numbers for the merge. Odette finds herself in the middle, but Tara also believes she is a swing vote because both Luke and Sarah are trying to take control of the game and she needs to make the best decision for her. Tara attempts to talk to Jericho to let him know that Sarah is the real target, not Peter, but Jericho does not believe her. However, Jericho knows that if Sarah and Luke do target each other that is bad for his game. Jericho does sit down with Sarah and Luke to see if they can talk through their differences, but the conversation does not go well as Sarah brings up Luke's comments regarding whether he could trust her. Jericho hopes that Asaga can get over their differences and vote out Peter tonight, or he feels that they will be in trouble at the merge. At Tribal Council, it is clear that the tribe has not yet decided what they are going to do. The tribe discusses Sarah and Peter going on the Reward and Sarah reveals that she is a target tonight because people do not trust her. Sarah brings up the comments Luke had made earlier about her loyalty. At that point, Luke tells the tribe that the easiest and smartest thing for them to do tonight is vote out Peter. Peter argues that voting him out is not smart as he has connections to Samatau and he can help his tribe in the merge. Jericho whispers to Sarah that if she does not vote for Peter, it will be a mistake for her. Sarah whispers back that Jericho needs to trust that she knows what is happening at the merge. Sarah informs everyone that she is not budging on her position and she stands by her vote. Tara expresses to everyone that the tribe really doesn't know what is going to happen because so many names and plans have been thrown around today. Before the tribe can vote, Jonathan reveals that there is a twist tonight. Jonathan states that someone is leaving Asaga, but they are not leaving the game. Jonathan states that one member from Asaga will be allowed to mutiny and join Asaga. Despite pleas from Sarah not to leave, Peter does stand up and states that he wants to mutiny. Peter rejoins Samatau and nobody is voted out of the game.
66	15	"One Night Stand"	Days 33-34	11 September 2017
Back at Asaga, the entire tribe is still reeling from the Tribal Council they just attended. Everyone is beginning to wonder if the tribe can ever find trust in each other again and whether they will be able to put up a united front at the merge. Jericho believes that the strong alliance he has made with Luke and Sarah will no longer exist after tonight. The next morning, it appears that Sarah and Tara have formed a pair and Luke and Jericho remain a pair with Odette in the middle. Odette believes that she is the swing vote on the tribe as she could go with either pair. Odette states that part of her strategy has been to not strategize or join an alliance with the hope that she would not be seen as a threat. However, Sarah believes that Odette's lack of strategizing actually makes her a threat because she's not someone that can be persuaded. Sarah is concerned that Odette always seems to go with the majority and worries she will flip at the merge to save herself. Despite the fallout between her and Luke, Sarah is still open to working with Luke if it takes her farther in the game and the two propose a plan to vote Odette out if the tribe loses again. Luke is aware that he brought a lot of attention to himself at the last Tribal and is feeling vulnerable. However, he still has doubts about whether he can work with Sarah going forward. At Samatau, Peter is glad to have rejoined Samatau and believes he made the right move. Jarrad, Tessa, and Ziggy are glad to have Peter back in their alliance. However, Peter's presence worries Henry and Locky as they believe they are now back on the bottom of the tribe. Peter warns Tessa that Henry can easily flip back over to Asaga after the merge, so Jarrad and Tessa contemplate taking Henry out if they lose the next Immunity Challenge.: Immunity challenge: The tribes will hang onto a rope connected to a steep A Frame. As their arms tire, they will let go of the rope and fall into the water. Last tribe with a person hanging onto the A Frame will win Immunity.; The Immunity Challenges comes down to a tough battle between Jericho and Ziggy. After a more than two hour battle, Jericho finally drops and Samatau wins Immunity. Back at Asaga, three different plans are formed. At one point, Luke/Jericho and Sarah/Tara all agree to vote out Odette. However, Jericho is not sure that he can trust Sarah and speaks with Odette about voting Sarah out as she's been playing the middle and is not to be trusted. Sarah wants to make sure Odette doesn't suspect anything so she proposes to Odette that she is the swing vote tonight and asks her to vote out Luke. Odette finds that she is the swing vote and debates what to do. Odette believes that Sarah has more connections than Luke, but she also finds that Luke would be a good shield for her at the merge. At Tribal Council, the tribe discusses the drama from the last Tribal Council and whether the trust has been rebuilt in Asaga or not. The tribe notes that there was a lot said at the last Tribal Council and everyone is concerned about where the alliances stand at this point. The tribe discusses looking at the merge and how tonight's vote could be important in deciding how far you go in the merge. After the votes are cast, Luke and Sarah have decided that they can place trust in each other again and can not take the risk that Odette will stay with them after merge. With four votes, Odette becomes the twelfth person voted out of Australian Survivor.
67	16	"This is Where the War Really Begins"	Days 35-36	17 September 2017
On the morning of Day 35, Asaga and Samatau finally merge into one tribe. The tribe immediately proceeds to the first Reward Challenge.: Reward challenge: The contestants will swing a large pendulum around a bottle and through a frame. If they touch the frame and their bottle falls, they're out of the challenge. Last person left with their bottle standing will win reward. The reward consists of a rejuvenation package of clean clothes, a massage, hygiene items, and a three course meal, along with a letter from their loved ones back at home.; After a fierce competition, Tessa wins the Reward. However, Jonathan presents her with a choice. If Tessa gives up the rejuvenation package, then every single person in the tribe, including her, will be allowed to receive their letters from home. Tessa decides to give up the reward. Back at camp, everyone is able to enjoy their letters. Peter is particularly touched by the letter he received from his father and discusses how Peter coming out had affected their relationship in the past. Michelle believes that Tessa made the right call to give everyone the letters because, otherwise, she would have been voted out next. As it stands, Asaga believes they are going into the merge as underdogs with four tribe members to Samatau's eight. Sarah, Jericho, Luke, and Tara know that if they cannot pull anyone over to their side, they will be picked off one by one. However, they find a bit of luck in that Henry is interested in returning to Asaga as he realizes he is on the bottom of Samatau. Henry proposes to the other four that they talk with Michelle and Locky to see if they can blindside Ziggy at the next Tribal. Anneliese, Jarrad, Peter, Tessa, and Ziggy are locked in to stay Samatau strong. However, Tessa and Jarrad express concerns over whether Michelle and Locky will stay with them as Michelle has friends on Asaga and Locky has a strong connection with Tara. Initially, Sarah does approach Michelle to see if she will rejoin Asaga, but Michelle is not interested as she doesn't believe Asaga has the numbers. Jarrad and Tessa propose to the others that they blindside Henry at this first Tribal because he is going to be a huge physical and social threat moving forward.: Immunity challenge: The contestants will balance between two rails in a plank position. As the challenge wears on, the contestants' bodies will tire and they will fall off. The last person remaining between the two rails in the plank position will win Immunity.; After a fierce competition between Henry, Tessa, and Ziggy, Ziggy wins the first Individual Immunity. Back at camp, the original Samatau members express doubt about targeting Henry first because they worry he might have an idol. Tessa and Jarrad propose that they vote Luke out first as they don't think he has an idol and they know it won't harm their alliance because it would be hard to convince Locky to get rid of Henry first. The alliance comes to an agreement to target Luke. In an effort to get more numbers on their side, Jarrad does approach Jericho with an interest in working with him and if he votes out Luke, then it would show Jarrad he can be trusted. Jericho entertains the idea and Jarrad suggests to Jericho that they both underline their votes to show who they voted for. However, the former Asaga and Henry try to convince Locky and Michelle to flip over with them. Henry proposes that they vote out Jarrad because he is close to Ziggy and because Ziggy won Immunity. Locky and Michelle are both on the fence about what to do. Locky is extremely worried because if he does flip, then he knows he'll be upsetting the members of Samatau and be exposed as a double agent. As the day goes on, Michelle begins to notice the original Samatau members having conversations that she is not a part of. When Michelle confronts Tessa about this, Tessa does admit that some members of Samatau still have concern about Michelle because she was the last person let into the alliance. Michelle is very unsettled by this revelation. Locky and Michelle begin to discuss their options as they both feel like they are in the middle. At Tribal Council, the tribe discusses how the game has become individual, the importance of numbers, and whether the tribal lines are going to stick together or if there will be blending. There is an observation that many individuals have spent time on both tribes. Michelle does admit during Tribal that yesterday she knew what she was going to do but after today, she is not sure. This causes some of the Samatau members to wonder aloud whether their plan isn't solid. Michelle acknowledges that tonight's vote will affect everything moving forward and could determine whether some people will win or lose this game. When the votes are cast, it is revealed that Michelle and Locky flip to Asaga with Michelle citing what happened earlier and Locky citing Samatau wanting to target Henry as their reasons for flipping. Locky and Michelle with Henry, Jericho, Luke, Sarah, and Tara to blindside Jarrad. Jarrad becomes the thirteenth person voted out of Australian Survivor and becomes the first member of the Jury.
68	17	"Jamgate"	Days 37-38	18 September 2017
Back at camp, the former Samatau Alliance is feeling shocked that Jarrad has left and try to figure out whether Anneliese or Locky flipped. Locky privately states that he flipped because Samatau was targeting Henry and he didn't want to see him leave. However, Locky doesn't own up to flipping to his allies and tries to pin the blame on Anneliese. Anneliese is very upset that Locky flipped and won't even own up to it. Anneliese knows that she can no longer trust Locky and debates using her idol at the next Tribal Council to flip things back in Samatau's favor. Later, Henry tries to reestablish trust with former Asaga by pretending to discover the idol with Jericho based on the clue he gave Jericho before the merge. Jericho cannot believe that Henry found the idol when he had been searching for days. In the middle of the night, Henry, Jericho, and Luke eat the rest of the tribe's jam. Later, Henry proposes to Locky that they vote Anneliese out next because she didn't vote with them last Tribal and because they know she has an idol. As people discuss voting out Anneliese, they also start to believe that she was the one that stole the jam last night. Later, Ziggy begins to observe that Locky was the one who flipped and she debates whether she also needs to join a new alliance or try to make something work with former Samatau with her Super Idol.: Immunity challenge: The challenge is divided into three rounds. In the first round, the first six people to land a hook on a rope will move to Round Two. In the second round, the first three people to navigate their way through a tethered rope course will move on to the final round. In the final round, the three will roll their balls up a ramp and onto a ledge. The first player to get three balls on the ledge will win Immunity. Jericho, Henry, and Locky make it to the final round. (Henry Wins).; Back at camp, Luke, Jericho, Tara, Sarah, Henry, Locky, and Michelle all agree to vote Anneliese out. Locky offers himself as a false target for people to cast votes towards him, but he is concerned that if Anneliese plays her idol, he'll go home. Locky tries to see if Anneliese will give him the idol to protect him, but Anneliese sees through his ruse and both know that one of them will be the next voted out. Anneliese tries to rally Peter, Tessa, and Ziggy to vote for Locky while she plays her idol. Ziggy debates keeping Locky in the game because he will always be more of a physical threat than her. Ziggy does propose working with Henry and Locky moving forward and the two are very receptive to the idea. Ziggy realizes that if she plays her super idol tonight, Anneliese goes home, but if she doesn't, then Locky will go home. At Tribal, the tribe discusses the jam thief, how the tribal lines changed after the last vote, and that the lines could change again with this vote. Henry specifically states that his vote is going towards a person that has flipped back and forth several times. When the votes are cast, Anneliese decides to play her idol. However, Ziggy plays her super idol negating Anneliese's idol and protecting herself. Had Ziggy not done this, Anneliese would have saved herself with the idol, as Anneliese ends up receiving eight votes to eliminate her. Anneliese becomes the fourteenth person voted out of Australian Survivor and the second member of the Jury.
69	18	"The Champagne Alliance"	TBA	19 September 2017
Back at camp, Peter and Tessa are left blindsided, again, due to Ziggy flipping and using her idol to get out Anneliese. Both believe they will be picked off next. Ziggy believes she made the right decision as Henry and Locky are both powerful players in a more solid alliance. Henry and Locky feel confident moving forward as Henry has the idol and they don't feel they have much competition left in the game.: Reward challenge: It is the Survivor Auction! Each person is given $500 to spend on the items up for bid. Once a person runs out of money, they can no longer bid. If two people bid the highest amount for an item, they will draw rocks to determine who gets the item.; Luke buys a piece of paper that eliminates him from the auction, but guarantees him any item purchased at the auction. Ziggy, Henry, Locky, and Jericho win food, Sarah gets a zonk when she buys a frozen coconut, Michelle loses a rock draw to Locky, Tara gets a phone call home, and Peter wins an advantage at the next Immunity Challenge. Tessa wins a luxurious night away from camp with a bed and pizza. She can choose one person to join her and she chooses Michelle. Luke also gets to go along due to his auction prize. Back at camp, Sarah appears bitter for Tessa choosing Michelle to go on the Reward. Locky expresses concern that Tessa will try to plot against him at the Reward, but Henry isn't convinced that Tessa can pull the numbers to her side. However, Sarah's anger is really a ruse and she acted bitter to make Henry feel more secure. Sarah is actually hoping to blindside Henry as he has become too powerful and is the biggest all around threat left in the game. Sarah reveals to Jericho that Anneliese told her about Henry faking the idol discovery. Upon hearing this, Jericho shares her sentiments that Henry needs to go. At the Reward site, Tessa pitches to Michelle and Luke that Locky, Henry, and Ziggy are a tight trio that need broken up. Michelle believes that Henry is the bigger threat over Locky. Michelle decides to reveal to Tessa that Henry has an idol. Upon hearing this, the three form the Champagne Alliance and set a goal to blindside Henry at the next Tribal Council.: Immunity challenge: The contestants will stand on a balance beam and balance a ball on a wooden bow. At regular intervals, they will move down the beam to narrower perches. If they fall off or drop the ball, they're out. Last person standing wins Immunity.; Peter and Luke's advantage is they can both start 30 seconds after the other contestants at any stage of the competition. Both are unable to capitalize on their advantage, but Tessa pulls out a necessary Immunity win. Back at camp, a steady rainfall forces the contestants to take shelter, keeping strategy talks to a bare minimum. Tessa is able to pull Peter aside and tell him the new plan. Locky and Henry try to steer the target towards Peter and also try to create a fake plan with Tessa and Peter. Locky worries that if Peter has an idol, he'll be idoled out of the game. He follows after Tessa and Peter to make sure they do not. Michelle is also able to share with Sarah the plan for Henry's blindside. However, the players are concerned that they haven't had a lot of time to talk and if Henry catches wind of their plan, he'll play the idol. At Tribal, the tribe discusses the overnight reward and if it impacted the game. Tessa states that since she's on the bottom, she used it as an opportunity to make friends. Both Henry and Ziggy don't believe Tessa was able to make a new plan at the Reward. The tribe discusses what makes a player unbeatable: physical strength or other attributes. When asked about the vote, most of the group indicates there is a group consensus and they won't rock the boat tonight. After the votes, Locky whispers to Henry that he should play his idol, but Henry decides not to. However, this results in his demise as the Champagne Alliance of Jericho, Luke, Michelle, Peter, Sarah, and Tessa successfully blindside Henry. Henry becomes the fifteenth person voted out of Australian Survivor and the third member of the jury.
70	19	"Desperate Times, Desperate Measures"	TBA	24 September 2017
Back at camp, the new Champagne Alliance celebrates Henry's blindside while Locky, Tara, and Ziggy are left blindsided. Locky is upset Henry didn't play his idol and feels like he's the next one out. While Tara was left out of the blindside, she is happy to see Henry leave because he was such a dangerous player. All six members of the Champagne Alliance believe they were solely responsible for the Henry blindside. The next day, Ziggy begins to observe that the other eight contestants are made up of pairs (Locky/Tara, Tessa/Peter, Sarah/Michelle, and Jericho/Luke), and she is alone. Ziggy approaches Tessa with a plan to join two pairs into an alliance of five and take Jericho out next as he has a lot of connections. While they talk by the well, Luke spies on them with his spy shack. Luke feels that Tessa is becoming too powerful and lied to him about not working with Ziggy anymore. Due to seeing Tessa scheme with Ziggy, Luke believes that Tessa should leave next. Everyone has been focusing on how to get to the end. Michelle believes that she has a tight foursome alliance with Luke, Jericho, and Sarah. However, Michelle starts to have reservations about Sarah's gameplay due to Sarah trying to be friendly with everyone and creating fake alliances. Michelle believes that she is playing a more straightforward game where her intentions are clear whereas Sarah is more willing to make plans and promises she won't keep. Sarah proposes an all girls' alliance, but Michelle and Ziggy are hesitant. Ziggy states that people can see through Sarah's gameplay and she can not trust anything she says. Michelle worries the day will come when Sarah gets herself into trouble and she won't be able to protect her.: Immunity challenge: The contestants will balance an idol on top of a pole. At regular intervals, they will add another section of pole, making it taller and harder to balance. If they drop their idol, they are out. Last person standing wins Immunity.; Ziggy wins Immunity. Back at camp, there are three main plans discussed. Locky and Tara approach Peter and Tessa with the goal of reuniting old Samatau and voting Sarah out. The Champagne Alliance creates a plan to split their votes between Locky and Tara in case one of them has an idol, with Locky leaving on the revote. And Luke informs Jericho and Sarah that because of all the split votes, if the three of them vote for Tessa, then she will leave. Sarah has some reservations about the plan and realizes she has become the swing vote. Because Tessa took Michelle on the Reward, Luke decides not to tell Michelle about the blindside for fear of Michelle telling Tessa what they are planning. At Tribal, discussion centers on how intensely people are playing the game. However, some like Locky and Ziggy believe it can be better to not get too involved in the scheming as making too many big moves can get you voted out. When asked how many people can still trust someone a hundred percent, everyone except for Jericho and Ziggy say they can. While trust is up for debate, Peter believes the purpose of tonight's vote is to eliminate a huge threat which can mutually benefit a majority of the players still left in the game. When the votes are cast, Locky and Tara voted Sarah, Peter and Ziggy voted for Locky, Tessa and Michelle voted for Sarah, but Luke, Sarah, and Jericho act on their plan to blindside Tessa. With a majority three votes, Tessa becomes the sixteenth person voted out of Australian Survivor and the fourth member of the jury.
71	20	"Survivor Charades"	TBA	25 September 2017
72	21	"Winning Her Over with Some Sweet Lollies"	TBA	26 September 2017
73	22	"Happy Days"	TBA	2 October 2017
74	23	"Conquered"	TBA	3 October 2017
75	24	"Day 50"	TBA	8 October 2017
76	25	"Civilized Scrambling"	TBA	9 October 2017
77	26	"The Wet, the Cold, the Wind, and the Dark"	TBA	10 October 2017
78	27	"Reunion Special"	TBA	10 October 2017

== Voting history ==
Tribal Phase (Day 1–34)

	Original tribes								Tribe swap vote (Note: On Day 20, after voting out one castaway at Tribal Council, Samatau was instructed to immediately vote out another tribe member. Unbeknownst to them, both voted out castaways would be temporarily exiled before joining Asaga. Since no one was eliminated this episode, the contestant's votes were not aired in the closing credits. In exit interviews that have occurred since the airing of this episode, it has been revealed that many details about whom contestants voted for were omitted from the episode due to time constraints. Specifically, the fact that the second vote-off originally resulted in a tie was not even alluded to)				First swap		Reward (Note: On Day 26, the winning tribe attended Tribal Council, voting to give one member of their tribe the power to find the "Ultimate Reward". Samatau won the right, and Ziggy was selected for the reward.)	Second swap		Mutiny (Note: On Day 32, instead of voting out someone at Tribal Council. Asaga was given the offer to mutiny from their tribe and become a member of Samatau. Only the first person to accept the offer would be allowed to mutiny. Peter decided to leave Asaga, becoming a full member of Samatau.)	Post-mutiny
Episode #	1		2	3	4	5	6	7	8				9	10	11	12	13	14	15
Day #	3		6	9	11	13	16	18	20				22	24	26	28	30	32	34
Eliminated	Tie (Note: The Tribal Council vote resulted in a tie. Per the rules, a second vote was held where the castaways involved in the tie would not vote and the remaining castaways could only vote for those who tied.)	Joan	Adam	Kate	Tarzan	Aimee	Sam	Mark	Tie	Tara (Note: Instead of being eliminated from the game, Tara and Anneliese were switched to Asaga. As a result of this twist, Asaga had to choose two tribemates to swap to Samatau. They chose Ben & Henry.)	Tie	Anneliese	Jacqui	Kent	None	A.K.	Ben	Peter	Odette
Votes	6–6	7–3	5–4–2–1	5–4–2	3–1–0 (Note: Tessa played a hidden immunity idol, therefore six votes against her were negated.)	5–4	9–2	7–3	3–3–2	5–1	3–3–1	5–0	6–3	5–2–1	6–1–1	4–2–1	5–3	Accepted	4–1
Voter	Vote																		
Jericho	Kent	Joan					Sam	Jacqui					Jacqui	Kent		A.K.			Odette
Tara			Kate	Tessa	~~Tessa~~	A.K.			A.K.	None (Note: This contestant was only able to vote for one other contestant, thus they were not eligible to vote.)			Jacqui	Kent		A.K.			Odette
Peter			Adam	Kate	Tarzan	Aimee			Locky	Tara	Locky	Anneliese			Ziggy	Tara		Mutinied	
Michelle	Kent	Kent					Sam	Mark					Jacqui	Kent			Ben		
Locky			Adam	Kate	Tarzan	A.K.			A.K.	A.K.	A.K.	None			Ziggy		Michelle		
Ziggy			Anneliese	Tessa	~~Tessa~~	Aimee			Tara	Tara	Anneliese	Anneliese			Peter		Ben		
Luke	Kent	Kent					Sam	Jacqui					Jacqui	Odette		A.K.			Odette
Sarah	Joan	Joan					Sam	Mark					Jacqui	Kent		Peter			Odette
Tessa			Anneliese	Tara	Locky	Aimee			Tara	Tara	Anneliese	Anneliese			Ziggy		Michelle		
Henry	Joan	Joan					Sam	Mark							Locky		Ben		
Anneliese			Kate	Tessa	~~Tessa~~	A.K.			A.K.	Tara	Locky	None	Jacqui	Kent			Ben		
Jarrad			Adam	Kate	Tarzan	Aimee			Tara	Tara	Locky	Anneliese			Ziggy		Ben		
Odette	Kent	Kent					Sam	Mark					Sarah	Michelle		A.K.			Sarah
Ben	Kent	Joan					Sam	Mark							Ziggy		Michelle		
A.K.			Adam	Kate	~~Tessa~~	Aimee			Locky	None	Anneliese	Anneliese			Ziggy	Tara			
Kent	Joan	None					Sam	Mark					Sarah	Michelle					
Jacqui	Joan	Joan					Sam	Mark					Sarah						
Mark	Joan	Joan					Michelle	Jacqui											
Sam	Joan	Joan					Michelle												
Aimee			Adam	Tessa	~~Tessa~~	A.K.													
Tarzan			Anneliese	Kate	~~Tessa~~														
Kate			A.K.	Tara															
Adam			Anneliese																
Joan	Kent	None																	

Individual phase (Day 35–55)

	Merged tribe												
Episode #	16	17	18	19	20	21	22	23	24	25			26
Day #	36	38	40	42	44	46	47	49	50	52			54
Eliminated	Jarrad	Anneliese	Henry	Tessa	Sarah	Luke	Ziggy	Locky	Tessa (Note: On Day 50, for winning the special reward challenge, Jericho earned the power to eliminate one of the first eight jurors. He chose Tessa.)	Tie	Tie (Note: The second Tribal Council vote also resulted in a tie. As there were only four castaways remaining, the two tied castaways would compete in a fire making challenge to resolve the tie.)	Michelle	Peter
Vote	7–5	8–3 (Note: Anneliese played a hidden immunity idol on herself, but Ziggy played an idol nullifier on her, therefore the effects of her idol were negated and the eight votes against her were still counted.)	6–4	3–2–2–2	7–1	5–2	4–2	3–2	Sole Vote	2–2	1–1	Challenge	1–0
Voter	Vote												
Jericho	Jarrad	Anneliese	Henry	Tessa	Sarah	Ziggy	Ziggy	Locky	Tessa	Michelle	None	Win (Note: Michelle lost to Jericho in the fire-making tiebreaker.)	Peter
Tara	Jarrad	Anneliese	Peter	Sarah	Sarah	Luke	Ziggy	Locky		Michelle	Michelle		None
Peter	Luke	Locky	Henry	Locky	Sarah	Luke	Ziggy	Locky		Jericho	Jericho		None
Michelle	Jarrad	Anneliese	Henry	Tara	Sarah	Luke	Ziggy	Peter		Jericho	None	Lose	
Locky	Jarrad	Anneliese	Peter	Sarah	Sarah	Luke	Michelle	Peter					
Ziggy	Luke	Anneliese	Peter	Locky	Sarah	Luke	Michelle						
Luke	Jarrad	Anneliese	Henry	Tessa	Sarah	Ziggy							
Sarah	Jarrad	Anneliese	Henry	Tessa	Michelle								
Tessa	Luke	Locky	Henry	Tara									
Henry	Jarrad	Anneliese	Peter										
Anneliese	Luke	Locky											
Jarrad	Luke												

Final vote
Episode #	26	
Day #	55	
Finalist	Jericho	Tara
Vote	6–3	
Juror	Vote	
Peter		Tara
Michelle	Jericho	
Locky		Tara
Ziggy	Jericho	
Luke	Jericho	
Sarah		Tara
Tessa	None (Note: On Day 50, for winning the special reward challenge, Jericho earned the power to eliminate one of the first eight jurors. He chose Tessa.)	
Henry	Jericho	
Anneliese	Jericho	
Jarrad	Jericho	

== Reception ==
=== Ratings ===
Ratings data is from OzTAM and represents the viewership from the 5 largest Australian metropolitan centres (Sydney, Melbourne, Brisbane, Perth and Adelaide).

Wk	Ep	Air date	Timeslot	Overnight ratings		Consolidated ratings		Total ratings		Source
Wk	Ep	Air date	Timeslot	Viewers	Rank	Viewers	Rank	Viewers	Rank	Source
1	1	30 July 2017	Sunday 7:30pm	639,000	8	52,000	7	691,000	8	
1	2	31 July 2017	Monday 7:30pm	656,000	12	74,000	3	730,000	11	
1	3	1 August 2017	Tuesday 7:30pm	600,000	11	124,000	1	724,000	10	
2	4	6 August 2017	Sunday 7:30pm	606,000	9	51,000	5	657,000	8	
2	5	7 August 2017	Monday 7:30pm	637,000	13	105,000	3	742,000	10	
3	6	13 August 2017	Sunday 7:30pm	622,000	7	72,000	1	694,000	7	
3	7	14 August 2017	Monday 7:30pm	625,000	14	109,000	2	729,000	11	
4	8	20 August 2017	Sunday 7:30pm	633,000	8	63,000	3	696,000	8	
4	9	21 August 2017	Monday 7:30pm	611,000	16	128,000	1	739,000	12	
5	10	27 August 2017	Sunday 7:30pm	607,000	11	55,000	6	662,000	9	
5	11	28 August 2017	Monday 7:30pm	575,000	14	115,000	1	690,000	11	
6	12	3 September 2017	Sunday 7:30pm	574,000	9	49,000	4	623,000	8	
6	13	4 September 2017	Monday 7:30pm	617,000	14	88,000	2	706,000	11	
7	14	10 September 2017	Sunday 7:30pm	603,000	8	55,000	2	658,000	8	
7	15	11 September 2017	Monday 7:30pm	595,000	17	101,000	2	696,000	13	
8	16	17 September 2017	Sunday 7:30pm	567,000	10	54,000	4	622,000	9	
8	17	18 September 2017	Monday 7:30pm	559,000	18	64,000	5	623,000	17	
8	18	19 September 2017	Tuesday 7:30pm	567,000	13	96,000	2	663,000	11	
9	19	24 September 2017	Sunday 7:30pm	570,000	9	69,000	4	639,000	9	
9	20	25 September 2017	Monday 7:30pm	625,000	12	68,000	3	693,000	11	
9	21	26 September 2017	Tuesday 7:30pm	625,000	10	94,000	2	719,000	10	
10	22	2 October 2017	Monday 7:30pm	617,000	15	43,000	5	660,000	14	
10	23	3 October 2017	Tuesday 7:30pm	595,000	11	90,000	2	685,000	11	
11	24	8 October 2017	Sunday 7:30pm	644,000	14	68,000	5	712,000	11	
11	25	9 October 2017	Monday 7:30pm	669,000	10	51,000	4	721,000	10	
11	26 (Note: The final episode was coded into two programs - the first titled "Grand Finale" and the second titled "Winner Announced". Because of this, two separate sets of ratings were produced.)	10 October 2017	Tuesday 7:30pm	720,000	9	105,000	3	825,000	8	
11	26	10 October 2017	Tuesday 7:30pm	787,000	7	155,000	2	943,000	2	
11	R (Note: These ratings account for the "Reunion" episode which aired after the finale.)	10 October 2017	Tuesday 7:30pm	508,000	16	105,000	3	613,000	13	
