= St George's College, Perth =

Oldest residential college within the University of Western Australia

St George's College
- University of Western Australia
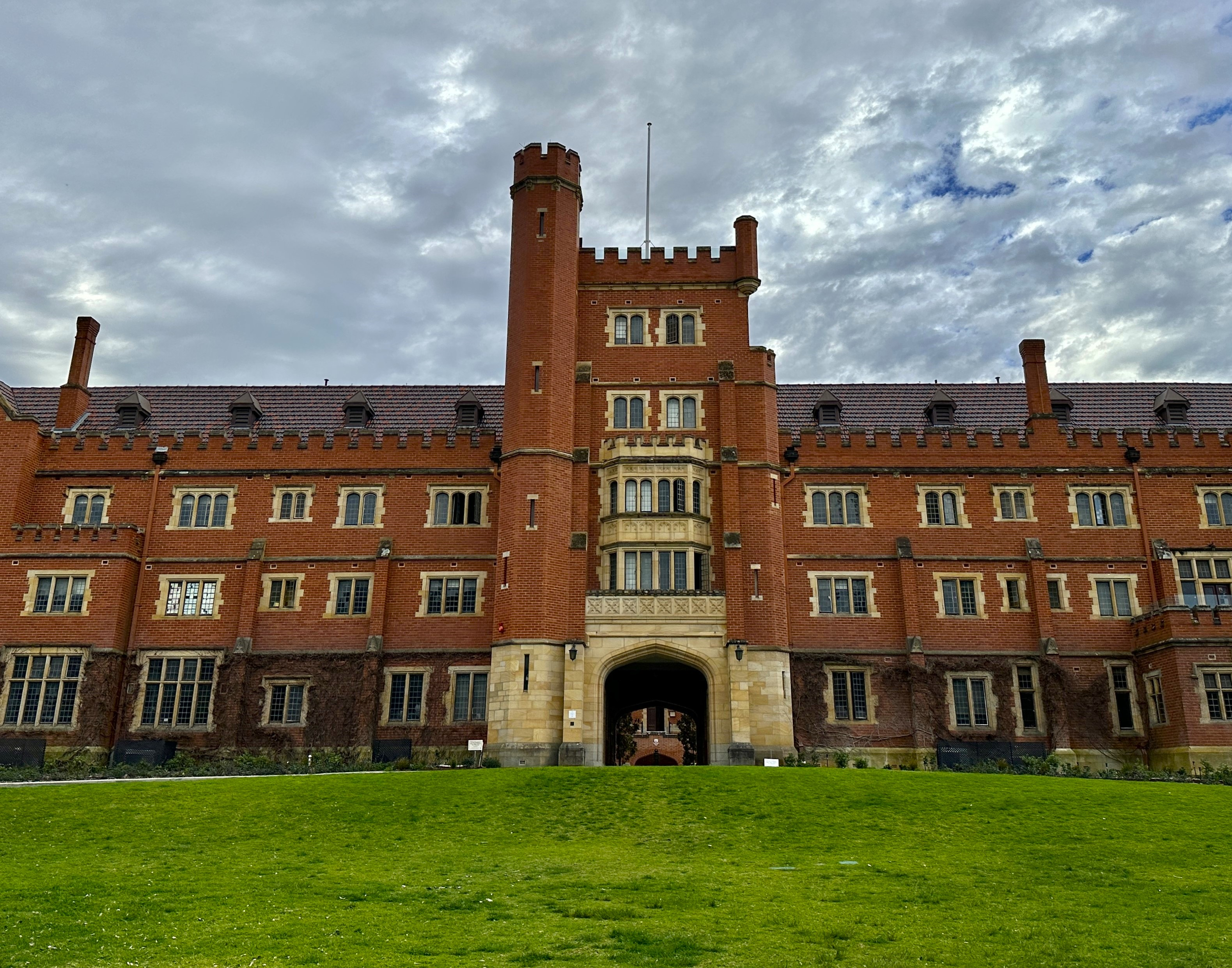
- The College, pictured in 2023

- The current rendering of the College's coat of arms
- Coordinates: 31°58′26″S 115°49′18″E
- Abbreviation: STGC
- Nickname: George's
- Motto: Nosse Deum Vivere (Latin)
- Motto in English: To know God is to live
- Established: 1931
- Named for: St George
- Architect: Hobbs, Smith and Forbes (Original buildings); Hobbs Winning and Leighton (1962 and 1968 additions); Palassis Architects (2010 additions); Whitehaus (2019 addition)
- Architectural style: Interwar Gothic (original buildings)
- Colours: Red; White
- Gender: Co-educational
- Warden: Neil Walker
- Chairman: David Horn
- Chaplain: Ven. Peter Boyland
- Residents: c. 270
- Website: Official website

Register of the National Estate
- Type: Historic
- Designated: 21 October 1980 (gardens); 28 September 1982 (buildings)
- Reference no.: 10355 (gardens); 10360 (buildings)

St George's College is a residential college within the University of Western Australia. Created through a bequest of Sir John Winthrop Hackett and the subsequent collaboration of the university and the Anglican Diocese of Perth, it opened in 1931, making it the oldest college within the university. Initially male-only, the College became co-educational in 1981. It is recognised for its architectural significance and appears on several heritage listings.

== History ==
The first chancellor of the University of Western Australia (UWA), Sir John Winthrop Hackett, died in 1916. In his will, Hackett made the Anglican Diocese of Perth a residuary legatee, for the purpose of establishing a church college at UWA, with a chapel if possible. Upon the sale of Hackett's shares in The West Australian and The Western Mail in 1926, they ultimately received A£138,285. These funds were used to establish the College, largely the result of efforts of Archbishop Charles Riley, who secured the land for the College from the UWA senate in 1923. However, the senate was found not to have the necessary powers to allocate the land, a situation which required the University Colleges Act 1926 (WA) to be passed. Aside from the provision of land, the university made no contribution to the initial construction of the College. The architectural firm of Sir Talbot Hobbs, E.H. Dean-Smith, and W.J. Forbes was engaged to design the College. Hobbs later became a member of the College Council, and donated its billiards table.

The foundation stones of the College and the College Chapel were each laid on 8 March 1928 by Sir William Campion (Governor of Western Australia) and Riley, respectively. The College was officially opened on 23 April 1931 (Saint George's Day), although the Chapel had not yet been completed. The Chief Justice of Western Australia, Sir Robert McMillan, died at the opening of the College having just delivered his speech. The College catered for 24 men in its first year of operation. It appears that both Riley and Archbishop Henry Le Fanu (who succeeded Riley upon his death in 1929) intended for St George's to serve as a theological college and host seminarians, although this was not possible under the conditions of the University Colleges Act, and St George's never taught theology classes. Despite its close relationship with the Anglican Church, the College was open to students of any denomination or religion from its founding.

In one noted incident in 1949, all 74 residents of the College conspired to hoax the university by presenting a lecture on Modern Sculpture—is it a Hoax? from "M. Jean Leps", supposedly an avant-garde sculptor. Leps was, in fact, a resident of the College, and drew an audience of 450–500 people who largely praised his speech.

The Joint Colleges Appeal in 1959 raised funds for the expansion of the UWA colleges. The south wing was opened in 1962, and the north wing in 1968; both were designed by Hobbs Winning and Leighton.

The College became co-educational in 1981 after 50 years of being male-only.

Memorial Wing opened in 2007, commemorating 14 members of the College who died in service in the Second World War and which replaced the memorial squash courts constructed in 1958. Newby Wing opened in 2010 alongside new maintenance and kitchen facilities, and that same year the College sustained significant damage in the 2010 Western Australian storms. The chapel was restored in 2012. Rodgers Wing opened in 2019, designed by Whitehaus.

The College drew some attention in 2019 over plans to host a summer school in collaboration with the controversial Ramsay Centre for Western Civilisation, which did not eventuate.

== Architecture, buildings, and gardens ==
The architecture of the original wing of the College and Chapel is described as Interwar Gothic, or alternatively Tudor Gothic. The College was constructed from red brick with Donnybrook stone dressings. The façade of the College is closely modelled on the façade of the Old Court at Selwyn College. The original wing encloses on three sides a grass quadrangle, which significantly differs from most Oxbridge-style quadrangles in that the three built sides feature deep cloisters at the ground and first floor levels to provide horizontal connection and reduce the impact of the summer heat.

Rodgers Wing won the 2020 Master Builders-Bankwest Excellence in Construction Award for projects in the range of A$10–20 million.

=== Chapel ===
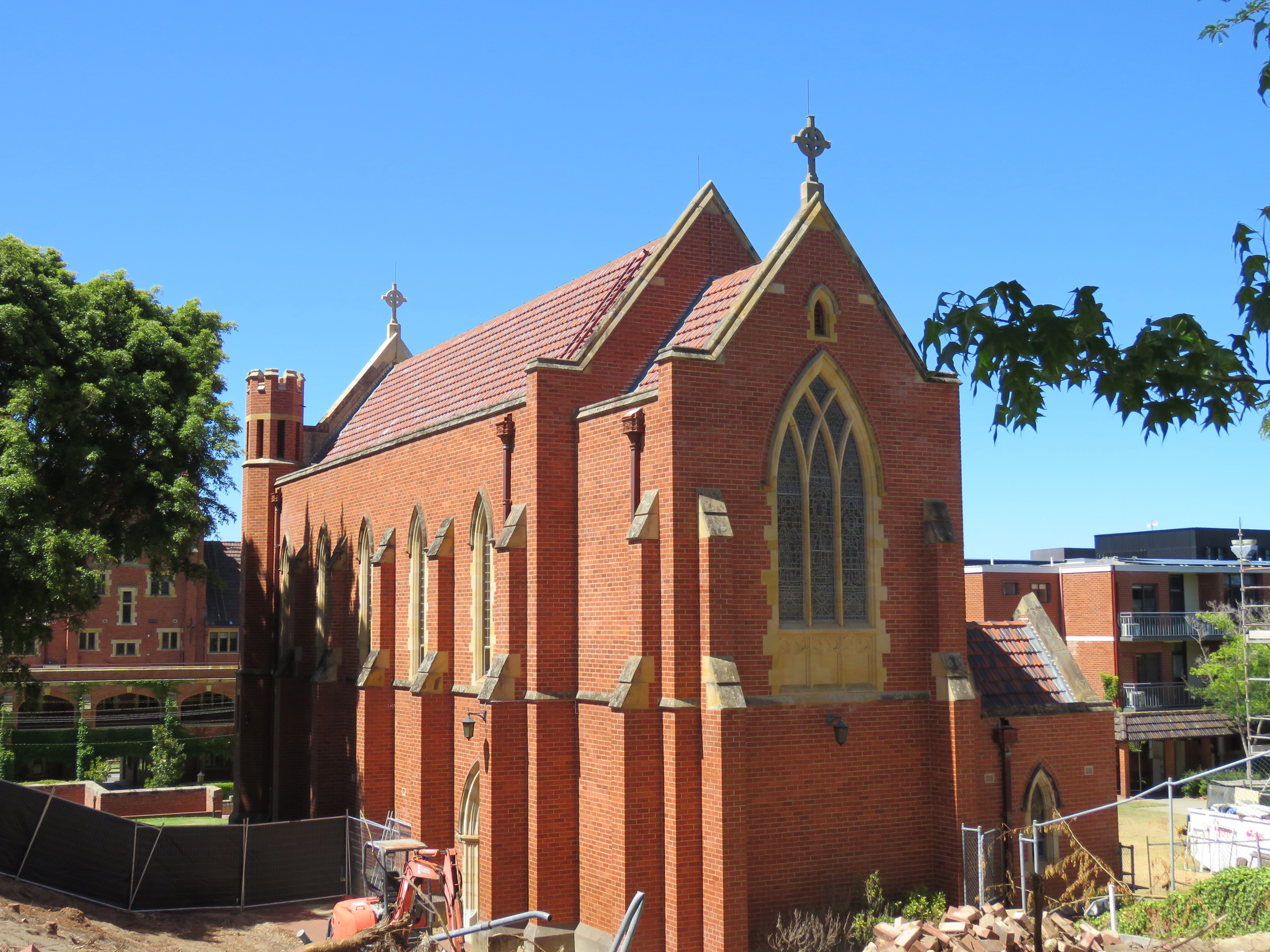
The College Chapel, viewed from the north. Pictured during landscape renovation in 2021.

The College Chapel is aligned on a north-south axis and is entered from the south, rather than the traditional east-west axis. The seating in the nave is arranged in collegiate style with pews facing inwards to each other rather than towards the altar. A similar arrangement is commonly found in the chancel of Gothic churches to provide for a smaller collegial group of worshippers. The College Chapel expanded this format as the College population is collegial as a whole, removing the need for a separate congregation. The pipe organ in its southern loft was newly built as part of the original Chapel construction by Josiah Eustace Dodd and features jarrah casings.

The south façade features the five blazons of the Anglican diocese in which Crawley has been located: (from left to right) Canterbury, Calcutta, Sydney, Adelaide, and Perth. The south windows feature (from left to right) Bishop William Broughton, Aidan of Lindisfarne, Augustine of Canterbury, Saint Boniface, and Riley. The north windows above the altar feature (from left to right) Saint George, Jesus, and Paul the Apostle.

=== Heritage status ===
The College gardens were listed on the Register of the National Estate on 21 October 1980, with the rest of the College added on 28 September 1982. The College was added to the National Trust on 2 April 1979, and the City of Perth Heritage List on 20 December 1985.

== College crest ==
The College arms were granted by the Garter Principal King of Arms on 5 March 1964, confirming arms used from foundation. The arms include black swans (indicating its location and proximity to the Swan River), a double-headed eagle (drawn from the Hackett family crest in tribute to its founder), and the Cross of St George. The motto is drawn from the Second Collect at Morning Prayer.

== Wardens ==
No.	Warden	Term start	Term end	Ref.
1	Rev. Can. Percy Henn	1931	1932	
2	Rev. Can. Charles Law	1932	1940	
3	John Heywood Reynolds MBE	1940	1971	
4	Peter Simpson OAM	1971	1979	
5	Ben Darbyshire	1980	2006	
6	John Inverarity AM MBE	2006	2011	
7	Ian Hardy	2012	2024	
8	Neil Walker	2025	incumbent	

== Notable alumni ==
=== Academia ===
- Ken Freeman AC FAA FRS – astronomer
- Bob Hodge – linguist
- Robert Ridge – geologist, botanist, cell and molecular biologist
- Barry Ninham AO FAA – physicist and mathematician
- Richard Pestell AO FRACP – oncologist and endocrinologist
- Maike Osborne - machine learning

=== Arts ===
- Peter Bladen – poet
- Geoffrey Drake-Brockman – artist
- Irwin Lewis – artist
- Maxwell Newton – publisher
- Jarrad Seng – photographer and filmmaker
- Randolph Stow – author

=== Business ===
- Sir Rod Eddington AO FTSE – businessman
- Richard Goyder AO – businessman
- Kevin Cullen AM – doctor and winemaker

=== Law ===
- Sir Francis Burt AC KCMG QC – jurist
- David Malcolm AC QC – judge
- Christopher Pullin KC – judge

=== Politics and the public service ===
- Harvey Barnett AO – intelligence officer
- Holger Becker – politician
- Mel Bungey – politician
- Alan Carpenter – politician
- Arnold Cook – economist
- John Day – politician
- Peter Dowding SC – politician
- Alan Eggleston – politician
- Peter Foss KC – politician
- Sir Gordon Freeth KBE – politician and diplomat
- Philip Gardiner – politician
- Bruce Haigh – diplomat
- David Irvine AO – diplomat
- Graham Jacobs – politician
- Ern Manea AO – mayor and doctor
- Bill Marmion – politician
- Ian Medcalf AO ED QC – politician
- Ian Osborne – politician
- Eric Ripper AM – politician
- David Scaife – politician
- John Stone AO – public servant and politician
- Douglas Sturkey CVO AM – diplomat
- Daryl Williams AM KC – politician
- Sir John Yocklunn KCVO – public servant

=== Religion ===
- Bishop Bruce Rosier AM – Anglican bishop
- Bishop Jonathan Holland – Anglican bishop, Queensland

=== Sports ===
- Simon Beasley – Australian rules footballer
- David Dickson – Australian swimmer
- Ken MacLeay – cricketer
- Colin Penter - cricketer
