= Jarrad Seng =

Australian photographer and filmmaker (born 1988)

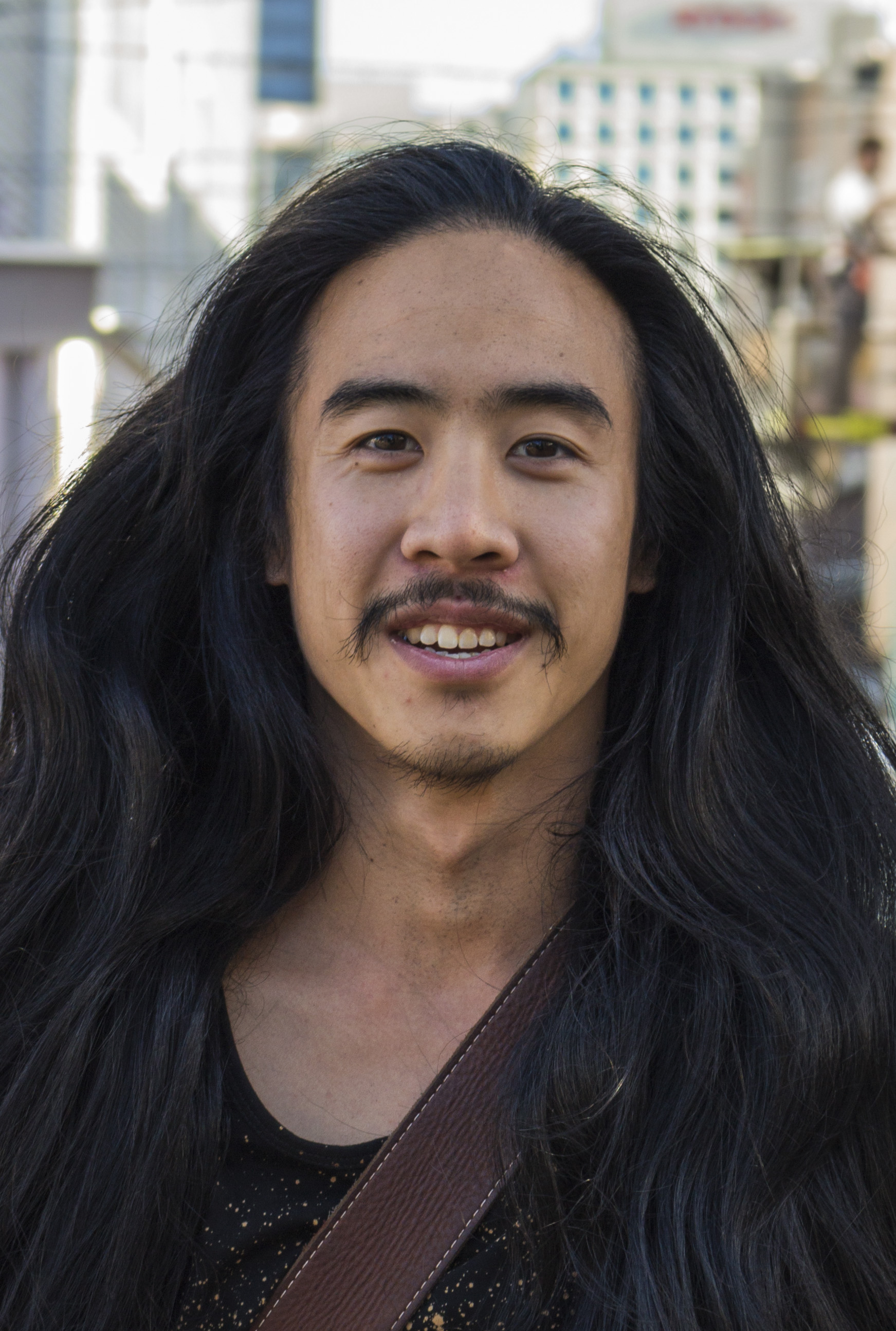
- Seng in April 2015
- Born: 2 February 1988 (age 38); Newman, Western Australia, Australia
- Occupations: Photographer, filmmaker
- Years active: 2009–present

Jarrad Seng (born 2 February 1988) is an Australian photographer and filmmaker. Based in Perth, his work often mixes with his interests in music, travel and volunteering. Seng frequently collaborates with English singer Passenger, serving as his tour photographer on seven tours between 2012 and 2015, as well as directing many of his music videos. Seng has also toured with American band Matchbox Twenty and Australian folk singer Stu Larsen.

His personal photographic work has seen him traveling to both Tanzania and Iceland twice. Seng has held four solo exhibitions — Portraits of Tanzania (2011), Alltervatn (2013), Spirit of the Masaai (2014) and The Space Between (2015) — and a collaborative exhibition, Parallels (2016), with Perth-based artist Amok Island.

Seng received international media coverage in December 2014 after a prank video, in which he walked around a music festival disguised as American DJ Steve Aoki, went viral. In 2013, Seng was a finalist in the Propel Youth Arts Award category at the 2013 WA Youth Awards. Seng competed in season four of Australian Survivor, which began airing in late July 2017.

== Early life ==
Seng was born in the rural Western Australian mining town of Newman. His father, Kim, is Malaysian and his mother, Alice, is a Christmas Islander of Chinese descent. The family moved to Mandurah when Seng was three years old. He attended primary and high school at Frederick Irwin Anglican School, graduating in 2005.

After high school, Seng began studying law at the University of Western Australia (UWA) but found it did not fit his creative nature and soon switched to an arts and commerce degree. From 2008 to 2011, Seng worked in a range of roles at St George's College, the residential college he was living at, including Arts Representative on the College Club Committee, Student Director of Music and as an Arts Tutor in 2011.

== Career ==
Although Seng always had an interest in photography, he never had any formal photography education. Seng began his photography career in 2009 while he was the music editor and writer for Pelican, the UWA student newspaper. While filling in the media accreditation form for the West Coast Blues & Roots Festival, Seng surreptitiously ticked the box for a photographer's pass even though he was only supposed to be there as a writer. Seng borrowed a friend's camera and researched how to take photos on the Internet. The photos turned out decently, leading Seng to buy his own camera and continue pursuing photography.

Seng soon found photography could further his interests in music, travel and volunteering. Seng says he "fell in love with the idea of capturing the beauty of the world on film" while volunteering at a school in Nepal in 2009. In 2009, Seng also started a marketing internship at the Perth International Arts Festival, allowing him to photograph events and begin to get his work noticed.

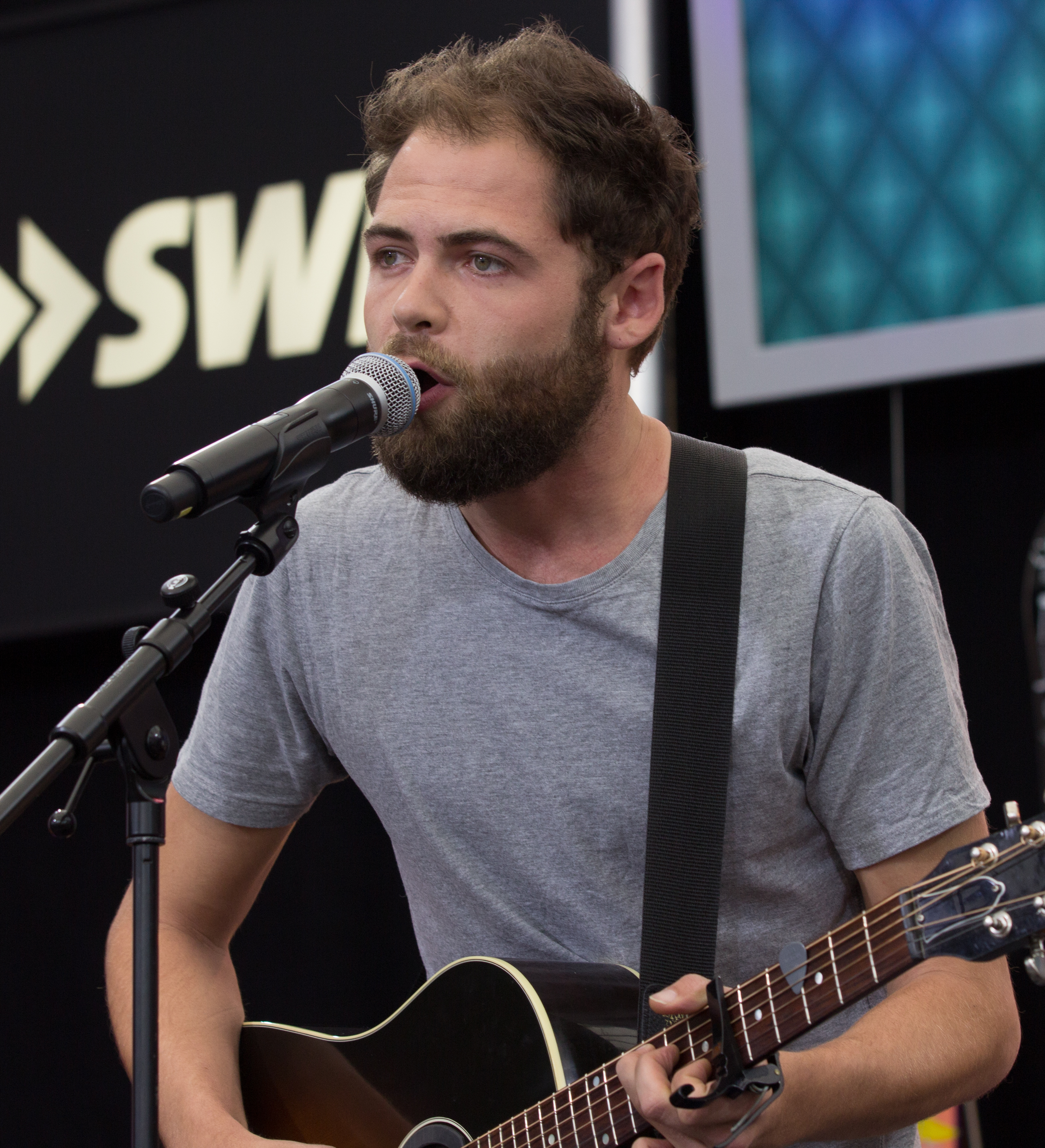
Seng frequently collaborates with English singer Passenger, both as his tour photographer and director of many of his music videos.

Since 2012, Seng has served as a tour photographer for a number of musicians and bands. Seng has been the tour photographer for English singer Passenger on seven tours between 2012 and 2015. In 2013, Seng toured with American rock band Matchbox Twenty on their Australian tour. An ebook, Going North, was released featuring Seng's photographs and written accounts of the tour experience. He also toured with Australian folk singer Stu Larsen on his 2014 European tour.

In addition to music photography, Seng has also directed many music videos for Passenger, as well as music videos for Emma Stevens, Stu Larsen and Patrick James. In October 2014, Seng's photo of an Amity Affliction concert in Perth won the 2014 Monster Children Photo Comp in the music category, winning him $5,000. In April 2015, a short film directed by Seng to promote North Queensland won a competition run by Tropical North Queensland Tourism, winning a $20,000 prize package.

In 2013, Seng was a finalist in the Propel Youth Arts Award category at the 2013 WA Youth Awards. He placed 32nd in the 2017 Australia's Top 50 Influencer Awards. Seng was the subject of an episode of the ABC program On Assignment which was released on ABC iview in September 2015. He was also featured in a video released in March 2017 promoting the Microsoft Surface Book.

=== Photography exhibitions ===
In 2011, Seng travelled to Tanzania to volunteer at a school and orphanage. On the weekends, Seng would visit various villages and photograph candid portraits of the Maasai people. The photographs formed his first solo exhibition, Portraits of Tanzania.

Seng travelled to Iceland in 2012 to take aerial photographs of the country's volcanic river systems. He hired a two-seater plane and photographed out the plane's window. "Every time I wanted to open the window my body disagreed. Opening the window meant pain. It meant a rush of cold air coming in. […] So by the end I had to psych myself up and really pick my moments," Seng said of the experience. The photographs were showcased in 2013 at Seng's second solo exhibition, Alltervatn.

In 2013, Seng returned to Tanzania to help film a short documentary about the orphanage and shoot more portraits, this time focusing on the Maasai children. The portraits were featured in 2014 at Seng's third solo exhibition, Spirit of the Maasai. The documentary, My African Home, won the award for Best Documentary Short at the 2015 Winter Los Angeles Movie Awards. While in Tanzania, Seng also tracked down the Maasai people he had photographed two years earlier and presented them with canvas prints of their earlier selves.

Seng returned to Iceland in 2015 to take a series of self-portraits against the country's landscape. Seng said the portraits explore "the sense of feeling both significant and totally insignificant simultaneously in the presence of nature's grandeur." The series of 12 photos formed his fourth solo exhibition, The Space Between.

In December 2016, together with Perth-based artist Amok Island, Seng held his first collaborative exhibition, Parallels. The exhibition featured Seng's aerial photographs of Rottnest Island's coastline, alongside Amok Island's interpretations of the photos as minimal, geometric paintings.

=== Other projects ===
In the late 2000s Seng played keyboards with the band John and the Inverarities.

Since 2013, Seng has participated in the Perth Fashion Festival's annual Windows of the City competition which sees Perth creatives partnered with a local business to create a store window display. In 2013, Seng worked with artist Annabelle Gordon on a paper cut display for the Sneaky Monkey Cafe at Raine Square. For his 2014 window display for Telstra's Hay Street store, titled Perth24 — A Portrait of the City, Seng spent 24 hours taking 300 portraits of people on the streets of Perth. In 2015, Seng created a photo installation for The Flour Factory, a bar on Queen Street.

In 2014, Seng created The Hidden Sound, a planned series of music gigs where the artist and venue remained secret until the last minute. Australian singer-songwriter Kate Miller-Heidke performed the first gig in August 2014.

Seng received international media coverage in December 2014 after a prank video he uploaded to YouTube and Facebook went viral. The video depicts Seng walking around the Stereosonic music festival in Perth disguised as American DJ Steve Aoki, whom Seng is occasionally mistaken for. Festivalgoers are seen calling out Aoki's name and taking photos with Seng and Seng is shown dancing in the crowd while the real Steve Aoki is performing on stage. Aoki saw the video and the following weekend, at the Melbourne Stereosonic, Seng and Aoki conducted another prank, with Seng dressed up as Aoki and Aoki posing as his photographer.

In May 2015, following earthquakes in Nepal, Seng raised $10,000 for the Australian Red Cross by fulfilling various requests from individuals and businesses over a 24-hour period including taking photos, giving a talk to photography students and streaking through Hay Street in the Perth CBD.

Seng competed in season four of the reality game show Australian Survivor, which was filmed in Samoa and began airing on 30 July 2017. He was the 13th contestant voted out, making it to day 36 and becoming the first member of the jury. Describing his time on the show, Seng said "It was so surreal, to be involved as a player on this show that I've been watching for years and years. It was really great, but it was really brutal as well, and that's what I loved."

== Personal life ==
Since 2015, Seng has been dating Rebecca Williams, a former Miss Universe WA finalist.
