= List of Survivor contestants =

List of Survivor contestants may refer to:

- List of Survivor (American TV series) contestants
- List of Australian Survivor contestants
