= List of Australian Survivor contestants =

Australian Survivor is an Australian reality game show based on the popular international Survivor format. The Contestants are referred to as "castaways", and they compete against one another to become the "Sole Survivor" and win the grand prize of A$500,000 (or an A$100,000 charity prize in the celebrity season).

The series was first aired on the Nine Network in early 2002. Nine did not renew the series. In 2006, the Seven Network picked up the series to produce a celebrity edition known as Celebrity Survivor. Like its predecessor, Seven did not renew the series. In 2015, Network Ten announced that it would air a new season of Australian Survivor which began airing in August 2016. A fourth season aired in 2017 on Ten.

Two seasons of Champions vs. Contenders aired in 2018 and 2019 on Network 10. In 2020, an All Stars season premiered on 3 February 2020, with 24 returning contestants competing for the title of "Sole Survivor" and the cash prize. An eighth season, entitled Brains V Brawn, aired in late 2021 and a ninth season, entitled Blood V Water, aired in early 2022.

Over the course of 14 seasons, a total of 255 people have participated in the program.

== Key legend ==
All information is accurate as of the time the season was filmed, and thus may vary from season to season for returning players.

Table key

^ Contestant played the game for a second time
† Contestant played the game for a third time.
◊ Contestant played the game for a fourth time
o Contestant previously appeared or played on another version of the show
‡ Contestant was withdrawn or was ejected from the game

== Seasons 1–10 (2002–2023) ==
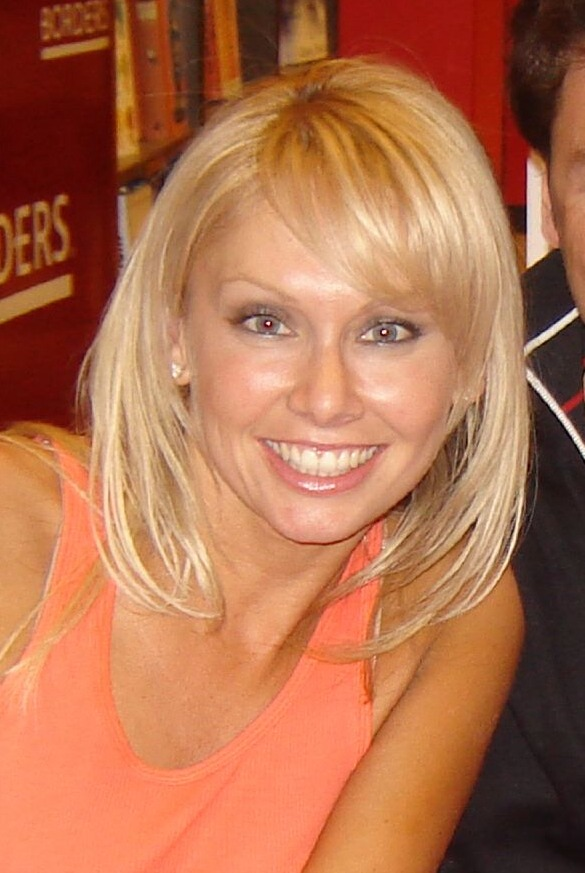
Kym Johnson, Celebrity Survivor: Vanuatu

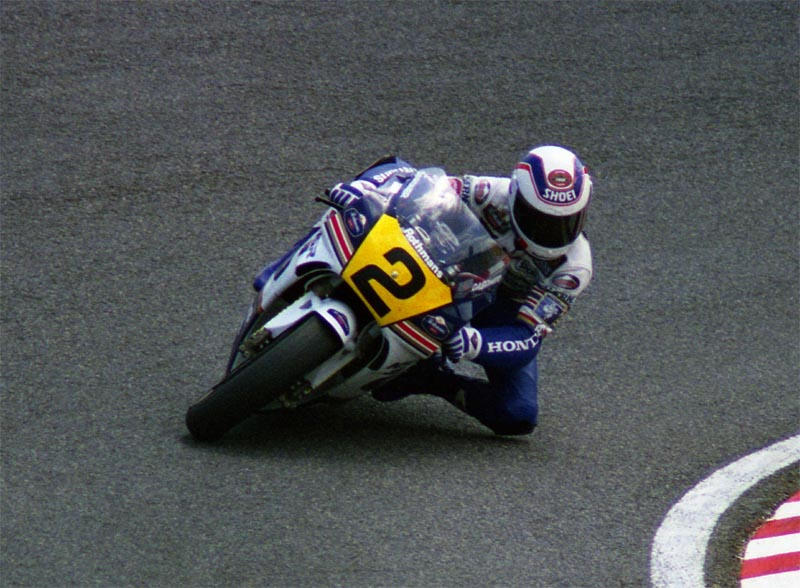
Wayne Gardner, Celebrity Survivor: Vanuatu

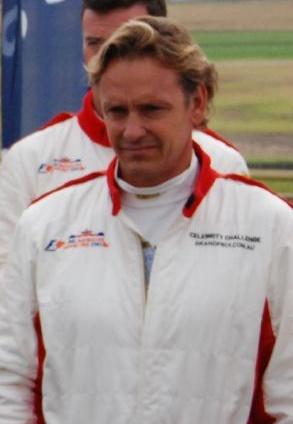
Guy Leech, Celebrity Survivor: Vanuatu

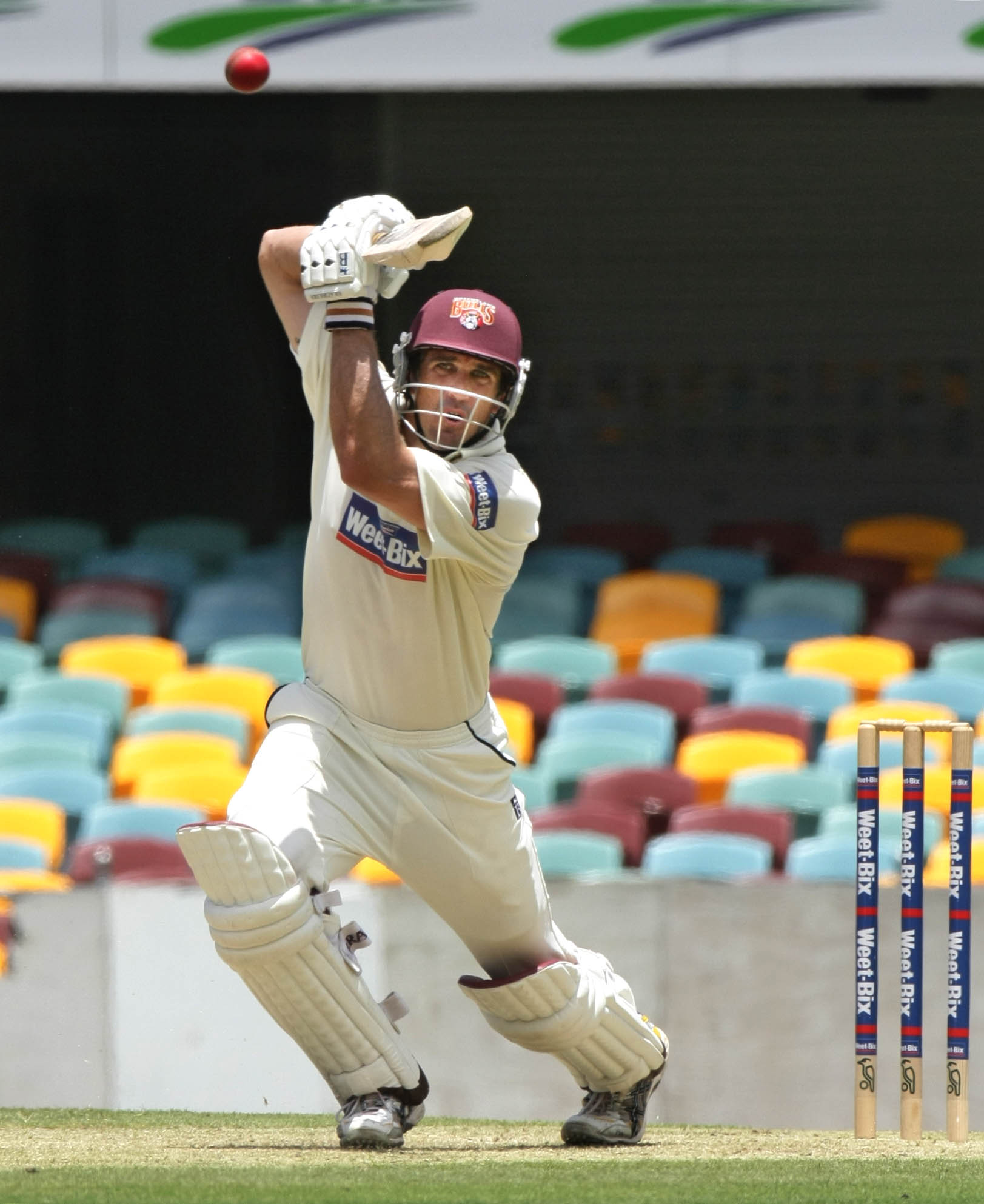
Lee Carseldine, 2016 and All Stars

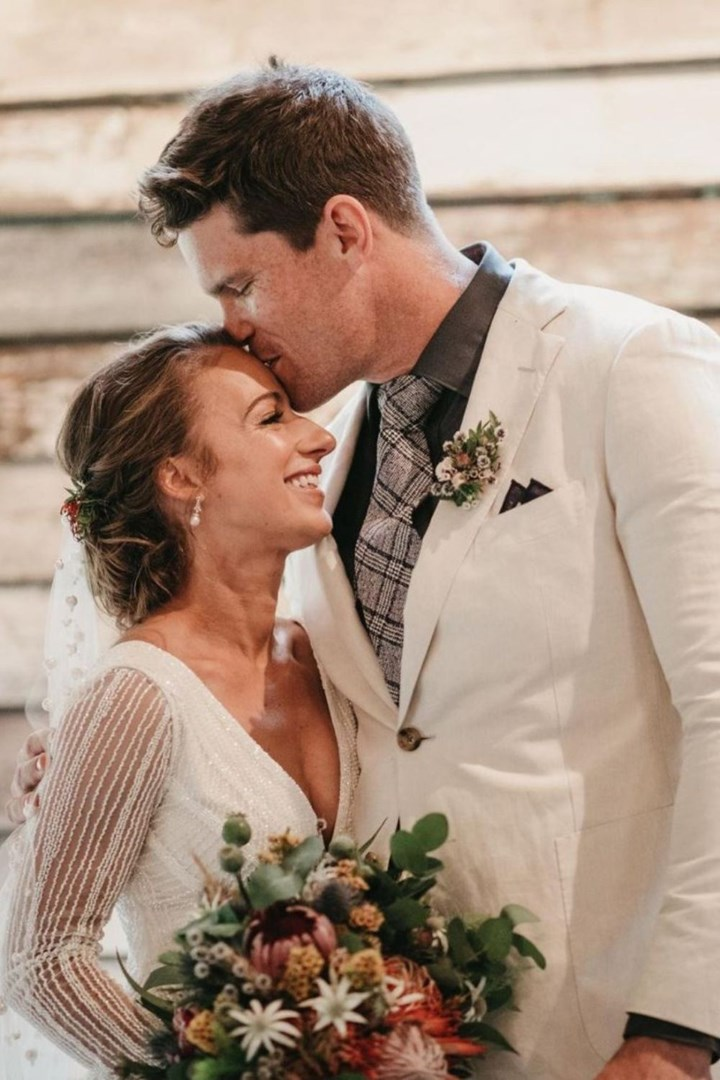
Samantha Gash and Mark Wales, 2017 and Blood V Water

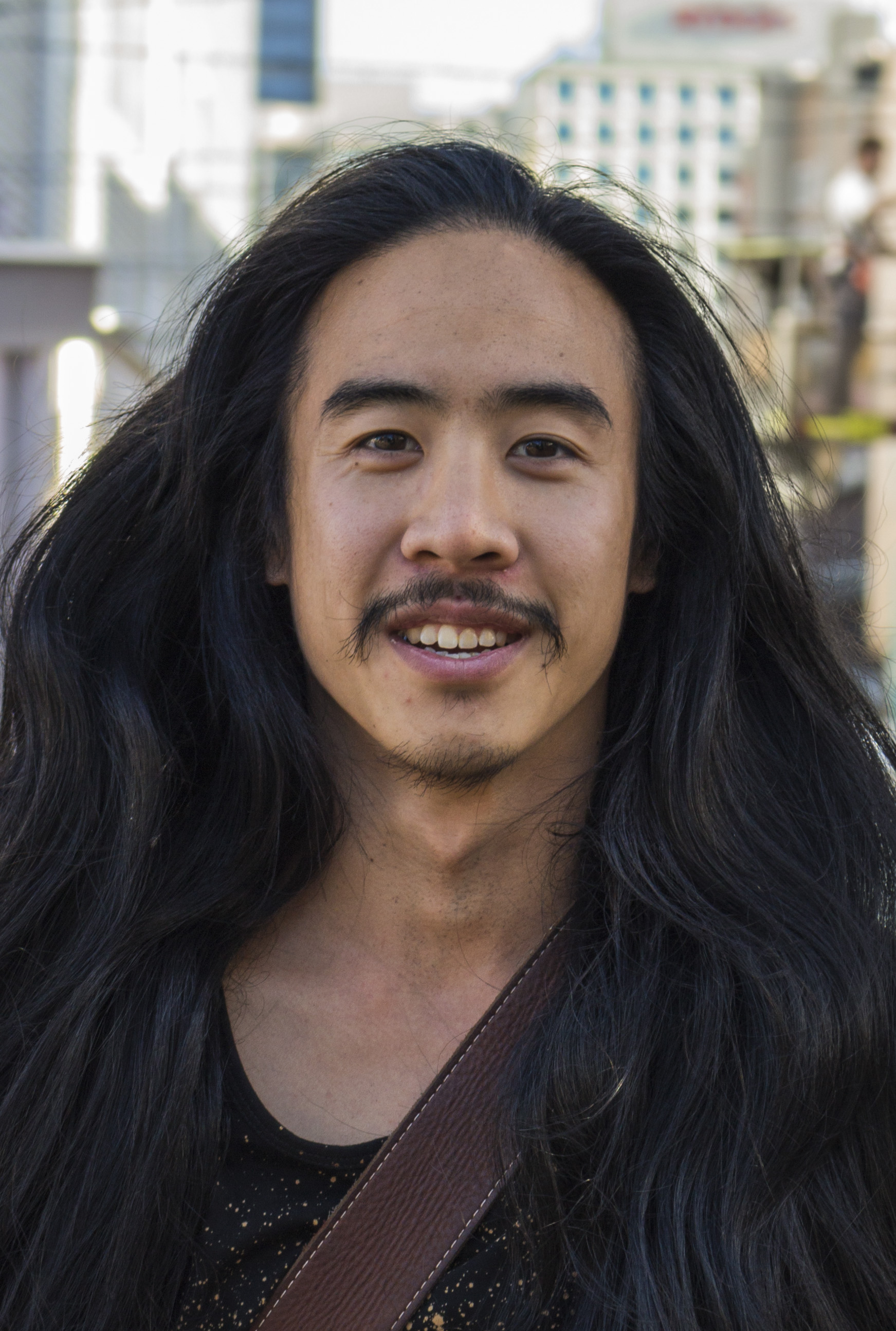
Jarrad Seng, 2017

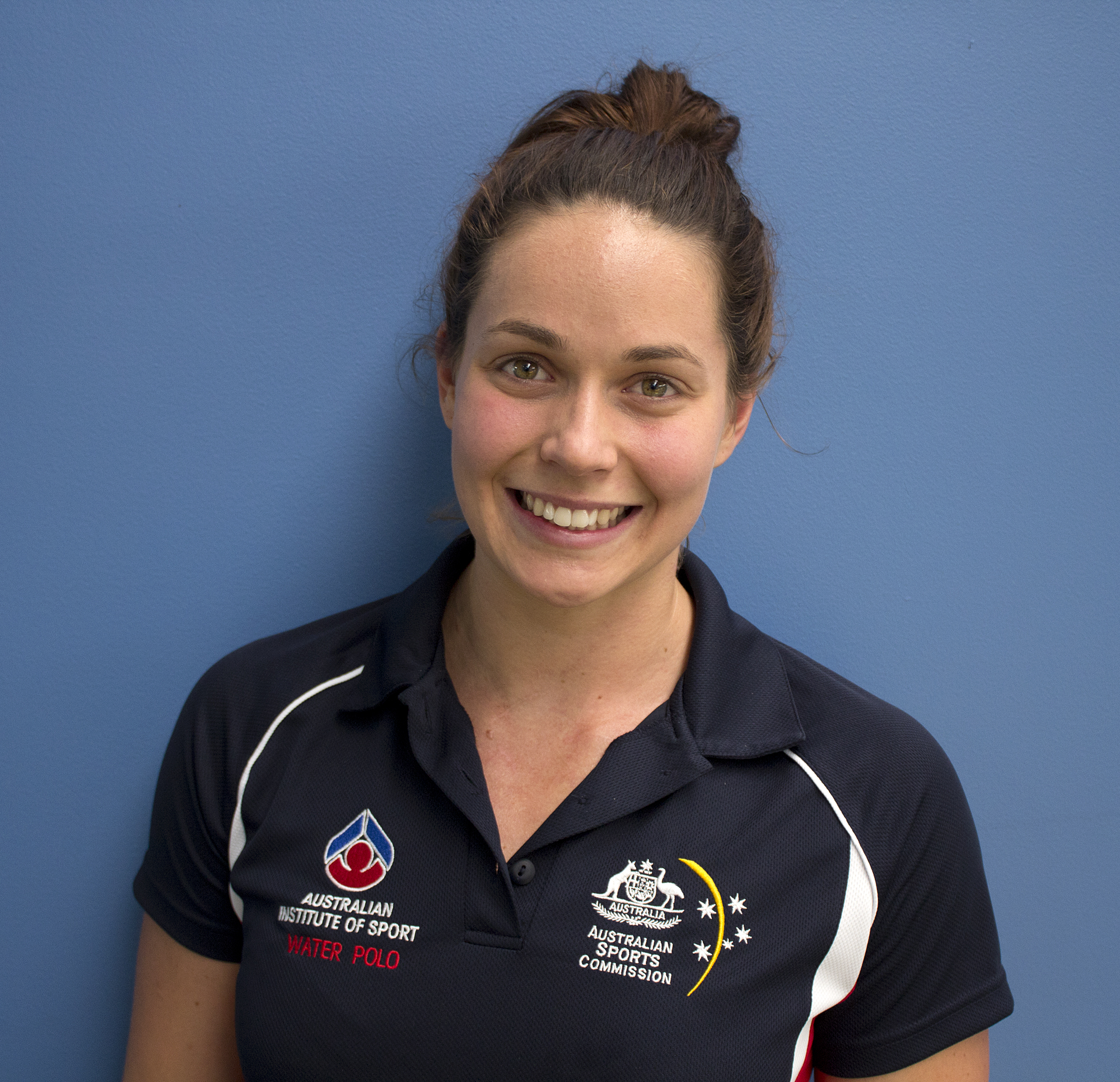
Nicola "Ziggy" Zagame, 2017

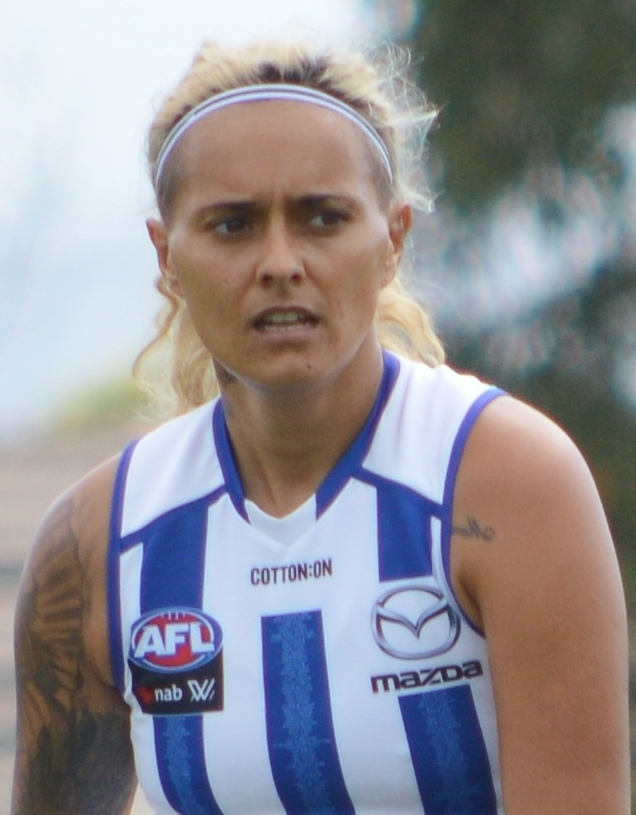
Moana Hope, Champions V Contenders and All Stars

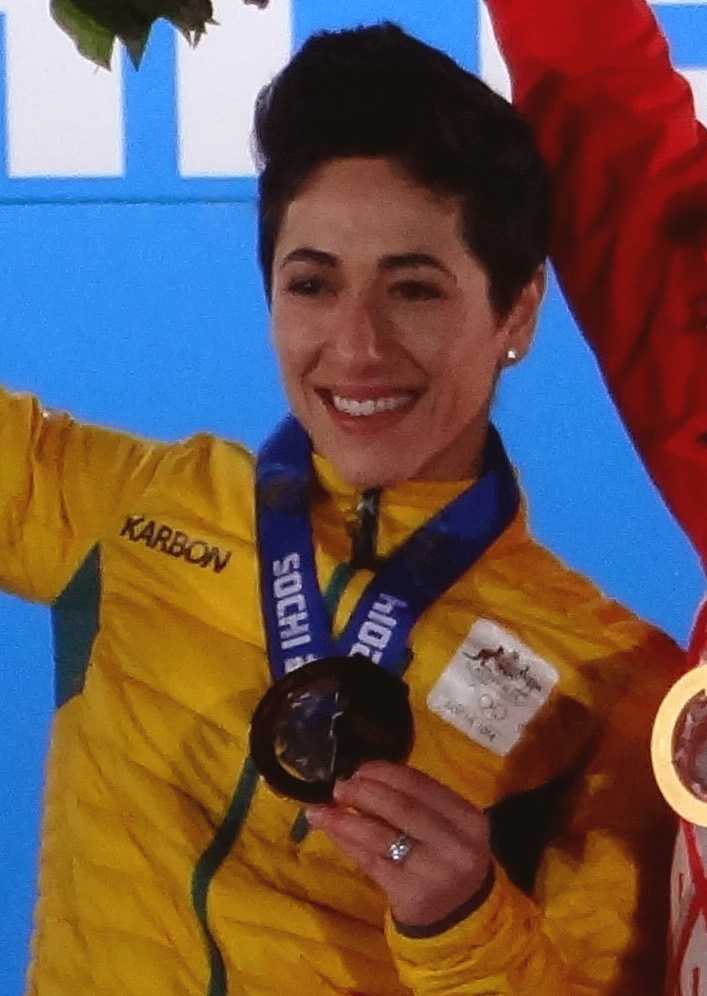
Lydia Lassila, Champions V Contenders and All Stars

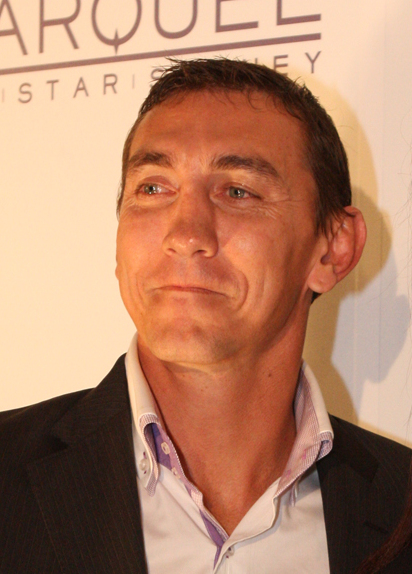
Mat Rogers, Champions V Contenders and All Stars

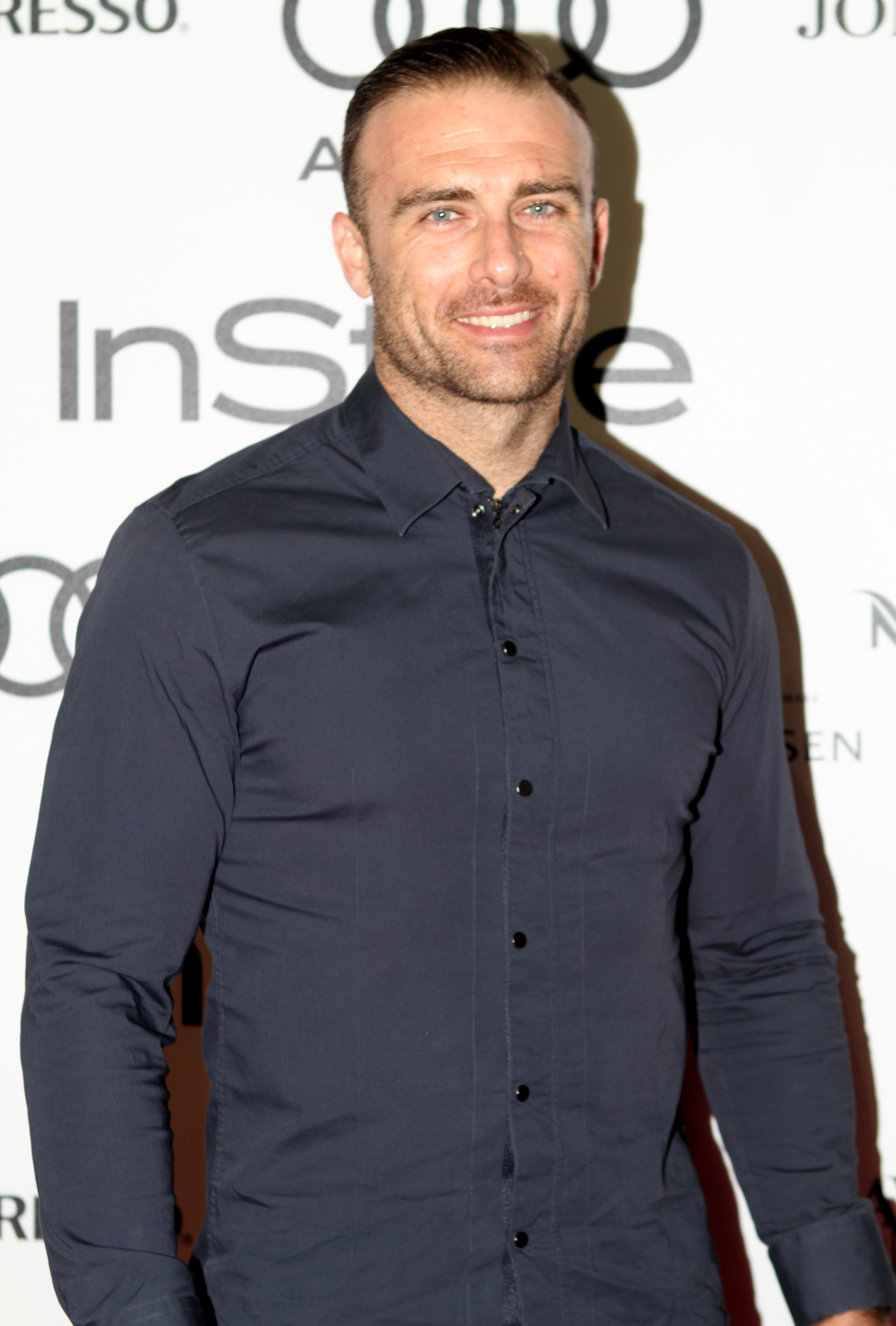
Steve Willis, Champions V Contenders

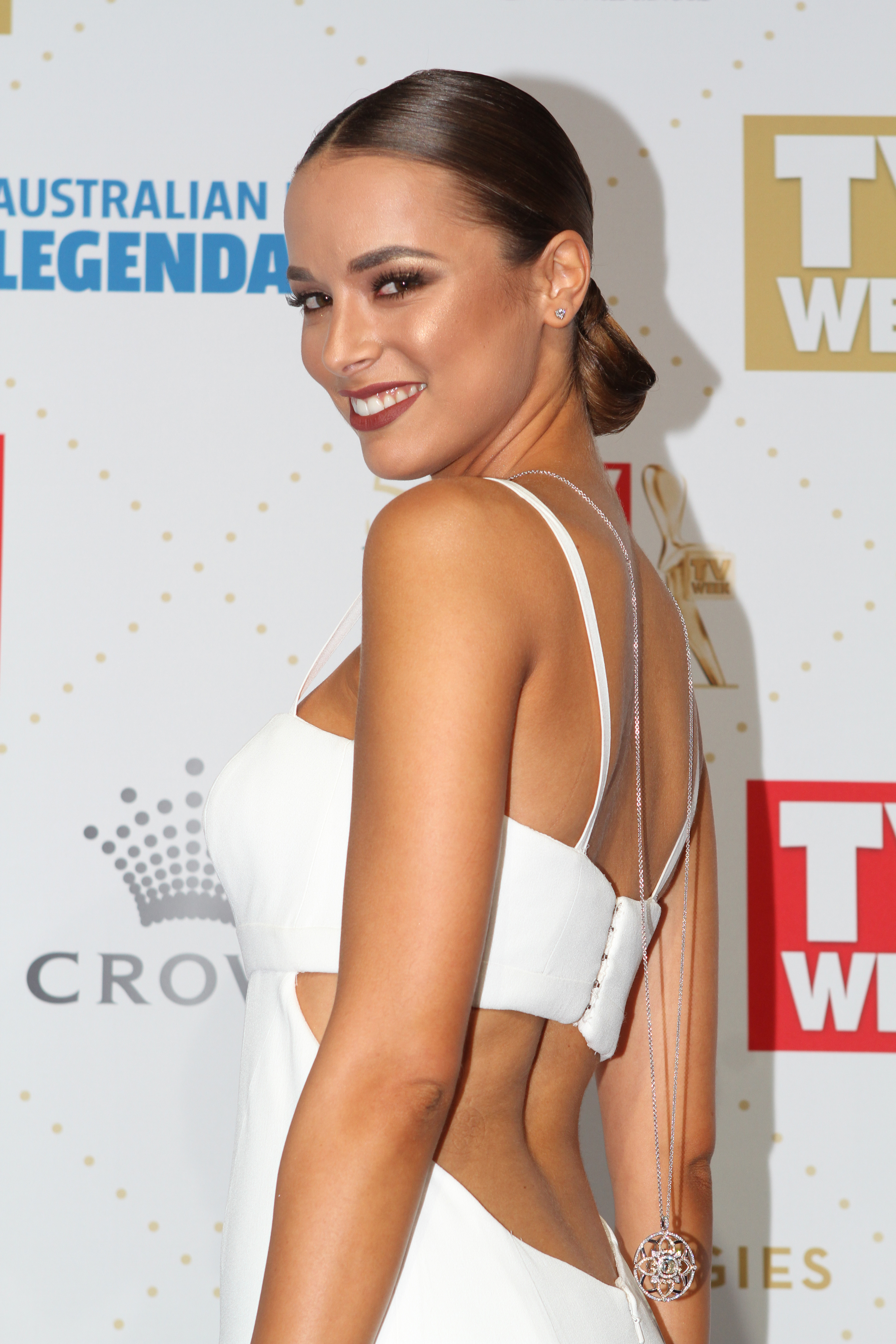
Monika Radulovic, Champions V Contenders

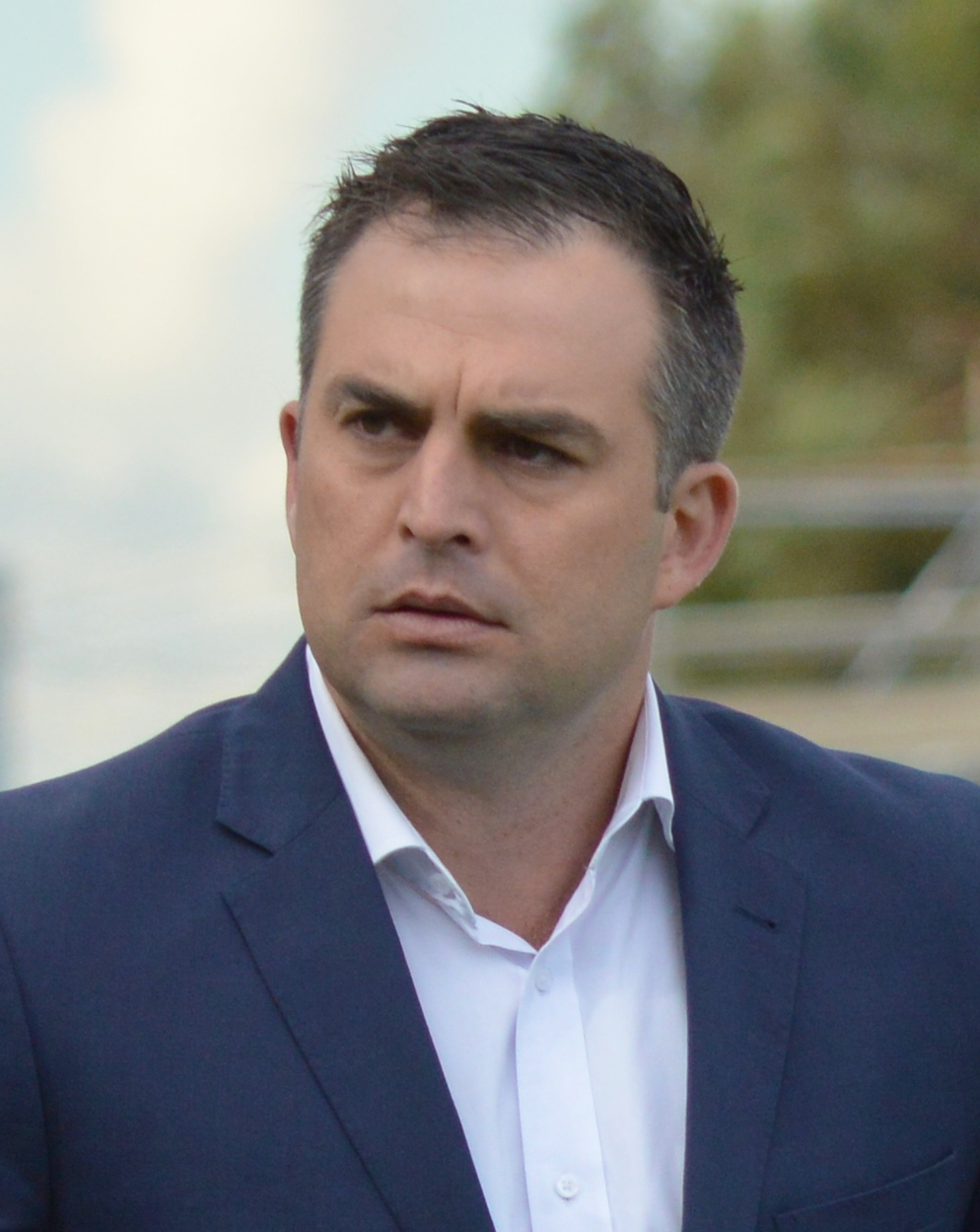
Brian Lake, Champions V Contenders

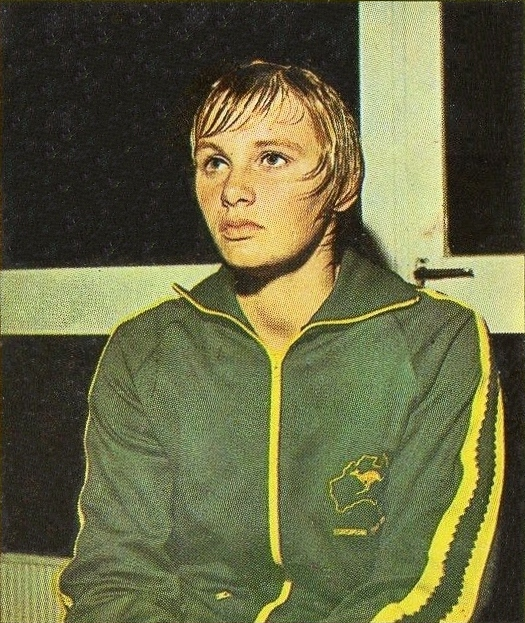
Shane Gould, Australian Survivor: Champions V Contenders and All Stars

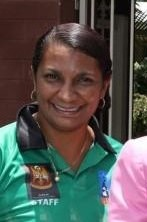
Nova Peris, Champions V Contenders II

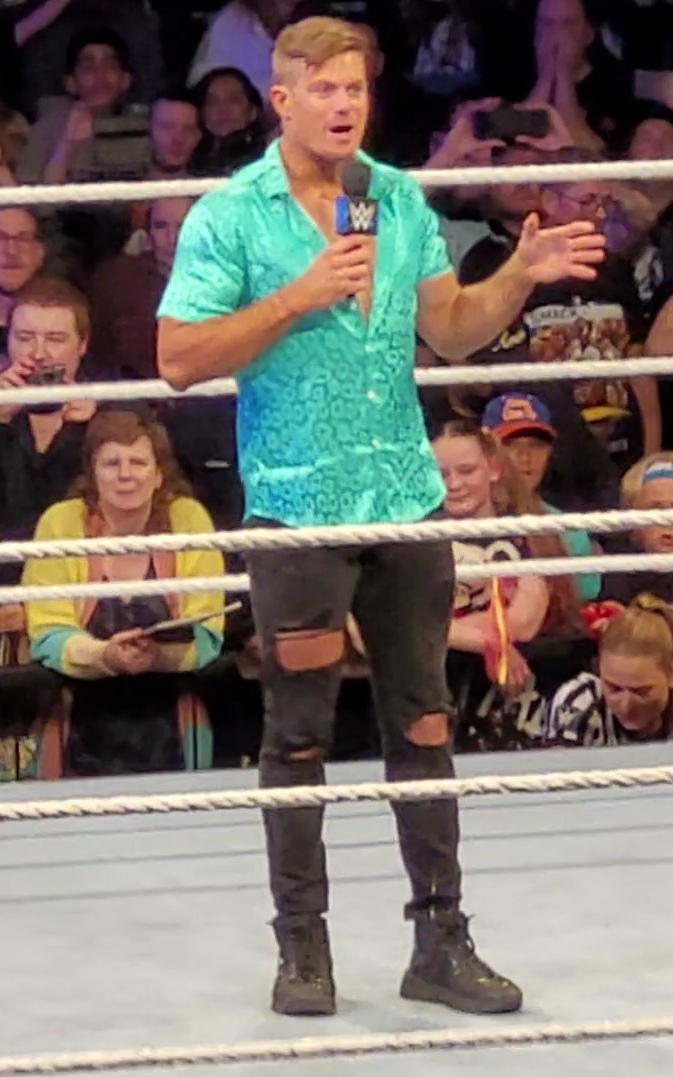
Grayson Waller, Champions V Contenders II

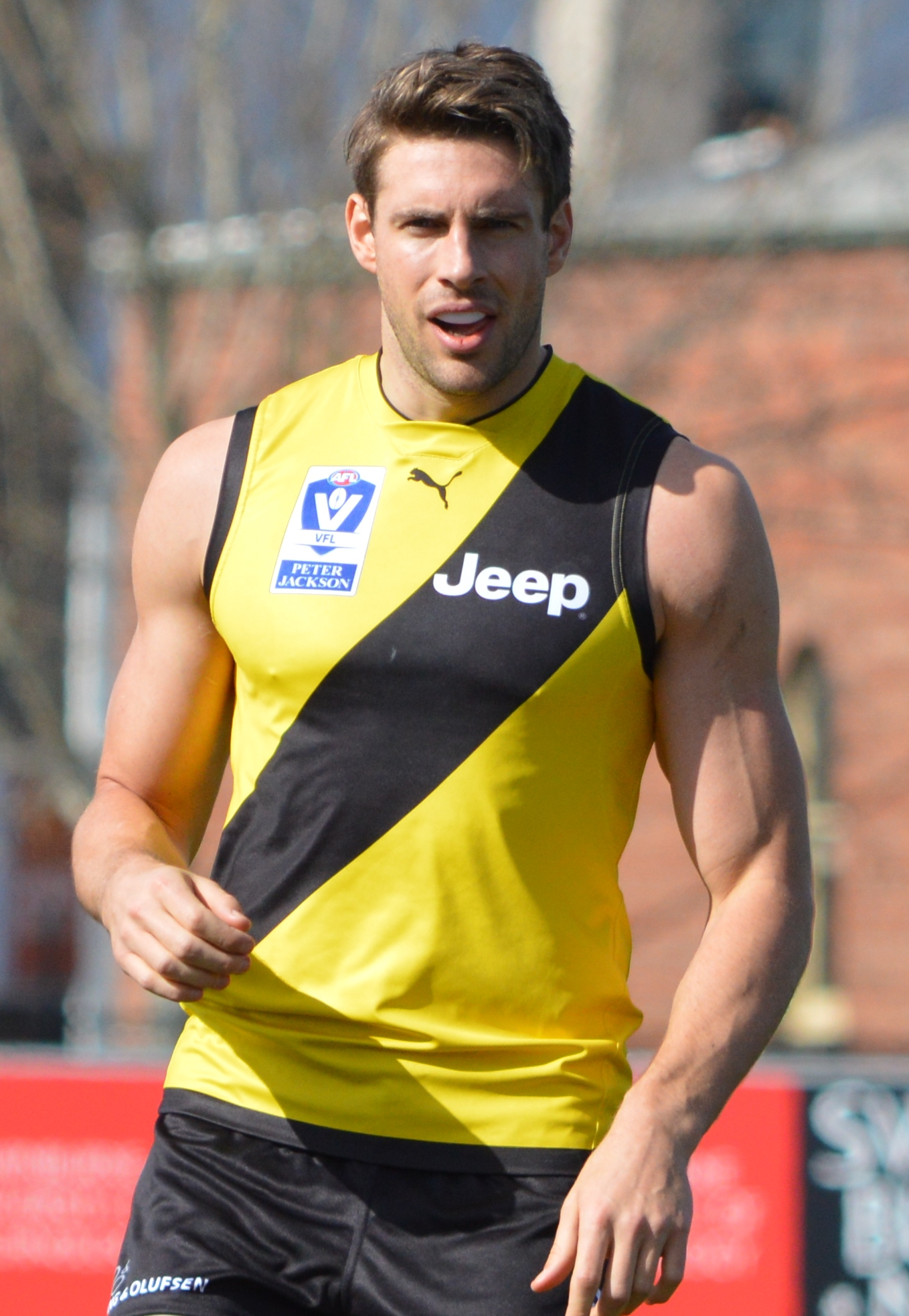
Shaun Hampson, Australian Survivor: Champions V Contenders II and Heroes V Villains

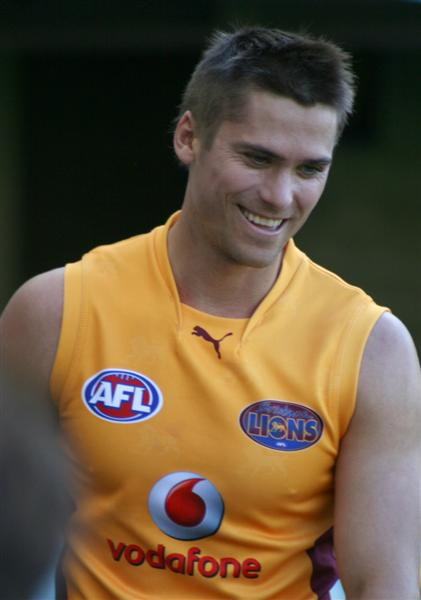
Simon Black, Champions V Contenders II

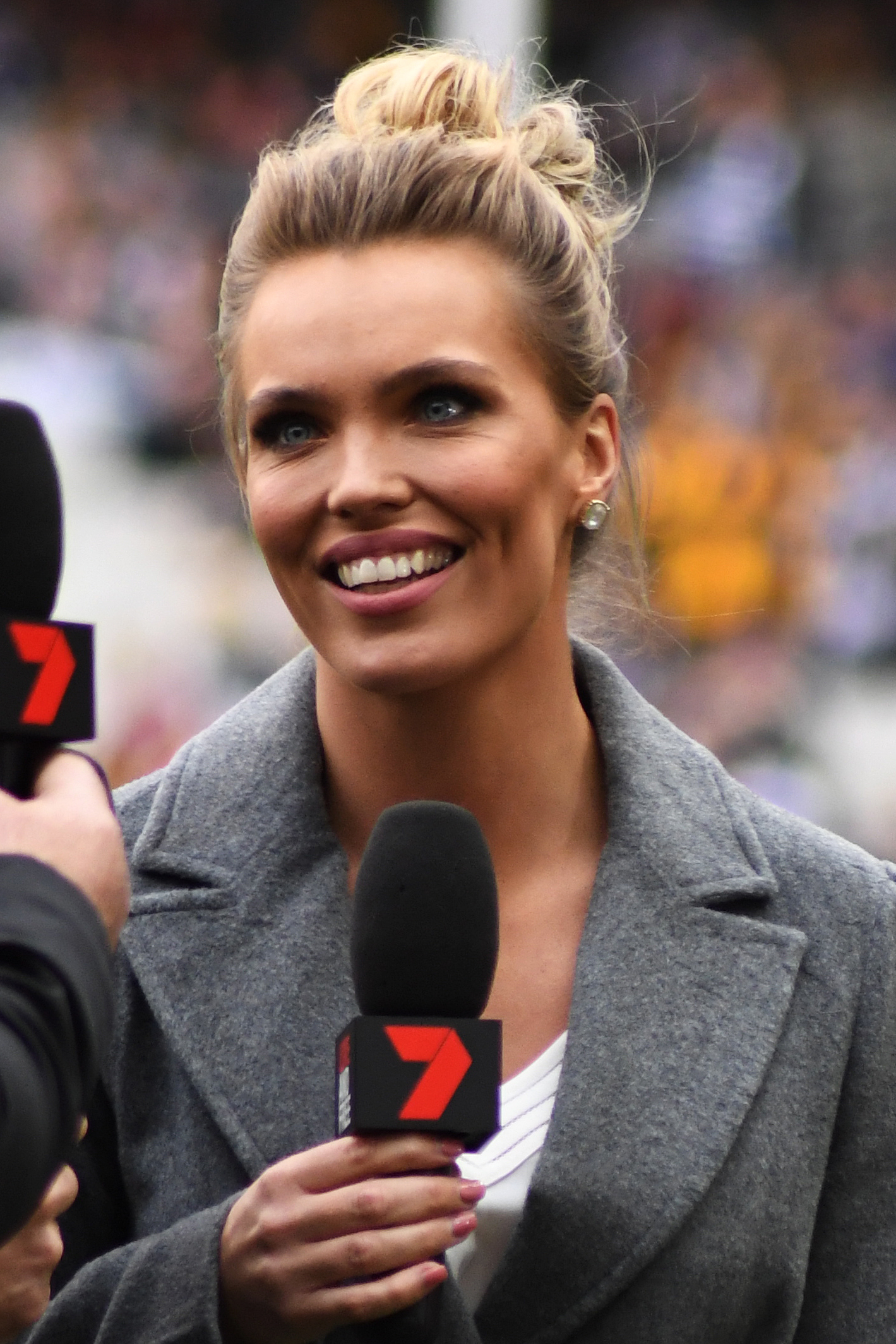
Abbey Holmes, Champions V Contenders II and All Stars

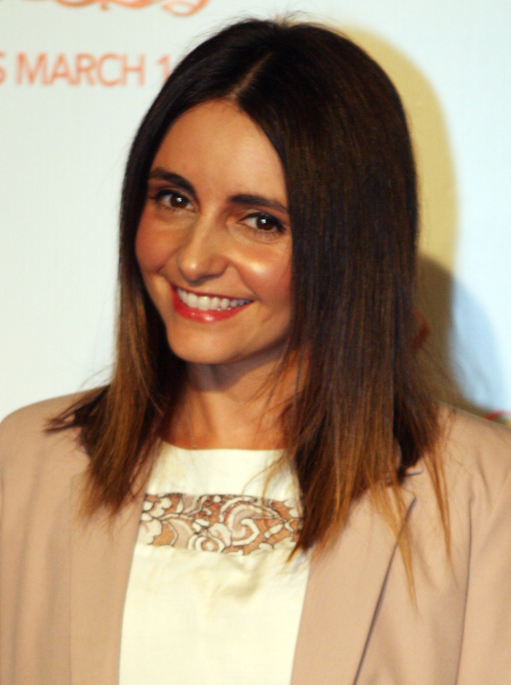
Pia Miranda, Champions V Contenders II

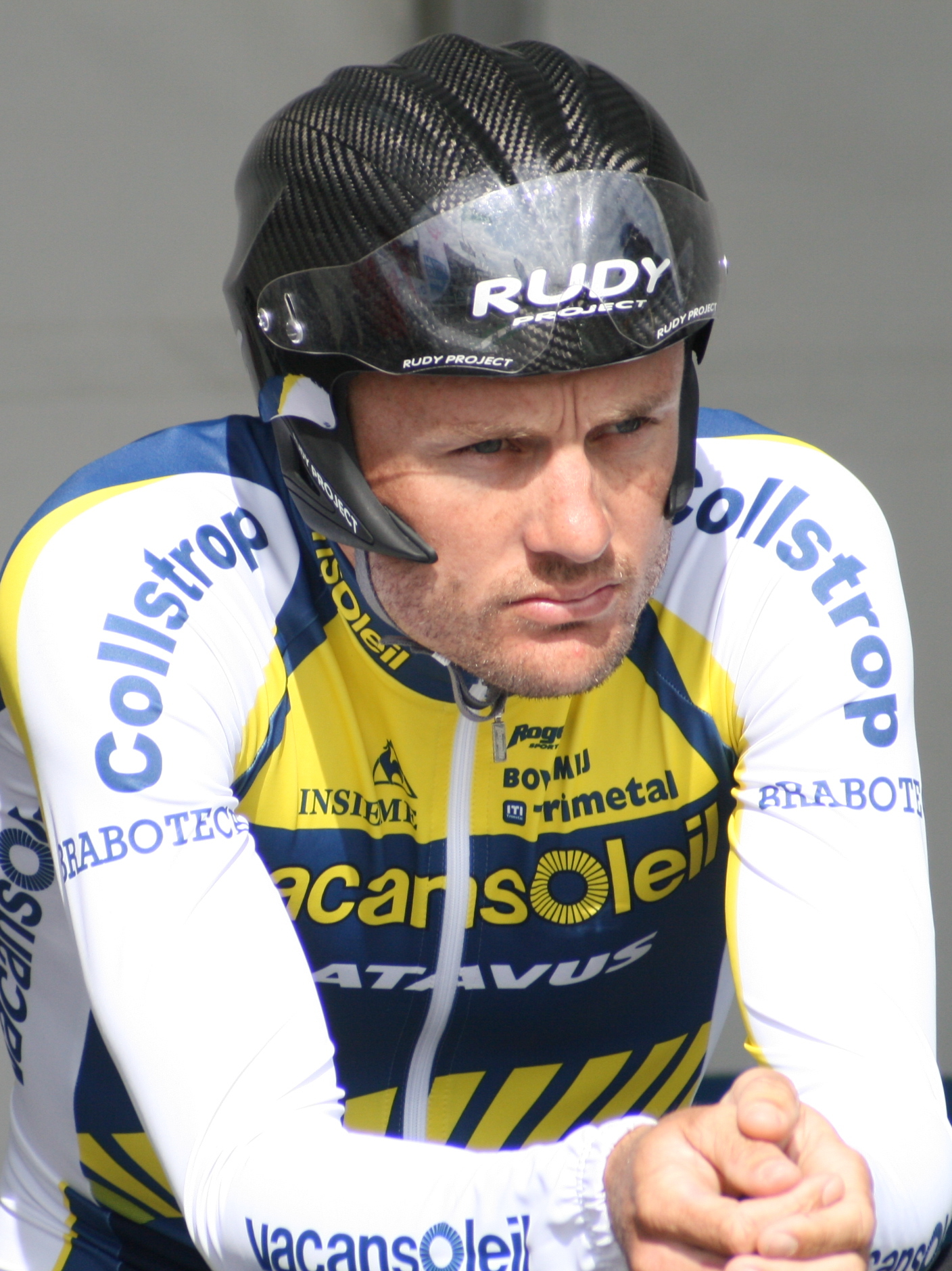
Baden Cooke, Brains V Brawn

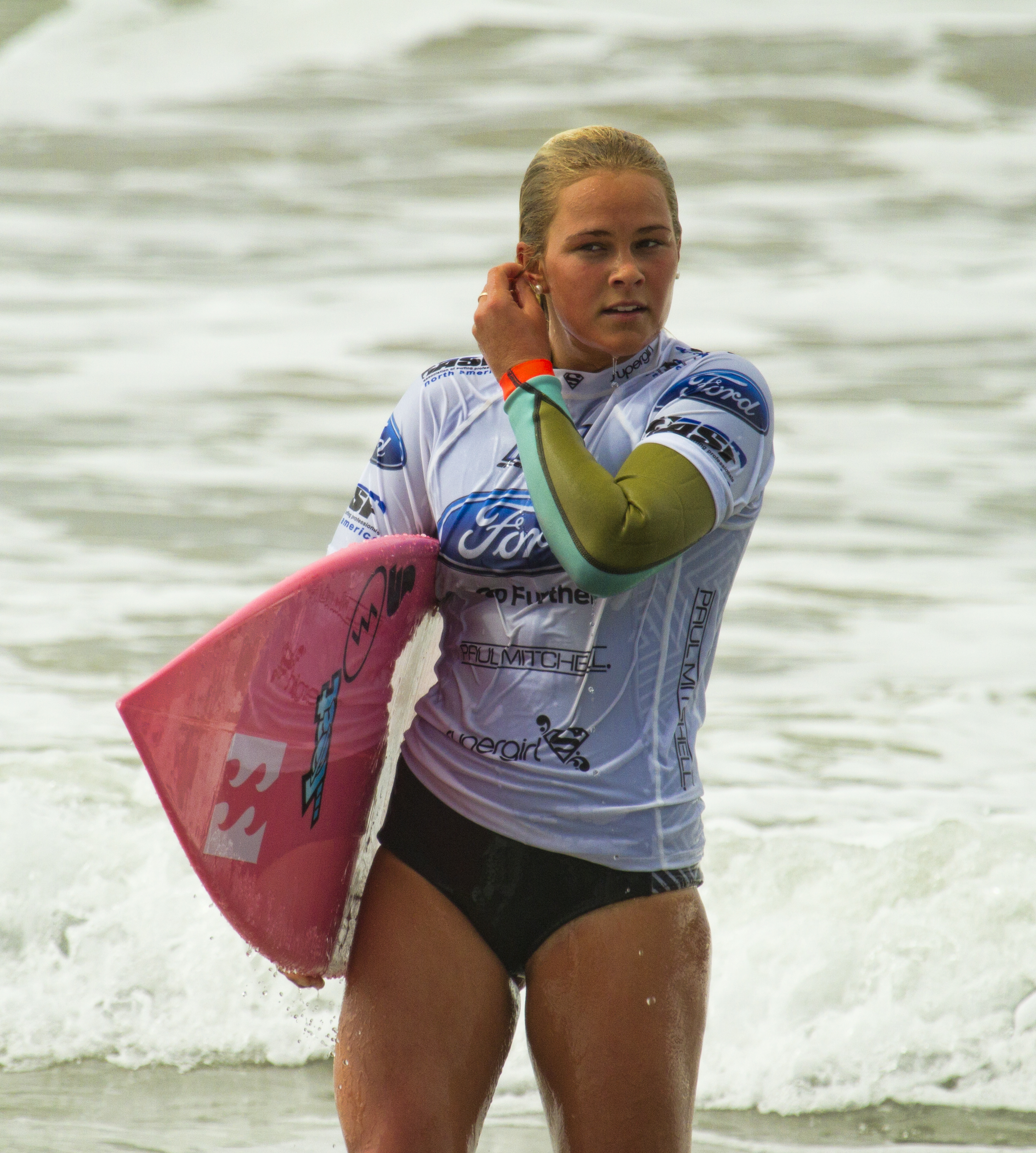
Flick Palmateer, Brains V Brawn and Heroes V Villains

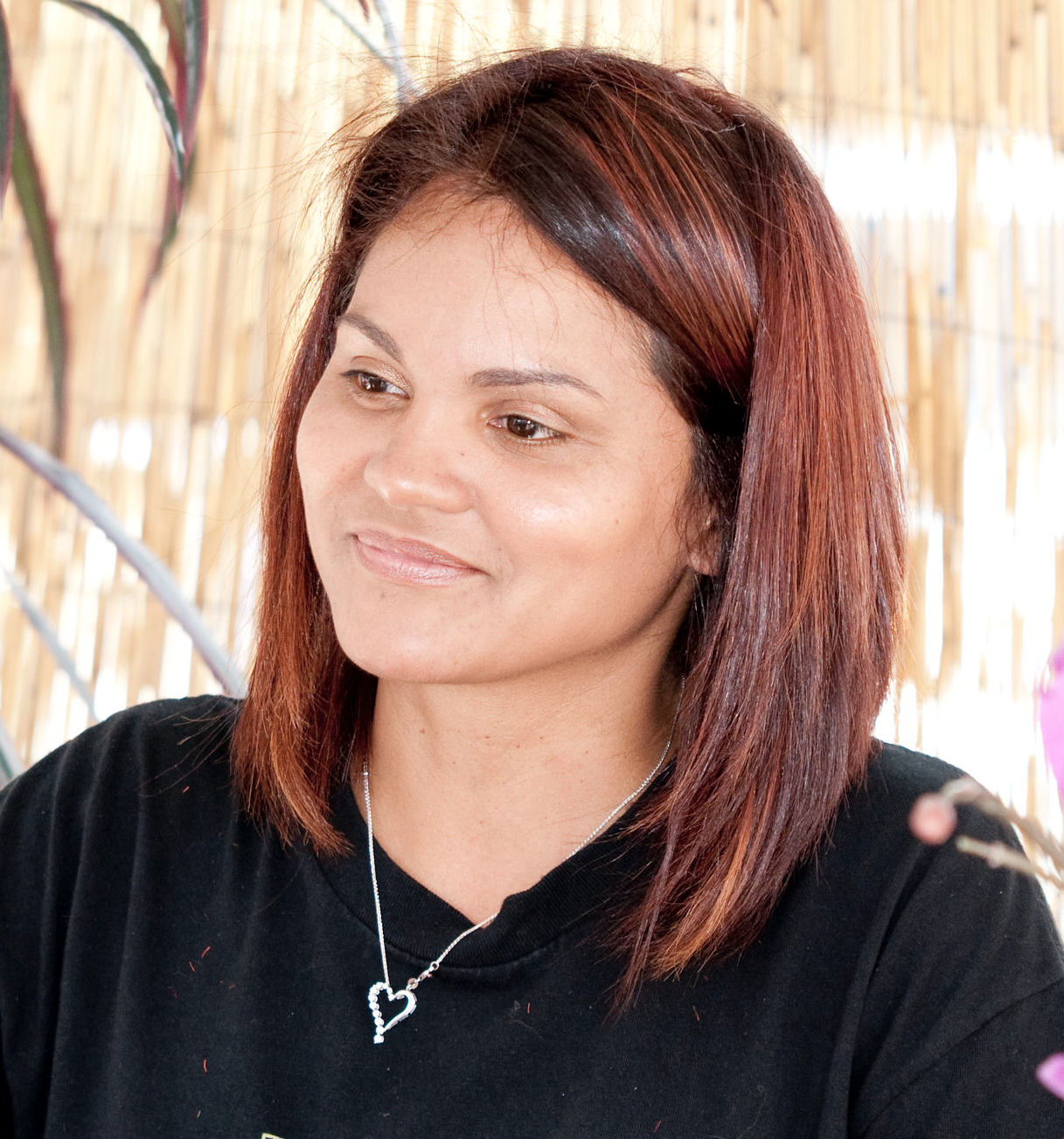
Sandra Diaz-Twine, Blood V Water

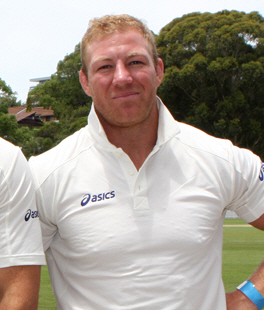
Michael Crocker, Blood V Water

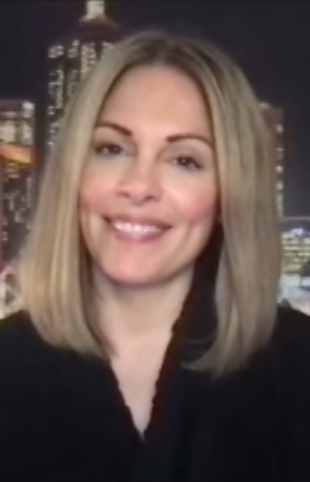
Anjali Rao, Heroes V Villains

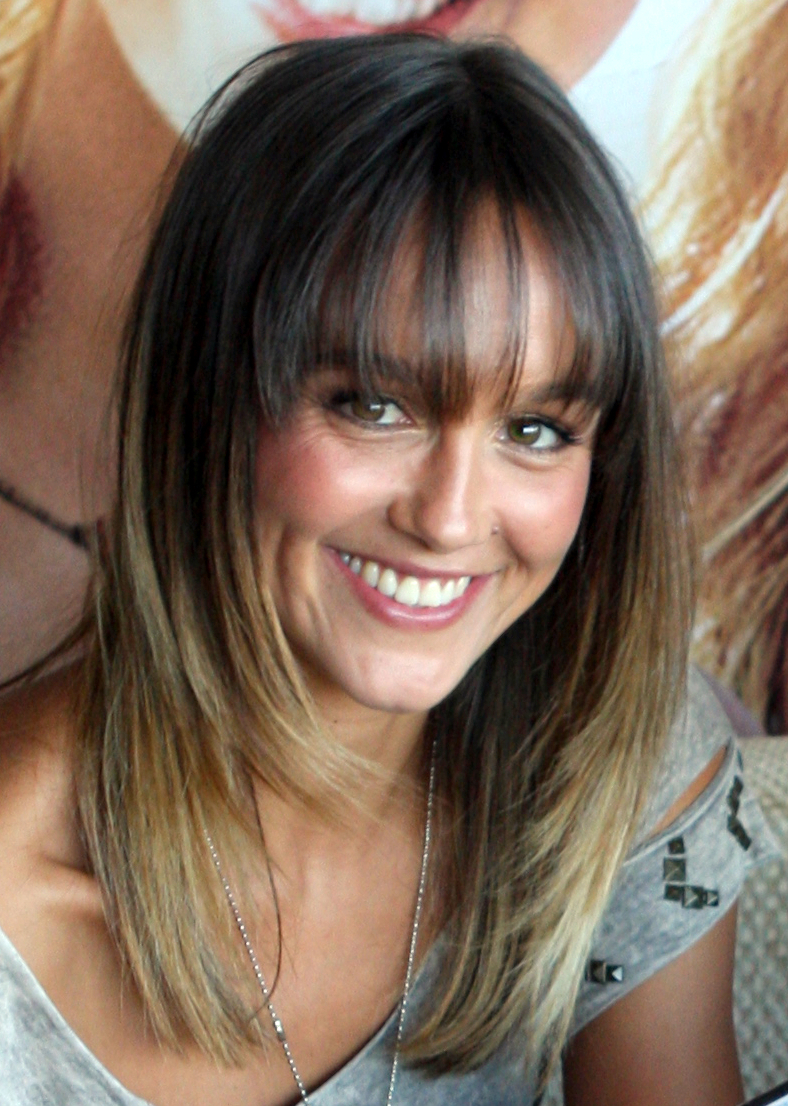
Sharni Vinson, Heroes V Villains

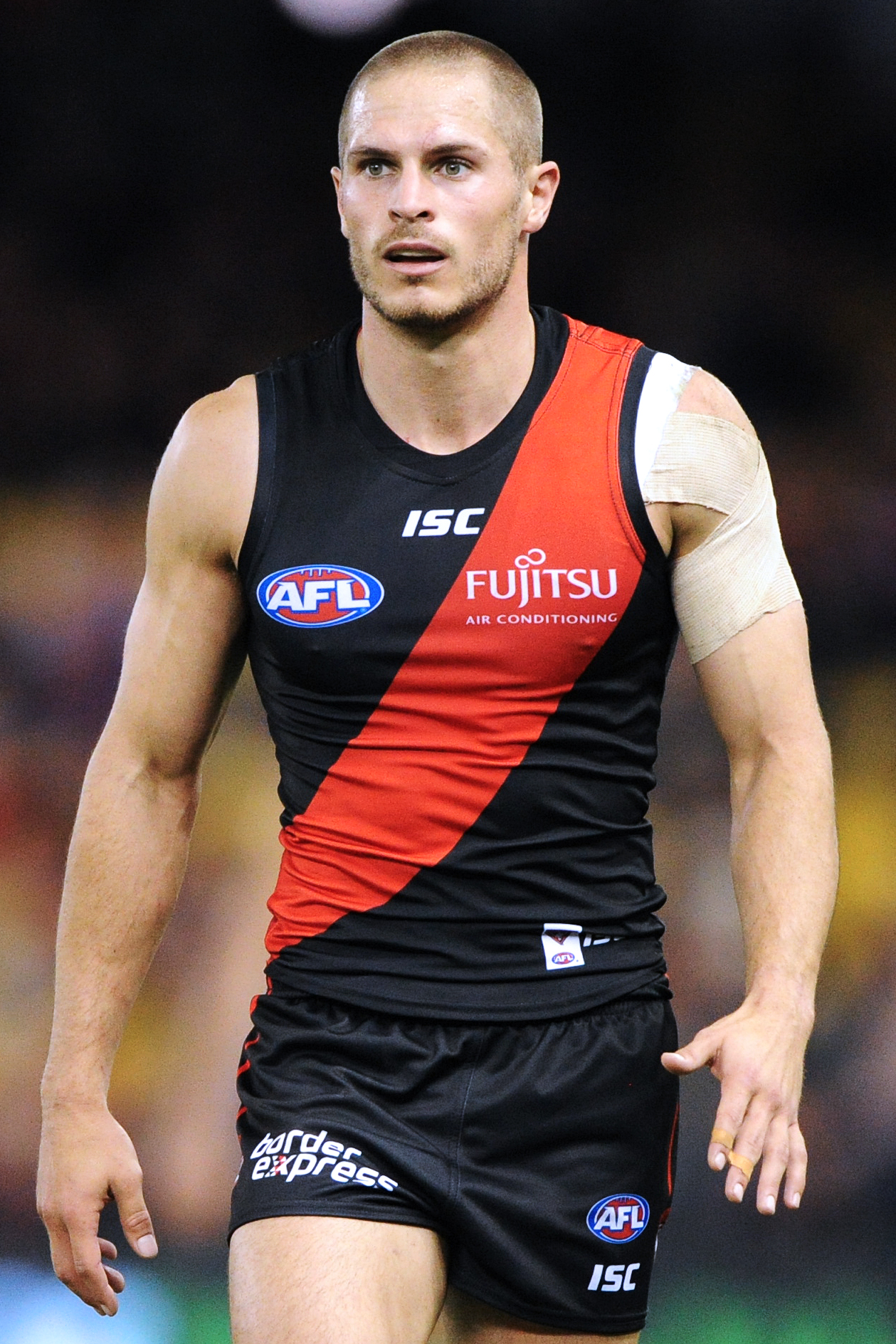
David Zaharakis, Heroes V Villains

Name	Age	Hometown	Occupation	Season	Status	Finish
Lucinda Allen-Rhodes	43	Byron Bay, NSW	Mother	1 (2002)	1st Voted Out: Day 3	16th
Tim Dugan	51	Green Point, NSW	Contract Painter	1 (2002)	2nd Voted Out: Day 6	15th
David Haas	34	Sydney, NSW	IT Consultant	1 (2002)	3rd Voted Out: Day 9	14th
Jeff Brown	52	Canberra, ACT	Police Officer	1 (2002)	4th Voted Out: Day 12	13th
Deborah Peart	26	Sydney, NSW	TV Production Supervisor	1 (2002)	5th Voted Out: Day 15	12th
Sylvan Dorney	25	Sydney, NSW	Writer	1 (2002)	6th Voted Out: Day 18	11th
Caren Shaw	28	Darwin, NT	Radio Host	1 (2002)	7th Voted Out: Day 21	10th
Naomi Knight	22	Melbourne, VIC	School Teacher	1 (2002)	8th Voted Out: Day 24	9th
Craig Abbot	27	Point Lonsdale, VIC	Electrician	1 (2002)	9th Voted Out: Day 27	8th
Lance Brooks	39	Sydney, NSW	Marketing Consultant	1 (2002)	10th Voted Out: Day 30	7th
Jane Dalton	18	Newcastle, NSW	Student	1 (2002)	11th Voted Out: Day 33	6th
Sophie Woods	30	Sydney, NSW	Mother	1 (2002)	12th Voted Out: Day 35	5th
Katie Gold	24	Melbourne, VIC	Professional Athlete	1 (2002)	13th Voted Out: Day 37	4th
Joel Betts	22	Sydney, NSW	Personal Trainer	1 (2002)	14th Voted Out: Day 38	3rd
Sciona Browne	49	Perth, WA	Former Test Pilot	1 (2002)	Runner-Up: Day 39	2nd
Robert "Rob" Dickson	37	Traralgon, VIC	Film & Video Producer	1 (2002)	Sole Survivor: Day 39	1st
Kym Johnson	29	Sydney, NSW	Dancer	Celebrity: Vanuatu	1st Voted Out: Day 3	12th
Benjamin Wynn	32	Perth, WA	Ex-S.A.S. Soldier	Celebrity: Vanuatu	2nd Voted Out: Day 5	11th
Fiona Horne	39	Sydney, NSW	Singer	Celebrity: Vanuatu	3rd Voted Out: Day 7	10th
Amber Petty	35	Melbourne, VIC	Entertainment Reporter	Celebrity: Vanuatu	4th Voted Out: Day 9	9th
Wayne Gardner	46	Wollongong, NSW	Motorcycle Racer	Celebrity: Vanuatu	5th Voted Out: Day 11	8th
Elton Flatley	28	Tamworth, NSW	Rugby Union Footballer	Celebrity: Vanuatu	7th Voted Out: Day 15	7th
Gabrielle Richens	31	Kent, England	Model/TV Presenter	Celebrity: Vanuatu	9th Voted Out: Day 19	6th
David Oldfield	47	Manly, NSW	Politician	Celebrity: Vanuatu	10th Voted Out: Day 21	5th
Nicolle Dickson	37	Sydney, NSW	Actress	Celebrity: Vanuatu	11th Voted Out: Day 23	4th
Imogen Bailey	28	Canberra, ACT	Actress/Model	Celebrity: Vanuatu	12th Voted Out: Day 24	3rd
Justin Melvey	37	Sydney, NSW	Actor	Celebrity: Vanuatu	8th Voted Out: Day 17; Runner-Up: Day 25	2nd
Guy Leech	42	Sydney, NSW	Surf Lifesaving Champion	Celebrity: Vanuatu	6th Voted Out: Day 13; Sole Survivor: Day 25	1st
Destin "Des" Quilty	59	Sunshine Coast, QLD	Courier Driver	3 (2016)	1st Voted Out: Day 2	24th
Bianca Anderson	36	Melbourne, VIC	Private Investigator	3 (2016)	2nd Voted Out: Day 5	23rd
Evan Jones	30	Melbourne, VIC	High School Teacher	3 (2016)	3rd Voted Out: Day 8	22nd
Peter Fiegehen	62	Canberra, ACT	Air Traffic Controller	3 (2016)	Quit: Day 10	21st
Barry Lea	43	Cairns, QLD	Radio Host/Ex-Rugby International	3 (2016)	4th Voted Out: Day 14	20th
Tegan Haining	33	Sydney, NSW	Personal Trainer/Model	3 (2016)	5th Voted Out: Day 17	19th
Rohan MacLaren	27	Melbourne, VIC	Model	3 (2016)	6th Voted Out: Day 21	18th
Katherine "Kat" Dumont	26	Perth, WA	Partnerships and Brand Manager	3 (2016)	7th Voted Out: Day 23	17th
Andrew Torrens	28	Brisbane, QLD	Marketing Executive	3 (2016)	8th Voted Out: Day 25	16th
Craig I'Anson	31	Brisbane, QLD	Emergency Services Recruitment Officer	3 (2016)	9th Voted Out: Day 27	15th
Phoebe Timmins	27	Sydney, NSW	Criminal Lawyer	3 (2016)	10th Voted Out: Day 31	14th
Conner Bethune	22	Canberra, ACT	Law Student	3 (2016)	11th Voted Out: Day 33	13th
Kate Campbell	28	Perth, WA	Financial Analyst	3 (2016)	12th Voted Out: Day 35	12th
Nick Iadanza	27	Adelaide, SA	High School Teacher	3 (2016)	13th Voted Out: Day 37	11th
Kylie Evans	37	Melbourne, VIC	Firefighter	3 (2016)	14th Voted Out: Day 39	10th
Sue Clarke	59	Perth, WA	Personal Trainer/Retired Customs Officer	3 (2016)	15th Voted Out: Day 41	9th
Jennah-Louise Salkeld	27	Gold Coast, QLD	Law Graduate	3 (2016)	16th Voted Out: Day 43	8th
Brooke Jowett	23	Melbourne, VIC	Sales Executive	3 (2016)	17th Voted Out: Day 45	7th
Samuel "Sam" Webb	27	Sydney, NSW	Charity co-founder and CEO	3 (2016)	18th Voted Out: Day 49	6th
Matt Tarrant	28	Adelaide, SA	Magician/Mentalist	3 (2016)	19th Voted Out: Day 51	5th
Felicity "Flick" Egginton	23	Gold Coast, QLD	Personal Assistant/Bartender	3 (2016)	20th Voted Out: Day 53	4th
Elana "El" Rowland	33	Brisbane, QLD	Army Corporal/Charity Worker	3 (2016)	21st Voted Out: Day 54	3rd
Lee Carseldine	40	Brisbane, QLD	Aerial Photographer/Ex-Pro Cricketer	3 (2016)	Runner-Up: Day 55	2nd
Kristie Bennett	24	Sydney, NSW	Senior Account Executive	3 (2016)	Sole Survivor: Day 55	1st
Joan Caballero	29	Sydney, NSW	Escape Room Owner	4 (2017)	1st Voted Out: Day 3	24th
Adam Parkin	40	Brisbane, QLD	International Poker Player	4 (2017)	2nd Voted Out: Day 6	23rd
Kate Temby	47	Melbourne, VIC	Financial Executive	4 (2017)	3rd Voted Out: Day 9	22nd
Mark "Tarzan" Herlaar	51	Toowoomba, QLD	Lime Farmer	4 (2017)	4th Voted Out: Day 11	21st
Aimee Stanton	23	Melbourne, VIC	Plumber	4 (2017)	5th Voted Out: Day 13	20th
Samantha "Sam" Gash	32	Melbourne, VIC	Endurance Athlete	4 (2017)	6th Voted Out: Day 16	19th
Mark Wales	37	Perth, WA	Former Special Ops Commander	4 (2017)	7th Voted Out: Day 18	18th
Jacqui Patterson	50	Byron Bay, NSW	Marriage Celebrant	4 (2017)	8th Voted Out: Day 22	17th
Kent Nelson	51	Adelaide, SA	Chief Financial Officer	4 (2017)	9th Voted Out: Day 24	16th
Aaron "A.K." Knight	29	Adelaide, SA	Wedding DJ	4 (2017)	10th Voted Out: Day 28	15th
Ben Morgan	20	Perth, WA	Fast Food Attendant	4 (2017)	11th Voted Out: Day 30	14th
Odette Blacklock	32	Sydney, NSW	Podiatrist	4 (2017)	12th Voted Out: Day 34	13th
Jarrad Seng	29	Mount Lawley, WA	Photographer	4 (2017)	13th Voted Out: Day 36	12th
Anneliese Wilson	23	Melbourne, VIC	Student	4 (2017)	14th Voted Out: Day 38	11th
Henry Nicholson	26	Adelaide, SA	Labourer	4 (2017)	15th Voted Out: Day 40	10th
Tessa O’Halloran	29	Melbourne, VIC	Doctor	4 (2017)	16th Voted Out: Day 42	9th
Sarah Tilleke	22	Perth, WA	Model	4 (2017)	17th Voted Out: Day 44	8th
Luke Toki	30	Perth, WA	Mining Technician	4 (2017)	18th Voted Out: Day 46	7th
Nicola Maree "Ziggy" Zagame	26	Gymea Bay, NSW	Olympian	4 (2017)	19th Voted Out: Day 47	6th
Locklan "Locky" Gilbert	27	Perth, WA	Adventure Guide	4 (2017)	20th Voted Out: Day 49	5th
Michelle Dougan	33	Sydney, NSW	Nanny	4 (2017)	21st Voted Out: Day 52	4th
Peter Conte	22	Sydney, NSW	Digital Advertising Producer	4 (2017)	22nd Voted Out: Day 54	3rd
Tara Pitt	32	Sunshine Coast, QLD	Barrel Racer	4 (2017)	Runner-Up: Day 55	2nd
Jericho Malabonga	25	Melbourne, VIC	Flight Attendant	4 (2017)	Sole Survivor: Day 55	1st
Matt Dyson	35	Brisbane, QLD	Traffic Police Officer	Champions V Contenders	1st Voted Out: Day 2	24th
Russell Hantz ^{o}	45	Dayton, Texas, US	Oilfield Service Company Owner (American Survivor contestant)	Champions V Contenders	2nd Voted Out: Day 5	23rd
Damien Thomlinson	36	Sydney, NSW	Former Special Forces Commando	Champions V Contenders	3rd Voted Out: Day 8	22nd
Steve Khouw	58	Sydney, NSW	Take-away Delivery Rider	Champions V Contenders	4th Voted Out: Day 11	21st
Jenna Austin	28	Perth, WA	FIFO Worker	Champions V Contenders	5th Voted Out: Day 13	20th
Moana Hope	30	Melbourne, VIC	AFL Women's Player	Champions V Contenders	6th Voted Out: Day 16	19th
Anita Berkett	50	Sunshine Coast, QLD	Sales Representative	Champions V Contenders	Lost Exile Duel: Day 21	18th
Zach Kozyrski	39	Perth, WA	Personal Trainer	Champions V Contenders	9th Voted Out: Day 22	17th
Paige Kerin	24	Adelaide, SA	Marketing Coordinator	Champions V Contenders	10th Voted Out: Day 24	16th
Jackie Glazier	44	Melbourne, VIC	World Series Poker Player	Champions V Contenders	11th Voted Out: Day 26	15th
Tegan Gasior	32	Derby, WA	Management Consultant	Champions V Contenders	12th Voted Out: Day 28	14th
Heath Davies	33	Brisbane, QLD	Builder	Champions V Contenders	13th Voted Out: Day 30	13th
Lydia Lassila	36	Melbourne, VIC	Olympic Freestyle Skiing Gold Medalist	Champions V Contenders	14th Voted Out: Day 32	12th
Robert "Robbie" Skibicki	26	Adelaide, SA	Construction Manager	Champions V Contenders	15th Voted Out: Day 33	11th
Samuel Hinton	26	Brisbane, QLD	Astrophysicist	Champions V Contenders	16th Voted Out: Day 35	10th
Mat Rogers	42	Gold Coast, QLD	Former dual-code Rugby Footballer	Champions V Contenders	17th Voted Out: Day 37	9th
Benjamin "Benji" Wilson	26	Melbourne, VIC	Entrepreneur	Champions V Contenders	18th Voted Out: Day 39	8th
Steve Willis	42	Sydney, NSW	Fitness Specialist and Television Personality	Champions V Contenders	19th Voted Out: Day 42	7th
Fenella McGowan	33	Melbourne, VIC	Interior Designer	Champions V Contenders	20th Voted Out: Day 44	6th
Monika Radulovic	27	Sydney, NSW	Miss Universe Australia 2015	Champions V Contenders	21st Voted Out: Day 46	5th
Shonee Fairfax	26	Tewantin, QLD	Professional Skater's Wife	Champions V Contenders	22nd Voted Out: Day 47	4th
Brian Lake	36	Melbourne, VIC	Former AFL Footballer	Champions V Contenders	23rd Voted Out: Day 49	3rd
Sharn Coombes	41	Melbourne, VIC	Criminal Barrister	Champions V Contenders	Runner-Up: Day 50	2nd
Shane Gould	61	Bicheno, TAS	Olympic Swimming Gold Medalist	Champions V Contenders	Sole Survivor: Day 50	1st
Anastasia Woolmer	42	Brisbane, QLD	Australian Memory Champion	Champions V Contenders II	1st Voted Out: Day 2	24th
Laura Choong	31	Sydney, NSW	Digital Marketing Manager	Champions V Contenders II	2nd Voted Out: Day 5	23rd
Susie Maroney	44	Cronulla, NSW	Marathon Swimmer	Champions V Contenders II	3rd Voted Out: Day 7	22nd
Nova Peris	48	Darwin, NT	Former Politician & Olympian	Champions V Contenders II	4th Voted Out: Day 10	21st
Steven Bradbury	45	Camden, NSW	Olympic speed skater	Champions V Contenders II	5th Voted Out: Day 12	20th
Andrew "E.T." Ettingshausen	53	Sutherland, NSW	NRL Legend	Champions V Contenders II	6th Voted Out: Day 14	19th
Samantha "Sam" Schoers	30	Perth, WA	VIP Gaming Manager	Champions V Contenders II	7th Voted Out: Day 16	18th
Sarah Ayles	45	Adelaide, SA	Cleaner	Champions V Contenders II	8th Voted Out: Day 18	17th
Hannah Pentreath	27	Bendigo, VIC	Police Officer	Champions V Contenders II	9th Voted Out: Day 22	16th
Casey Hawkins	31	Melbourne, VIC	Educator	Champions V Contenders II	10th Voted Out: Day 24	15th
Matt Farrelly	29	Sydney, NSW	High School History Teacher/Professional Wrestler	Champions V Contenders II	11th Voted Out: Day 26	14th
Ross Clarke-Jones	53	Central Coast, NSW	Big Wave Surfer	Champions V Contenders II	Medically Evacuated: Day 28^{‡}	13th
Andrew "Andy" Meldrum	47	Noosa, QLD	Marketing Executive	Champions V Contenders II	12th Voted Out: Day 30	12th
Shaun Hampson	31	Melbourne, VIC	Former AFL Player	Champions V Contenders II	13th Voted Out: Day 32	11th
David Genat	39	Brooklyn, New York, US	International Supermodel	Champions V Contenders II	14th Voted Out: Day 34	10th
John Eastoe	28	Kalgoorlie, WA	Gold Miner	Champions V Contenders II	15th Voted Out: Day 36	9th
Daisy Richardson	24	Adavale, QLD	Travel Agent	Champions V Contenders II	Lost Exile Duel: Day 41	8th
Simon Black	40	Brisbane, QLD	Former AFL Player	Champions V Contenders II	18th Voted Out: Day 42	7th
Janine Allis	53	Melbourne, VIC	CEO of Retail Zoo & Boost Juice	Champions V Contenders II	19th Voted Out: Day 44	6th
Abbey Holmes	28	Adelaide, SA	AFL Women's player	Champions V Contenders II	20th Voted Out: Day 46	5th
Luke Toki ^{^}	32	Perth, WA	Australian Survivor Contestant	Champions V Contenders II	21st Voted Out: Day 48	4th
Harry Hills	30	Perth, WA	Ice-Cream Maker	Champions V Contenders II	22nd Voted Out: Day 49	3rd
Baden Gilbert	23	Adelaide, SA	Student	Champions V Contenders II	Runner-Up: Day 50	2nd
Pia Miranda	46	Melbourne, VIC	Actress	Champions V Contenders II	Sole Survivor: Day 50	1st
Shane Gould ^{^}	62	Bicheno, TAS	Olympic Swimming Legend	All-Stars	1st Voted Out: Day 2	24th
Jericho Malabonga ^{^}	28	Melbourne, VIC	Flight Attendant	All-Stars	2nd Voted Out: Day 5	23rd
Daisy Richardson ^{^}	24	Adavale, QLD	Travel Agent	All-Stars	3rd Voted Out: Day 7	22nd
Michelle Dougan ^{^}	35	Sydney, NSW	Nanny	All-Stars	4th Voted Out: Day 9	21st
Henry Nicholson ^{^}	29	Adelaide, SA	Teacher	All-Stars	5th Voted Out: Day 12	20th
Abbey Holmes ^{^}	29	Adelaide, SA	AFL Premiership Winner	All-Stars	6th Voted Out: Day 16	19th
Lydia Lassila ^{^}	37	Melbourne, VIC	Olympic Freestyle Skier	All-Stars	Lost Fire Duel: Day 18	18th
John Eastoe ^{^}	29	Kalgoorlie, WA	Gold Miner	All-Stars	8th Voted Out: Day 20	17th
Mat Rogers ^{^}	43	Gold Coast, QLD	NRL Legend	All-Stars	9th Voted Out: Day 22	16th
Phoebe Timmins ^{^}	30	Sydney, NSW	Criminal Lawyer	All-Stars	10th Voted Out: Day 24	15th
Felicity "Flick" Egginton ^{^}	27	Gold Coast, QLD	Travel Consultant	All-Stars	11th Voted Out: Day 26	14th
Nick Iadanza ^{^}	31	Adelaide, SA	High School Teacher	All-Stars	12th Voted Out: Day 28	13th
Locklan "Locky" Gilbert ^{^}	30	Perth, WA	Adventure Guide	All-Stars	13th Voted Out: Day 30	12th
Harry Hills ^{^}	31	Perth, WA	Ice Cream Maker	All-Stars	14th Voted Out: Day 32	11th
Lee Carseldine ^{^}	43	Brisbane, QLD	Aerial Photographer/Ex Pro Cricketer	All-Stars	Withdrew: Day 33 ^{‡}	10th
Zach Kozryski ^{^}	40	Perth, WA	Personal Trainer	All-Stars	15th Voted Out: Day 38	9th
Jacqui Patterson ^{^}	52	Byron Bay, NSW	Wedding Celebrant	All-Stars	16th Voted Out: Day 40	8th
Shonee Fairfax ^{^}	27	Tewantin, QLD	Personal Assistant	All-Stars	17th Voted Out: Day 42	7th
Aaron "A.K." Knight ^{^}	32	Adelaide, SA	Wedding DJ	All-Stars	Lost Trial By Fire: Day 44	6th
Mark "Tarzan" Herlaar ^{^}	53	Toowoomba, QLD	Lime Farmer	All-Stars	19th Voted Out: Day 46	5th
Brooke Jowett ^{^}	27	Melbourne, VIC	Fitness Professional	All-Stars	20th Voted Out: Day 47	4th
Moana Hope ^{^}	31	Melbourne, VIC	AFLW Player	All-Stars	21st Voted Out: Day 49	3rd
Sharn Coombes ^{^}	42	Melbourne, VIC	Criminal Barrister	All-Stars	Runner Up: Day 50	2nd
David Genat ^{^}	40	Brooklyn, New York, US	International Model	All-Stars	Sole Survivor: Day 50	1st
Phil Ferguson	28	Melbourne, VIC	Crochet Artist	Brains V Brawn	1st Voted Out: Day 2	24th
Janelle Durso	43	Townsville, QLD	Cleaner	Brains V Brawn	2nd Voted Out: Day 5	23rd
Gavin Wanganeen	48	Adelaide, SA	Former AFL Player	Brains V Brawn	3rd Voted Out: Day 7	22nd
Shaun "Benny" Burdo	38	Los Angeles, California, US	Entrepreneur	Brains V Brawn	4th Voted Out: Day 9	21st
Mitchell "Mitch" Shaw	33	Sydney, NSW	Doctor	Brains V Brawn	5th Voted Out: Day 12	20th
Joey McCann	35	Sydney, NSW	Head of Partnerships	Brains V Brawn	6th Voted Out: Day 16	19th
Daini Tuiqere	26	Sydney, NSW	Personal Trainer	Brains V Brawn	7th Voted Out: Day 18	18th
Shannon Lawson	30	Sydney, NSW	Influencer	Brains V Brawn	8th Voted Out: Day 19	17th
Georgia Ray	35	Noosa, QLD	Forensic Psychologist	Brains V Brawn	9th Voted Out: Day 21	16th
Rachel Downie	50	Sunshine Coast, QLD	Teacher/Businesswoman	Brains V Brawn	10th Voted Out: Day 23	15th
Simon Mee	31	Brisbane, QLD	Carpenter	Brains V Brawn	11th Voted Out: Day 25	14th
Kerryn "Kez" McGee	25	Perth, WA	Bodybuilder	Brains V Brawn	12th Voted Out: Day 27	13th
Chelsea Hackett	21	Gold Coast, QLD	MMA fighter	Brains V Brawn	Medically Evacuated: Day 31 ^{‡}	12th
Baden Cooke	42	Benalla, VIC	Ex-Pro Cyclist	Brains V Brawn	Lost Redemption Duel: Day 31	11th
Gerald Youles	26	Kilcoy, QLD	Champion Wood Chopper	Brains V Brawn	15th Voted Out: Day 33	10th
Laura Wells	36	Sydney, NSW	Marine biologist & Model	Brains V Brawn	16th Voted Out: Day 35	9th
Emmett Pugh	31	Sydney, NSW	Health Coach & Model	Brains V Brawn	17th Voted Out: Day 37	8th
Andrew Ucles	33	Alice Springs, NT	Survival Expert	Brains V Brawn	18th Voted Out: Day 39	7th
Dani Beale	34	Bendigo, VIC	Prison Officer	Brains V Brawn	19th Voted Out: Day 43	6th
Wai Chim	38	Sydney, NSW	Author	Brains V Brawn	20th Voted Out: Day 44	5th
Cara Atchinson	47	Sydney, NSW	Real Estate Agent	Brains V Brawn	21st Voted Out: Day 45	4th
Felicity "Flick" Palmateer	28	Burleigh Heads, QLD	Big Wave Surfer	Brains V Brawn	22nd Voted Out: Day 47	3rd
George Mladenov	31	Sydney, NSW	Former Political Operative	Brains V Brawn	Runner Up: Day 48	2nd
Hayley Leake	31	Sydney, NSW	Pain Researcher	Brains V Brawn	Sole Survivor: Day 48	1st
Andrew "Andy" Meldrum ^{^}	49	Coolum Beach, QLD	Advertising Consultant	Blood V Water	1st Voted Out: Day 2	24th
Briana Goodchild	26	Brisbane, QLD	Digital Producer & Rollerskator	Blood V Water	2nd Voted Out: Day 5	23rd
Kate Tatham	46	Noosa, QLD	Stay-At-Home Mum	Blood V Water	3rd Voted Out: Day 7	22nd
Alex Frost	26	Melbourne, VIC	Warehouse Operator	Blood V Water	Quit: Day 12	21st
Jay Bruno	34	Melbourne, VIC	Drummer	Blood V Water	4th Voted Out: Day 14	20th
Sandra Diaz-Twine ^{o}	47	Riverview, Florida, US	Case Manager (American Survivor contestant (Winner: 7 and 20))	Blood V Water	5th Voted Out: Day 16	19th
Sophie Cachia	31	Melbourne, VIC	Company Director	Blood V Water	6th Voted Out: Day 18	18th
Amy Ong	24	Melbourne, VIC	Beautician	Blood V Water	7th Voted Out: Day 20	17th
Alanna "Nina" Twine	24	Fayetteville, North Carolina, US	Accounts Clerk	Blood V Water	Medically Evacuated: Day 22	16th
Michael "Croc" Crocker	41	Sunshine Coast, QLD	Former NRL player & Crane Dogman	Blood V Water	8th Voted Out: Day 23	15th
Ben Watson	33	Sunshine Coast, QLD	Tradie/Photographer	Blood V Water	Lost Fire Duel: Day 24	14th
Khanh Ong	30	Melbourne, VIC	Restaurateur	Blood V Water	9th Voted Out: Day 27	13th
Melissa "Mel" Chiang	33	Melbourne, VIC	Chiropractor	Blood V Water	10th Voted Out: Day 28	12th
Jesse Hansen	22	Canberra, ACT	Triathlete & student	Blood V Water	11th Voted Out: Day 30	11th
Michelle Chiang	33	Sydney, NSW	Speech Pathologist	Blood V Water	Lost Purgatory Challenge: Day 36	10th
Jordan Schmidt	29	Melbourne, VIC	Personal Trainer	Blood V Water	12th Voted Out: Day 38	9th
Samantha "Sam" Gash ^{^}	37	Melbourne, VIC	Endurance Athlete	Blood V Water	13th Voted Out: Day 40	8th
David Goodchild	51	Morningside, QLD	Project Manager	Blood V Water	14th Voted Out: Day 42	7th
Jordie Hansen	25	Melbourne, VIC	Landscaper	Blood V Water	15th Voted Out: Day 43	6th
Kate "KJ" Austin	37	Melbourne, VIC	Ex-Flight Attendant & Stay-At-Home Mum	Blood V Water	16th Voted Out: Day 45	5th
Josh Millgate	31	Melbourne, VIC	Pilot	Blood V Water	17th Voted Out: Day 46	4th
Shayelle Lajoie	31	Sunshine Coast, QLD	Bio-Medical Student & Yoga Instructor	Blood V Water	Runner Up: Day 47	2nd
Christina "Chrissy" Zaremba	42	Sunshine Coast, QLD	Teacher	Blood V Water	Runner Up: Day 47	2nd
Mark Wales ^{^}	41	Melbourne, VIC	Former Special Ops Commander	Blood V Water	Sole Survivor: Day 47	1st
Jackie Glazier ^{^}	49	Melbourne, VIC	World Series Poker Player	Heroes V Villians	Medically Evacuated: Day 2 ^{‡}	24th
Anjali Rao	48	Melbourne, VIC	News Anchor	Heroes V Villians	1st Voted Out: Day 2	23rd
Michael Warren	44	Sydney, NSW	Journalist	Heroes V Villians	2nd Voted Out: Day 5	22nd
Mimi Tang	30	Melbourne, VIC	Luxury Car PR Owner	Heroes V Villians	3rd Voted Out: Day 7	21st
Rogue Rubin	34	Melbourne, VIC	Animal Activist	Heroes V Villians	4th Voted Out: Day 9	20th
Sarah Marschke	23	Adelaide, SA	Former Miss World Australia	Heroes V Villians	5th Voted Out: Day 14	19th
Fraser Lack	30	Melbourne, VIC	Real Estate Manager	Heroes V Villians	6th Voted Out: Day 15	18th
Sharni Vinson	39	Sydney, NSW	Actress	Heroes V Villians	7th Voted Out: Day 17	17th
Paige Donald	26	Tambo, QLD	Jillaroo	Heroes V Villians	8th Voted Out: Day 19	16th
Jordie Hansen ^{^}	26	Melbourne, VIC	Landscaper	Heroes V Villians	9th Voted Out: Day 21	15th
Benjamin Law	40	Nambour, QLD	Author	Heroes V Villians	10th Voted Out:Day 22	14th
Steve Khouw ^{^}	62	Sydney, NSW	Takeaway Delivery Rider	Heroes V Villians	11th Voted Out: Day 27	13th
David Zaharakis	32	Melbourne, VIC	Former AFL Player	Heroes V Villians	12th Voted Out: Day 29	12th
Felicity Palmateer ^{^}	30	Burleigh Heads, QLD	Big Wave Surfer	Heroes V Villians	13th Voted Out: Day 31	11th
Sam Webb ^{^}	34	Sydney, NSW	Charity CEO	Heroes V Villians	14th Voted Out: Day 33	10th
Shonee Bowtell ^{†}	30	Noosa, QLD	Personal Assistant	Heroes V Villians	15th Voted Out: Day 35	9th
Shaun Hampson ^{^}	34	Melbourne, VIC	Retired AFL Player	Heroes V Villians	16th Voted Out: Day 37	8th
Hayley Leake ^{^}	32	Adelaide, SA	Pain Researcher	Heroes V Villians	17th Voted Out: Day 39	7th
Simon Mee ^{^}	33	Brisbane, QLD	Carpenter	Heroes V Villians	18th Voted Out: Day 42	6th
Alanna "Nina" Twine ^{^}	25	Fayetteville, North Carolina, US	Accounts Clerk	Heroes V Villians	19th Voted Out: Day 44	5th
George Mladenov ^{^}	32	Bankstown, NSW	Public Servant	Heroes V Villians	20th Voted Out: Day 46	4th
Gerry Geltch	62	Melbourne, VIC	Tourism Pilot	Heroes V Villians	Runner-Up: Day 47	2nd
Matt Sharp	25	Sydney, NSW	Lifeguard	Heroes V Villians	Runner-Up: Day 47	2nd
Liz Parnov	28	Perth, WA	Olympic Pole-Vaulter	Heroes V Villians	Sole Survivor: Day 47	1st

== Seasons 11–14 (2024–2026) ==
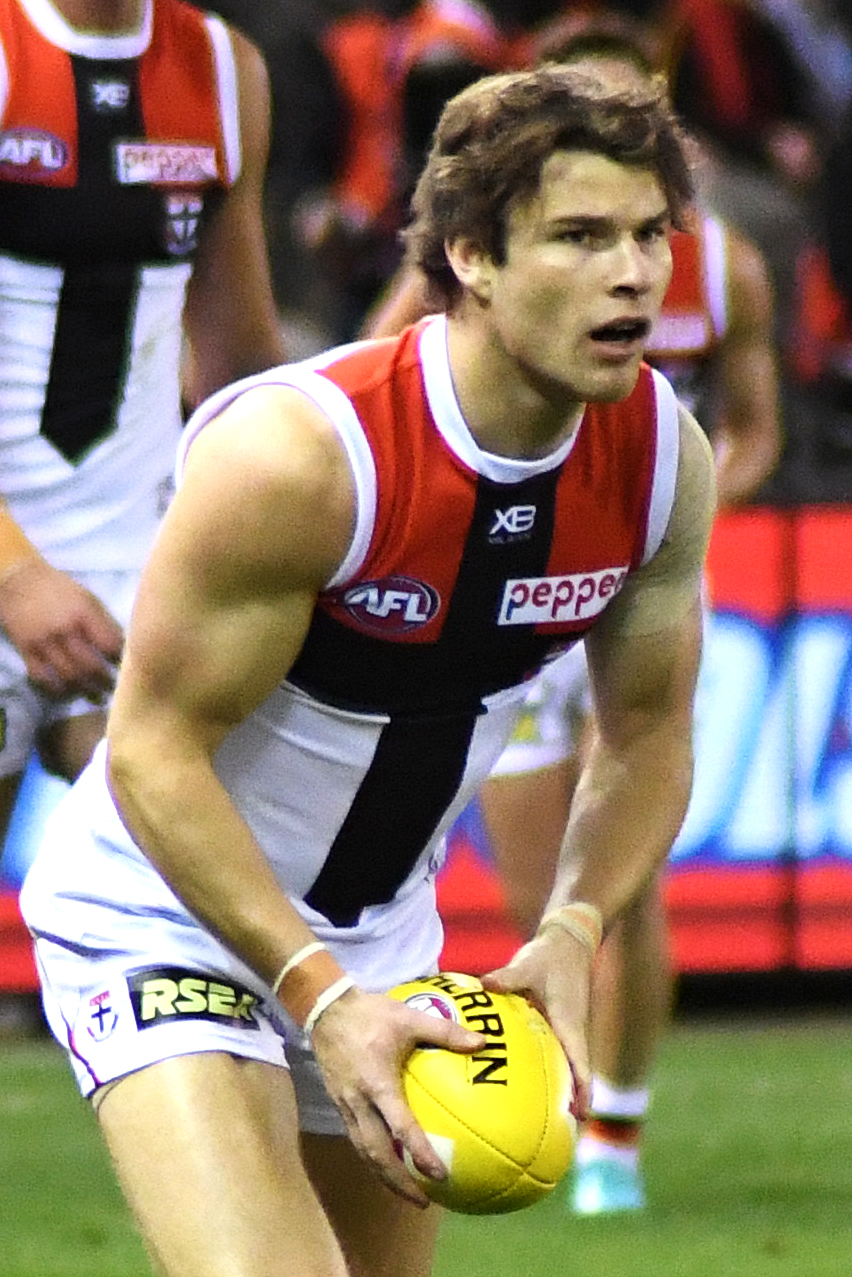
Nathan Freeman, Titans V Rebels

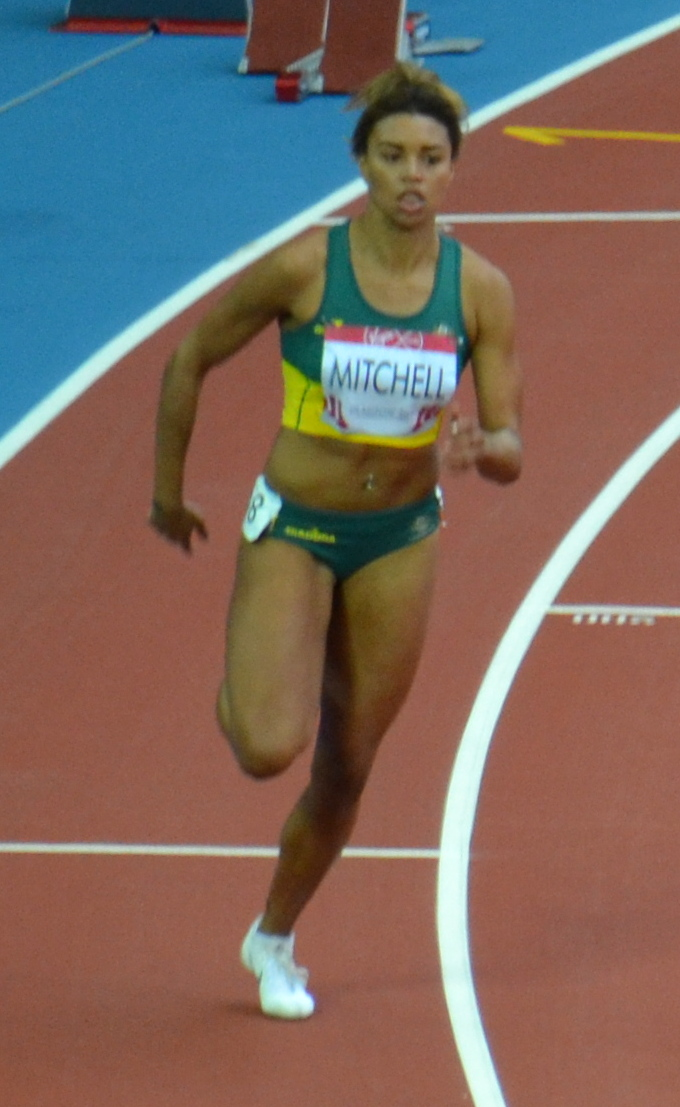
Morgan Mitchell, Brains V Brawn II

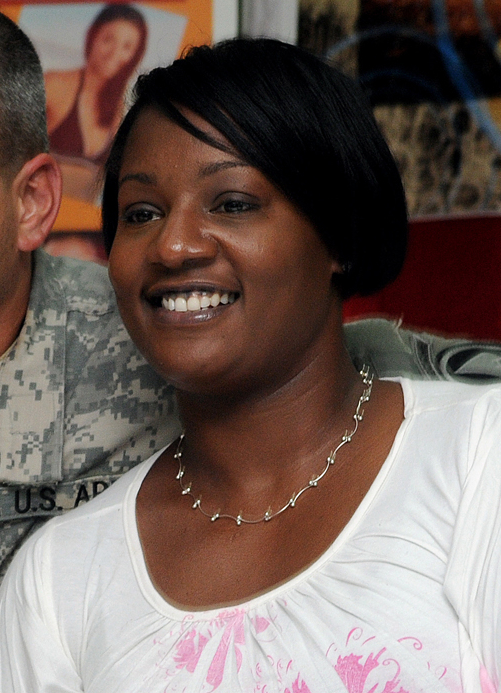
Cirie Fields, Australia V The World

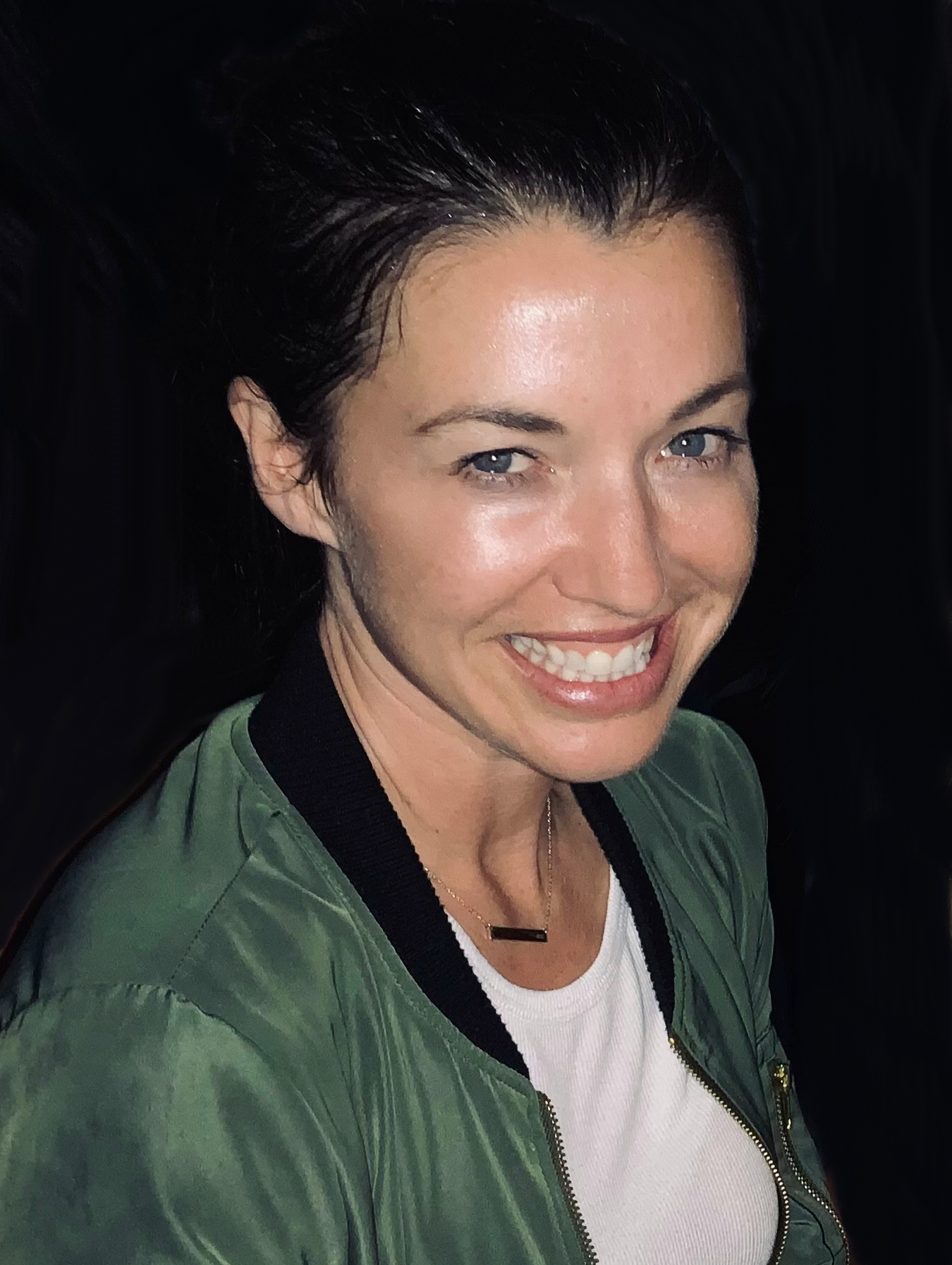
Parvati Shallow, Australia V The World

Name	Age	Hometown	Occupation	Season	Status	Finish
Frankie Guascione	33	Sydney, NSW	Hair Salon Owner	Titans V Rebels	1st Voted Out: Day 2	24th
Jessica Danaher	33	Melbourne, VIC	University Lecturer & Academic	Titans V Rebels	2nd Voted Out: Day 5	23rd
Peta Bennett	33	Perth, WA	Bar Manager	Titans V Rebels	3rd Voted Out: Day 7	22nd
Tobias Grant	41	Byron Bay, NSW	Builder	Titans V Rebels	4th Voted Out: Day 9	21st
Nathan Freeman	28	Melbourne, VIC	AFL Agent	Titans V Rebels	5th Voted Out: Day 14	20th
Viola Jokudu	22	Sydney, NSW	Powerlifter & Coach	Titans V Rebels	6th Voted Out: Day 16	19th
Sarah Moore	24	Newcastle, NSW	Firefighter	Titans V Rebels	7th Voted Out: Day 18	18th
Garrick Wildman	59	Gold Coast, QLD	Loss Prevention Officer	Titans V Rebels	8th Voted Out: Day 20	17th
Charles Noonan	35	Melbourne, VIC	Litigation Lawyer	Titans V Rebels	9th Voted Out: Day 21	16th
Kelli Harris	55	Cairns, QLD	Psychologist	Titans V Rebels	10 Voted Out: Day 25	15th
Scott Butler	31	Hobart, TAS	MONA Art Director	Titans V Rebels	Quit: Day 27	14th
Winna Bhun	25	Sydney, NSW	Competitive Eater, TikToker & Engineer Recruitment	Titans V Rebels	11th Voted Out: Day 29	13th
Eden Porter	39	Melbourne, VIC	Cinema Area Manager	Titans V Rebels	12th Voted Out: Day 31	12th
Aileen Chong	26	Melbourne, VIC	Sales Coordinator & Waitress	Titans V Rebels	13th Voted Out: Day 33	11th
Jaden Laing	27	Upper Coomera, QLD	Security Guard & Strongman	Titans V Rebels	14th Voted Out: Day 35	10th
Valeria Sizova	31	Sydney, NSW	Dance Entertainment Business Owner	Titans V Rebels	15th Voted Out: Day 37	9th
Alex Coe	26	Perth, WA	Maths Teacher	Titans V Rebels	16th Voted Out: Day 39	8th
Rianna Bowley	31	Adelaide, SA	Paramedic	Titans V Rebels	17th Voted Out: Day 41	7th
Kitty Blomfield	42	Gold Coast, QLD	Business Owner	Titans V Rebels	18th Voted Out: Day 42	6th
Kirby Bentley	37	Melbourne, VIC	AFLW Coach, Mining & Shipping Industries	Titans V Rebels	19th Voted Out: Day 44	5th
Raymond Chaney	27	Central Coast, NSW	Retail Worker	Titans V Rebels	20th Voted Out: Day 45	4th
Mark Warnock	35	Townsville, QLD	Former Diplomat	Titans V Rebels	21st Voted Out: Day 46	3rd
Caroline Courtis	55	Melbourne, VIC	Midwife	Titans V Rebels	Runner-up: Day 47	2nd
Feras Basal	28	Sydney, NSW	HR Manager	Titans V Rebels	Sole Survivor: Day 47	1st
Candy Rule	25	Sydney, NSW	Model	Brains V Brawn II	1st Voted Out: Day 2	24th
Indira "Indy" Saleh	45	Townsville, QLD	Business Development Manager	Brains V Brawn II	2nd Voted Out: Day 5	23rd
Zen Heaton	23	Gold Coast, QLD	Hip Hop Artist	Brains V Brawn II	Medically Evacuated: Day 7 ^{‡}	22nd
Kent Miller-Randle	54	Melbourne, VIC	Business Mogul	Brains V Brawn II	3rd Voted Out: Day 7	21st
Nash Gendo	36	Sydney, NSW	Salesman	Brains V Brawn II	4th Voted Out: Day 9	20th
Ally Kettle	31	Goovigen, QLD	AI Expert	Brains V Brawn II	5th Voted Out: Day 14	19th
Rich Hughes	38	Melbourne, VIC	Film Director	Brains V Brawn II	6th Voted Out: Day 16	18th
Ursula Rose	35	Canberra, ACT	Powerlifter	Brains V Brawn II	7th Voted Out: Day 18	17th
Max Wills	28	Gold Coast, QLD	Primary School Teacher	Brains V Brawn II	8th Voted Out: Day 19	16th
Laura Noonan	27	Melbourne, VIC	Footy Fanatic	Brains V Brawn II	9th Voted Out: Day 21	15th
Ben Bylett	45	Sunshine Coast, QLD	Stonemason	Brains V Brawn II	Quit: Day 25	14th
Jesse Noonan	34	Gold Coast, QLD	Pro Skater	Brains V Brawn II	10th Voted Out: Day 28	13th
Paul "PD" Dee	50	Rockdale, NSW	Football Head Coach	Brains V Brawn II	11th Voted Out: Day 29	12th
Laura Darras	25	Melbourne, VIC	Witch	Brains V Brawn II	12th Voted Out: Day 31	11th
Paulie Michael	36	Sydney, NSW	Paramedic	Brains V Brawn II	13th Voted Out: Day 35	10th
Karin Gunatilake	30	Melbourne, VIC	Doctor	Brains V Brawn II	14th Voted Out: Day 37	9th
Logan Johannisen	25	Melbourne, VIC	AFL Wag	Brains V Brawn II	15th Voted Out: Day 39	8th
Kristin Alston	43	Sydney, NSW	Aviation Fire Fighter	Brains V Brawn II	16th Voted Out: Day 41	7th
Morgan Mitchell	30	Melbourne, VIC	Olympic Sprinter	Brains V Brawn II	17th Voted Out: Day 43	6th
Kate Gloufchis	26	Melbourne, VIC	Dancer/DJ	Brains V Brawn II	18th Voted Out: Day 44	5th
Zara Callianiotis	44	Brisbane, QLD	PTA Vice President	Brains V Brawn II	19th Voted Out: Day 45	4th
Alexander "AJ" Antonios	35	Sydney, NSW	Poker Champion	Brains V Brawn II	20th Voted Out: Day 46	3rd
Kaelan Lockhart	27	Brisbane, QLD	PhD Student	Brains V Brawn II	Runner-Up: Day 47	2nd
Myles Kuah	24	Sydney, NSW	Financial Analyst	Brains V Brawn II	Sole Survivor: Day 47	1st
Robert "Rob" Bentele ^{o}	34	Richards Bay, KwaZulu-Natal, South Africa	Events Videographer (Survivor South Africa contestant) (Winner: 7)	Australia V The World	1st Voted Out: Day 2	14th
David Genat ^{†}	44	Perth, WA	International Model	Australia V The World	2nd Voted Out: Day 4	13th
George Mladenov ^{†}	34	Bankstown, NSW	Public Servant	Australia V The World	3rd Voted Out: Day 5	12th
Tony Vlachos ^{o}	51	Allendale, New Jersey, US	Police Officer (American Survivor contestant) (Winner: 28 and 40)	Australia V The World	4th Voted Out: Day 7	11th
Sarah Tilleke ^{^}	29	Sydney, NSW	Model	Australia V The World	5th Voted Out: Day 9	10th
Kirby Bentley ^{^}	38	Melbourne, VIC	AFLW Coach, Mining & Shipping Industries	Australia V The World	6th Voted Out: Day 10	9th
Kassandre Bastarache ^{o}	34	Trois-Rivières, Quebec, Canada	Web Editor (Survivor Québec contestant)	Australia V The World	7th Voted Out: Day 11	8th
Tommi Manninen ^{o}	34	Helsinki, Finland	Radio Presenter (Survivor Finland contestant)	Australia V The World	8th Voted Out: Day 11	7th
Lisa Holmes ^{o}	44	Christchurch, New Zealand	School Librarian (Survivor NZ contestant) (Winner: 2)	Australia V The World	9th Voted Out: Day 13	6th
Shonee Bowtell ^{◊}	32	Noosa, QLD	Personal Assistant	Australia V The World	10th Voted Out: Day 14	5th
Cirie Fields ^{o}	54	Norwalk, Connecticut, US	Surgical Director (American Survivor contestant)	Australia V The World	11th Voted Out: Day 15	4th
Janine Allis^{^}	58	Melbourne, VIC	CEO of Retail Zoo & Boost Juice	Australia V The World	2nd Runner-up: Day 16	3rd
Luke Toki ^{†}	37	Perth, WA	Mining Technician	Australia V The World	Runner-up: Day 16	2nd
Parvati Shallow ^{o}	41	Los Angeles, California, US	Life Coach/Speaker and Yoga Teacher (American Survivor contestant) (Winner: 16)	Australia V The World	Sole Survivor: Day 16	1st
Daniel Lindberg	27	South Hedland, WA	Pastor	Redemption	1st voted out: Day 2	24th
Cat Hooker	41	Melbourne, VIC	Therapist	Redemption	2nd voted out: Day 5	23rd
Eliza Reilly	34	Adelaide, SA	Writer	Redemption	3rd voted out: Day 7	22nd
Paula Drew	33	Perth, WA	Vet Nurse	Redemption	4th voted out: Day 9	21st
Harry Hills ^{†}	36	Perth, WA	Aged Care Dietician	Redemption	5th voted out: Day 11	20th
Johnson Ashak	29	Maroubra, NSW	Civil Structural Engineer	Redemption	6th Voted Out: Day 13	19th
Don Rogers	51	Sydney, NSW	Country Musician	Redemption	7th Voted Out: Day 15	18th
Lyndl Kean	35	Sydney, NSW	Model	Redemption	8th Voted Out: Day 16	17th
Eleftherios "Tez" Vlamis	24	Melbourne, VIC	Law Student	Redemption	9th Voted Out: Day 18	16th
Aisha Washington	29	Brisbane, QLD	NDIS Support Worker	Redemption	10th Voted Out: Day 20	15th
Faith Setiawan	34	Bella Vista, NSW	Chef	Redemption	11th Voted Out: Day 24	14th
Lottie Rae	32	Trangie, NSW	Artist	Redemption	12th Voted Out: Day 26	13th
Richard Skimin	46	Sydney, NSW	CEO	Redemption	13th Voted Out: Day 28	12th
Mark Warnock ^{^}	37	Townsville, QLD	Former Diplomat	Redemption	14th Voted Out: Day 30	11th
Blanche Cruz	47	Gold Coast, QLD	Acupuncturist	Redemption	15th Voted Out: Day 32	10th
Ben Davis	28	Adelaide, SA	AFL Indigenous Talent Lead	Redemption	16th Voted Out: Day 33	9th
Simon Mee ^{†}	35	Brisbane, QLD	Carpenter	Redemption	17th Voted Out: Day 36	8th
Cameron Quashie	26	Melbourne, VIC	MMA Fighter	Redemption	18th Voted Out: Day 38	7th
Brooke Jowett ^{†}	32	Melbourne, VIC	Fitness Professional	Redemption	19th Voted Out: Day 40	6th
Keeley Jenkinson	30	Sunshine Coast, QLD	Fraud Prevention Specialist	Redemption	20th Voted Out: Day 42	5th
Sally Foord	36	Dunsborough, WA	Vintage Clothing Reseller	Redemption	21st Voted Out: Day 43	4th
Lauren "Loz" Mac	46	Maungakotukutuku, NZ	Stay-at-home Mum	Redemption	22nd Voted Out: Day 44	3rd
Jackson Goonrey	24	Sydney, NSW	Pro Wrestler	Redemption	Runner-up: Day 45	2nd
Caleb Beeby	28	Tarwin Lower, VIC	Truck Driver	Redemption	Sole Survivor: Day 45	1st
