= Nice Girls Don't Win =

2025 memoir by Parvati Shallow

- Author: Parvati Shallow
- Audio read by: Parvati Shallow
- Language: English
- Genre: Memoir
- Publisher: The Dial Press
- Publication date: July 8, 2025
- Pages: 256
- ISBN: 9780593730577

Nice Girls Don't Win: How I Burned It All Down to Claim My Power is a 2025 memoir by American television personality Parvati Shallow. The book focuses on Shallow's life; including her upbringing, rise to fame, public image, relationship history, and mental health struggles during the COVID-19 pandemic. It was published by The Dial Press on July 8, 2025.

== Background and conception ==
Parvati Shallow is an American reality television personality. She is known for competing on several seasons of the American reality competition series Survivor. After initially placing sixth on Survivor: Cook Islands in 2006, she returned to compete on Survivor: Micronesia in 2008, winning the game and the prize of US$1,000,000. After winning Micronesia, she returned again on Survivor: Heroes vs. Villains in 2010, finishing as the runner-up, and for a fourth time on Survivor: Winners at War in 2020, placing 15th. Shallow is considered one of the greatest and most iconic Survivor players of all time, gaining a reputation as a "black widow" for using flirtation and seduction as a strategy in the game. After competing on Survivor four times, Shallow made additional television appearances on the second season of The Traitors, the second season of Deal or No Deal Island, and Australian Survivor: Australia V The World.

When I entered the world of reality TV competition at 23 years old, I released control over my own story and I lost myself in the noise for a long time, writing this book in the thick of a difficult divorce helped me reclaim my power by telling my story, my way.

— Parvati Shallow discussing her inspiration for the book.

Shallow announced the book on December 19, 2024. She first revealed the cover to People and explained that she was inspired to write the book to regain control of her personal narrative and public perception, believing her public image had been shaped by disingenuous editing and media portrayals rather than her own voice. Shallow believed that her on-screen persona and reputation helped people "characterize" her, but that the public's perception of her was not accurate and had negatively informed her decision-making in life. Shallow said she now views the "black widow" and villainous roles as personas she can adopt strategically, describing them as costumes she can put on or take off as needed, rather than fixed identities imposed upon her. She wrote it over a two-and-a-half year period, much of which was during the COVID-19 pandemic, a "difficult" period of her life as she was going through a divorce from fellow Survivor alum John Fincher, and grieving the death of her younger brother. When writing the book, Shallow included personal accounts of her brother's death and aspects of her dating life, and expressed concern about how her parents might react to the revelations, noting that she chose to seek their forgiveness rather than their permission. Shallow commented that, while writing, she tried to give readers an unfiltered view of herself, electing to paint herself negatively when suited. She finished writing the book shortly after returning home from competing on Deal or No Deal Island. She detailed that her time on that show influenced her to focus the book's epilogue on it, as the epilogue originally focused on a different subject. Shallow said that the book's writing process changed her as a person, as it allowed her to "reclaim [her] voice".

Shallow titled the book "Nice Girls Don't Win" as a nod to her time on Survivor, where she observed that prioritizing likability over bold strategic play often hindered success. She explained that while kindness comes from authenticity and care, she views "niceness" as people-pleasing behavior aimed at gaining others' approval, which held her back in life and in Survivor. The book's alternate title was "Torched", another reference to Survivor as if a contestant's torch is snuffed on the show, it signifies their elimination. The subtitle, "How I Burned It All Down to Claim My Power", refers to Shallow's decision to divert from societal expectations of women to ensure her own happiness, particularly her decision not to have a nuclear family.

== Synopsis ==
The memoir describes the entirety of Shallow's life, from her birth to her return home from filming Deal or No Deal Island. It documents her journey to self-discovery, from seeking external validation to confidently embracing an authentic, self-directed life. It describes how she recognized and broke free from the expectations placed on her as a woman, wife, and mother, and how she learned to live more authentically and make her own choices. The book also contains interviews with Shallow's parents. Shallow detailed that her life experiences helped "build herself into the ultimate survivor". She added that the book's key theme was that "patterns repeat". Shallow described the book as "intense", "vulnerable" and "intimate", and stated that writing it was the hardest thing she had ever done. It has further been described as a book about empowerment, healing, and self-acceptance.

=== Childhood and upbringing ===
Shallow was raised in a spiritual commune in Florida. In the book, she writes about the commune's "controlling guru", who collected members' money, arranged marriages, devised elaborate plans to take custody of followers' newborn babies, and oversaw punishments for followers who weren't attentive enough during meditations. Shallow describes the communal living conditions as "pure chaos". Shallow believes the environment she grew up in helped prepare her for her eventual success on reality competition shows, particularly by becoming aware of the "fawning" strategy, characterized by excessive people-pleasing and overly complimentary behavior.

Shallow later revealed that the commune was the Kashi Ashram in Sebastian, Florida, let by Ma Jaya (born Joyce Green).

=== Survivor and rise to fame ===
The book details Shallow's stints on Survivor and how she was cast. It explores how Shallow's public image after appearing on Survivor, shaped by the show's edit, contrasted with personal struggles that included a traumatic past, self-doubt, and challenges in her private life, preventing her from being able to enjoy her success and leading to doubts in confidence. She documents her struggles with dating as a result of her portrayal on the show. Her portrayal led to Shallow being slut-shamed by the media for using sexuality as a strategy to advance in the game. The book touches on Shallow's poor financial decisions after winning Micronesia, as well as how being labeled the "black widow" and a betrayer on Survivor affected her personal life and informed her decision-making, and the steps she took to overcome its impact. Shallow mentions her friendship and the fallout of it with fellow Survivor contestant Amanda Kimmel, who she competed with on Micronesia and Heroes vs. Villains.

The book documents Shallow's feelings when looking back on her time competing on Survivor: Heroes vs. Villains. She considers it the hardest season of Survivor she has ever competed on due to being seen as the biggest target after winning Micronesia. She discusses being cast on the "Villains" tribe and making an alliance with Russell Hantz and Danielle DiLorenzo, with the three making it to the merge together against all odds. She then discusses her treatment from those who were originally on the "Heroes" tribe – particularly Amanda Kimmel and Candice Woodcock, whom she had befriended on her previous seasons but now were unwilling to speak to her as they saw her as a target, fueling her desire to eliminate them from the game. Feeling alienated, she recalls being comforted by DiLorenzo. Shallow breaks down her decision to play two hidden immunity idols on Sandra Diaz-Twine and Jerri Manthey at the first Tribal Council after the merge, which is considered one of the best moves in Survivor history, and how it increased her target and threat level in the game. Shallow also describes her feelings during the season's Final Tribal Council, as Kimmel ignored her and Woodcock compared her gameplay to the behavior of a victim in an abusive relationship, words which Shallow believes were out of line and intentionally hurtful. She ultimately believes the season's jury used their speeches to enact vengeance against her for eliminating them, rather than to critique her gameplay.

=== Marriage, giving birth, and divorce ===
The book is partly dedicated to Shallow's marriage and eventual divorce from fellow Survivor contestant John Fincher. Shallow compares their marriage to a cult in the book, and believes marriage reflects patriarchal dynamics that can trap women in a false sense of safety by prioritizing obedience and dependence over personal autonomy. Shallow writes about how she made the difficult decision to leave Fincher shortly after he had received a stage 4 cancer diagnosis. She believes both herself and Fincher were mutually responsible for the breakdown of the relationship, and that in most cases, both members of a romantic couple are partly responsible if the relationship ends. The book also details Shallow's experience giving birth to a daughter.

=== COVID-19 pandemic and coming out ===
During the COVID-19 pandemic, Shallow's younger brother died of a drug overdose, which the book details. The book cites her marriage and divorce from Fincher and the death of her younger brother as key turning points in her life that led her to self-reflection and growth. During the pandemic, she learned that she didn't need to conform to others' expectations of her.

The book further details Shallow's coming out as queer, and her first queer relationship with non-binary comedian Mae Martin after the divorce.

=== Further reality endeavors and epilogue ===
The book includes anecdotes about Shallow's time on Survivor and The Traitors. Its epilogue focuses on Shallow's return home from playing Deal or No Deal Island. The book details how Shallow learned to adopt and shed the "black widow" and villain personas popularized by her reality TV appearances, describing her experience on The Traitors as a test of her ability to maintain her sense of self while embracing these roles on her own terms.

== Release and promotion ==
The memoir was released on July 8, 2025. It was agented by Monika Verman at Levine Greenberg Rostan and published through The Dial Press. It is 256 pages long.

Shallow and reality TV producer Amy Bean launched a companion podcast to the book, which interviewed people who are considered to have attained a high level of self-understanding or accomplishment. Shallow confirmed she would do a book tour for promotion. She detailed they would involve signings, speeches, meet and greets, and readings throughout the USA and Australia.

== Reception ==
Publishers Weekly described the book as a "treat for reality TV fans" and praised Shallow as a "charming, candid narrator".
