= David Genat =

Australian television personality (born 1982)

- Born: 13 March 1980 (age 46); Perth, Western Australia, Australia
- Occupation: Television personality
- Television: Search for a Supermodel; Australian Survivor: Champions V Contenders II; Australian Survivor: All Stars; The Celebrity Apprentice Australia; Deal or No Deal Island; Australian Survivor: Australia V The World
- Spouses: Pearl Christensen
- Children: 4

David Genat (born 13 March 1980) is an Australian television personality, having appeared as a contestant on three seasons of the reality game show Australian Survivor. He was the winner of the A$500,000 prize Australian Survivor: All Stars, having previously competed in Australian Survivor: Champions V Contenders II in which he placed tenth.

In 2025, he competed on the second season of the American series Deal or No Deal Island in which he won the game and a prize of $US5,800,000, making him the biggest game show winner in the history of American television. (Note: For the purposes of this article, a traditional game show is defined as a televised contest in which prizes can be won within a single episode through objective completion of tasks and not through fan or contestant votes. Shows on YouTube channels or any other means of social media count as a reality show and not a game show. Thus, the $10,000,000 prize won by Jeffrey Randall Allen in Beast Games is not counted, while Deal or No Deal Island is a combination of a traditional game show and reality competition (unlike Survivor).)

Genat returned to compete in his third season of Australian Survivor, Survivor: Australia V The World, which began airing in August 2025.

== Australian Survivor ==
In 2019, Genat appeared on Australian Survivor: Champions V Contenders II. He was the 14th voted out on Day 34 and 2nd member of the jury, placing 10th.

In 2020, Genat returned the next season on Australian Survivor: All Stars. He was voted sole survivor on Day 50.

In 2025, Genat returned for a third time to compete on Survivor: Australia V The World. The full cast was officially announced on 13 April 2025, with the first preview airing that night along with the penultimate episode of Australian Survivor: Brains V Brawn II. He was the 2nd voted out on Day 5, placing 13th.

On 18 August 2025, Genat announced that he would be the new host for Australian Survivor, starting from 2026.

== Other reality shows ==
In 2002, Genat was the winner of the third season of Australian model search show Search for a Supermodel, competing in a field of both male and female modelling hopefuls.

Genat appeared on The Celebrity Apprentice Australia in 2020.

Genat also appeared on the second season of Deal or No Deal Island, alongside four time Survivor contestant and Survivor US: Micronesia winner Parvati Shallow and Big Brother US 2 winner Will Kirby. He won the show and played a high-stakes game of Deal or No Deal to determine his prize. He was offered $US5,800,000 to walk away, which he accepted, when the remaining cases left were $75 and $12,232,001; this makes Genat the first non-American game show contestant to be placed in the American top 25 game show winners list. Genat ultimately made a good deal, as his case contained $75 (which is what he would have walked away with had he continued his game).

== Personal life ==
Genat is married to fitness coach Pearl Christensen, with whom he shares a daughter. Genat also shares two sons from a previous relationship, Kathleen Genat, and is also a stepfather to Christensen's eldest daughter from a former relationship.

== Filmography ==
=== Television ===
Year	Title	Role	Notes
2021–present	Getaway	Guest host	
2023	Rush	Host	
2026	Australian Survivor	Host	Season 14–present

=== Reality Competition ===
Year	Title	Role	Notes
2002	Search for a Supermodel	Contestant	Winner
2019	Australian Survivor: Champions V Contenders	Contestant	10th Place
2020	Australian Survivor: All Stars	Contestant	Winner
2021	The Celebrity Apprentice Australia	Contestant	8th Place
2025	Deal or No Deal Island 2	Contestant	Winner
2025	Survivor: Australia V The World	Contestant	13th Place

== Notes ==
Preceded by Pia Miranda	Winner of Australian Survivor; Australian Survivor: All Stars	Succeeded by Hayley Leake
Preceded by Jordan Fowler	Winner of Deal or No Deal Island; Deal or No Deal Island 2	Succeeded by --
