= Parvati Shallow =

American television personality (born 1982)

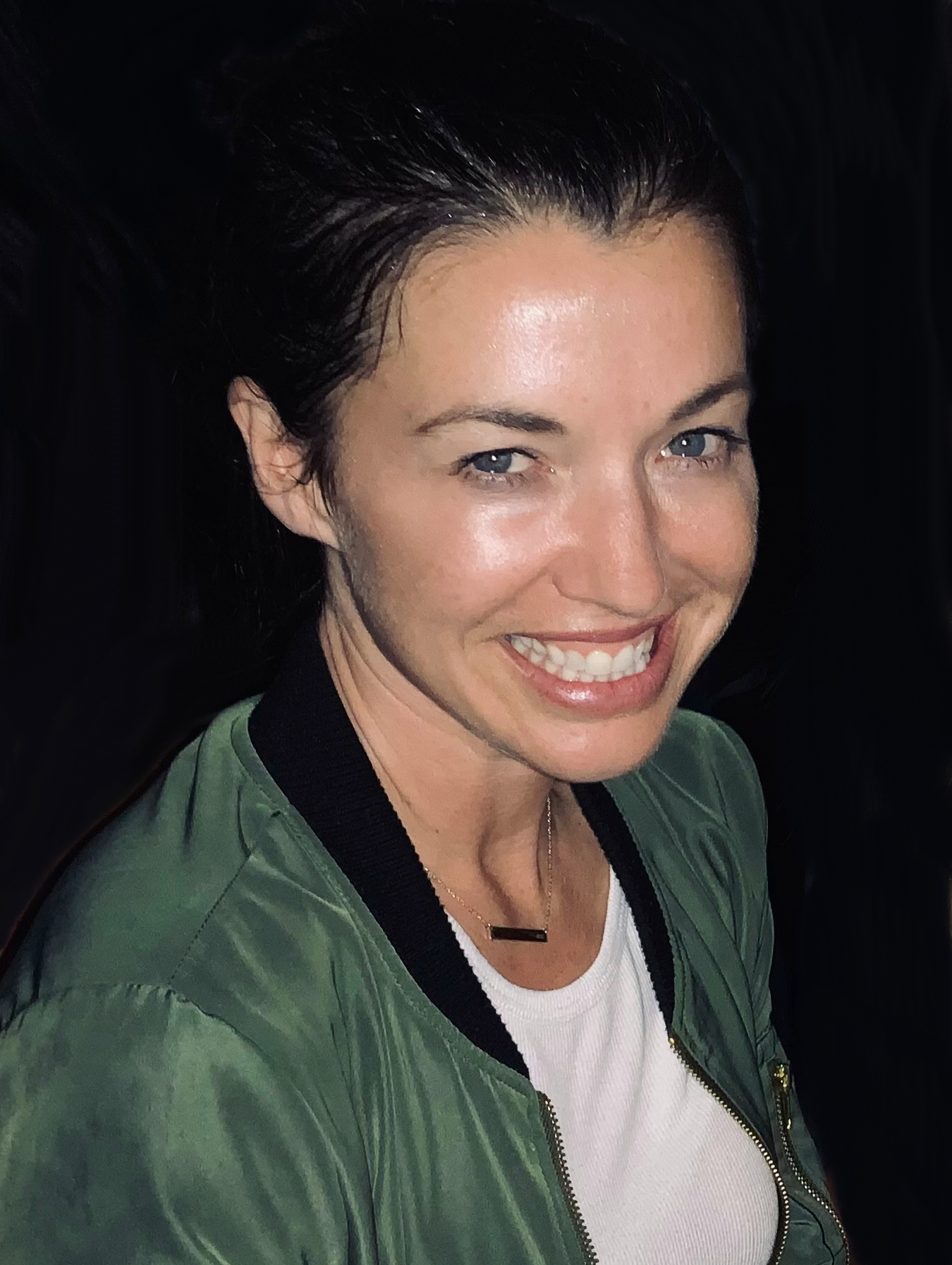
- Shallow in 2020
- Born: September 21, 1982 (age 44); Vero Beach, Florida, U.S.
- Education: University of Georgia (ABJ)
- Occupations: Television personality; yoga teacher; internet talk show host; charity organizer
- Television: Survivor: Cook Islands; Survivor: Micronesia (Winner); Survivor: Heroes vs. Villains (2nd); Survivor: Winners at War; The Traitors 2 Deal or No Deal Island 2 Survivor: Australia V The World (Winner)
- Spouses: John Fincher (m. 2017; div. 2021)
- Partner: Mae Martin (2023–2024)
- Children: 1

Parvati Shallow (/ˈpɑːrvətiː/ PARV-ə-tee; born September 21, 1982) is an American television personality, best known for competing on multiple seasons of the reality game show Survivor and being a two-time Survivor winner—first winning Survivor: Micronesia–Fans vs. Favorites in 2008, and then while representing the USA on the Australia V The World season of Australian Survivor in 2025. She first appeared on Survivor: Cook Islands 2006, in which she placed 6th, and also participated in Survivor: Heroes vs. Villains in 2010, placing 2nd and on Survivor: Winners at War in 2020, in which she placed 15th.

Shallow gained the nickname "Black Widow" due to her strategic gameplay on Survivor, particularly using her sociability and flirtation to gain allies and subtly control the game. The nickname followed her to other reality show appearances, including The Traitors 2 and Deal or No Deal Island 2. Beyond embracing it for television, Shallow has used the moniker in her role as a life coach—notably in her course How Villains are Made, which focuses on personal empowerment topics. She is also the author of Nice Girls Don't Win which describes her reality-show history.

== Early life ==
Shallow was born on September 21, 1982, in Vero Beach, Florida. She was raised in the Kashi Ashram in Sebastian, Florida, led by Ma Jaya (born Joyce Green), which she described as "high-control" and a "cult." She also revealed that Green is the one that named her Parvati, as she named all children born into the commune.

Shallow and her three siblings moved to Marietta, Georgia when she was 11 years old, where she graduated from Sprayberry High School. She later attended the University of Georgia where she was a member of the Alpha Omicron Pi sorority and received a Bachelor of Journalism (ABJ) degree.

In 2003, Shallow auditioned for the MTV reality series The Real World but was not cast.

Shallow began competing in boxing in 2004. She and some fellow boxers created a non-profit organization titled "Knockouts for Girls", a charity that provides scholarships and boxing lessons for underprivileged girls.

Prior to appearing on Survivor, Shallow relocated from Georgia to West Hollywood, California.

== Survivor ==
Shallow originally auditioned for The Amazing Race along with her friend. They did not make the final cut. CBS producers, however, remembered her from her auditions and then approached her to take part in Survivor, which she accepted.

=== Cook Islands ===
Shallow originally appeared as part of the Rarotonga (Raro) tribe, which represented Caucasians, along with Adam Gentry, Jonathan Penner, Jessica "Flicka" Smith, and Candice Woodcock. Her tribe did not face any danger for the first six days as they had won immunity. At the end of the second immunity challenge, Billy Garcia of the Aitutaki (Aitu) tribe told Shallow and Woodcock that he was next to go. Woodcock replied, "We love you," and Garcia believed that Woodcock had fallen in love with him. Shallow was particularly allied with Gentry and Woodcock, who truly were romantically involved. When the four tribes were merged into two, Shallow and Gentry remained in Raro while their other tribe mates were sent to Aitu. Despite being stronger in number, the new Raro continually lost in challenges. Shallow pressed for the elimination of J. P. Calderon, who she thought was arrogant, and he became the fourth person voted out despite his physical strength. Shallow survived her tribe's next three Tribal Councils as Calderon, Stephannie Favor, and Cristina Coria were each voted off. When the contestants were down to 12, a "Mutiny" twist was presented where anybody could change tribe affiliations, and for the first time it was accepted. Shallow's former tribe mates Penner and Woodcock decided to jump back to Raro. Raro lost the next two Immunity challenges, but Shallow remained loyal to her original Raro tribemates by eliminating Brad Virata, Rebecca Borman, and Jenny Guzon-Bae.

At the merge, despite coming with a 5–4 member advantage over Aitu, Shallow found herself in the minority as Penner betrayed his former tribe mates and joined the Aitu Four in voting out Nate Gonzalez. She became angry with Penner, and a day after his betrayal, when she cut her thumb with a machete while cutting a coconut, she said that she was imagining the coconut was Penner's head. After alliance member Woodcock was eliminated, Shallow and Gentry found themselves fighting for survival. Despite being on the outside, Shallow was able to retain her strength and win two reward challenges, one being the "loved one" challenge. This worried the Aitu Four, who were dissatisfied with how Gentry and Shallow lay around camp sleeping while they worked and got their food. In an attempt to stay in the game, Gentry and Shallow talked to Yul Kwon about voting out Penner first in exchange for their jury votes, a plan which succeeded. On day 36, Shallow was finally voted out in a 4–2 vote when the Aitu Four saw her craftiness as more of a threat than Gentry's physical strength. As a juror, she cast her vote for eventual runner-up Ozzy Lusth, who lost to Kwon in a 5-4-0 vote.

Shallow was noted for being a flirt throughout the season. She flirted with Gonzalez to ensure his loyalty, had 'cuddle sessions' with Gentry, and sat naked in a hot tub with Kwon and Lusth (both also naked) during a challenge reward.

=== Micronesia ===
Shallow returned as a "Favorite" and part of the Malakal tribe. She formed a close bond with James Clement and the two formed an alliance with another couple consisting of Amanda Kimmel and Ozzy Lusth. After their tribe lost the first Immunity Challenge, they tried swinging Jonny Fairplay over to their side to gain a majority over the alliance of Yau-Man Chan, Ami Cusack, Eliza Orlins, and Jonathan Penner. However, Fairplay was voted out instead as per his wishes, since he was aching to return home to his pregnant girlfriend. Shallow then made a pact with Cirie Fields to go all the way to the Final Three with Kimmel. After losing the third Immunity Challenge, Shallow was targeted by the opposing alliance, but her own alliance (now with Fields) succeeded in voting off strategic threat Chan.

At the tribal switch, Shallow and Clement were separated from their alliance as they moved to Airai. However, she remained safe as her tribe won the remaining tribal Immunity Challenges. On day 20, she made a deal with Natalie Bolton for an alliance with Clement and Alexis Jones, plus a Final Four deal with Jones and Kimmel; Bolton accepted both deals.

At the merge, Shallow found herself in a good position as she was allied with six (Jones, Kimmel, Fields, Bolton, Lusth, Clement) of the nine people left. During the tenth Immunity Challenge, Shallow convinced Jason Siska to step down from the challenge so that she could win Immunity, which worked (under the condition that the tribe would not vote off Siska). However, her "Couples Alliance" decided to go back on their word and they targeted Siska. However, Fields saw this as an opportunity to blindside physical threat Lusth instead, and she needed Shallow's help for it to work. Shallow agreed to this and recruited her Airai female allies Bolton and Jones to the plan, and Lusth was voted off 5–4. Afterward, Shallow found herself in a failed attempt to patch things up with Clement and Kimmel (who kept her distrust to herself). The five remaining women then formed an alliance to vote off the men, starting with Siska. However, when Clement was evacuated and Erik Reichenbach won Immunity, they were forced to vote off one of their own. Kimmel was the intended target, a plan of which Shallow did not want any part. So she helped Kimmel find the Hidden Immunity Idol (which was buried under the tribal flag) and together, they voted off possible jury threat Jones.

Shallow made it all the way to the Final Three with Fields and Kimmel (as promised). However, she was heartbroken to learn that only two of them would face the jury. She was eliminated first at the Final Immunity Challenge but was chosen to be in the Final Two by Kimmel as Kimmel felt that Fields would be extremely tough to beat at the Final Tribal Council. At the Final Tribal Council, Shallow convinced the jury to vote for her because of her aggressive game play compared to her previous season. Despite being accused of being a mean person by Orlins and a backstabber by Lusth, the jury decided to award Shallow the title of Sole Survivor with a close vote of 5–3, getting votes from Orlins, Siska, Jones, Bolton, and Fields.

=== Heroes vs. Villains ===
Shallow returned to play Survivor for a third time as a part of the Villains tribe. She quickly accepted an alliance with Russell Hantz and Danielle DiLorenzo. On day 18, the Villains lost immunity, and the alliance of Shallow, Hantz, and DiLorenzo were still struggling to gain control of the game. They finally gained control when they persuaded Jerri Manthey to switch sides and vote out Hantz's rival, Rob Mariano. Because the Villains had yet to vote out a female member at that point in the game, the Heroes assumed that the Villains tribe was being run by an all-women alliance, led by Shallow. When the Villains lost immunity again on day 21, they decided to further confirm the Heroes' belief of that, by voting out Benjamin "Coach" Wade. Shallow and DiLorenzo both found the hidden immunity idol together and decided not to tell Hantz. On day 24, the Villains lost immunity again and James "J. T." Thomas Jr. gave his idol to Hantz, in hopes that he would use it to vote out Shallow. Hantz, however, showed it to Shallow, along with DiLorenzo and Manthey.

On day 25, the Heroes and Villains merged into Yin Yang and went to live at the old Heroes camp. Shallow and Hantz came up with this story that they both played their idol, negating all votes, and that in the re-vote, they eliminated Courtney Yates. The new tribe quickly alienated Shallow, making her swear to get revenge on all of the Heroes. For the immunity challenge on day 27, she and DiLorenzo were the last two remaining. Shallow decided to concede immunity, because she already had one idol. Before Tribal Council, Hantz gave her his idol, as well. She then went and talked to Kimmel, who warned that Shallow should play the idol for herself. But at Tribal Council, Shallow, not trusting Kimmel's warning, played both idols on Sandra Diaz-Twine and Manthey, sending Thomas home in a 5–0 vote.

On day 33, Hantz won immunity, and decided to turn on his alliance. He tried to pit Shallow and DiLorenzo against each other, but failed. He then aligned with the Heroes to vote DiLorenzo out, and with some help from Manthey, DiLorenzo was voted out in a 4–3 vote. He then aligned with the Heroes again and decided to target Shallow. However, his plan was ruined when she won immunity on day 36. Shallow then won her third challenge on day 37, and they voted the last Hero, Colby Donaldson, out of the game in a 4–1 vote. After Shallow failed to win the final immunity challenge, it seemed that she would be voted out, since everyone wanted her gone. She, on the other hand, wanted to get rid of Diaz-Twine, thinking she would get a lot of votes in the end. However, the four remaining players voted out Manthey in a 3–1 vote; Hantz had believed he would get her vote to win Sole Survivor.

In the end, Shallow came in second, gaining the jury votes of fellow Villains Wade, DiLorenzo, and Manthey. She beat out Hantz, who received zero votes, but was defeated by Diaz-Twine, who got the votes of all the Heroes, plus Yates, who was in an alliance with Diaz-Twine while still in the game. By the end of Heroes vs. Villains, Shallow had played a total of 114 days on Survivor, the most at that time.

=== Winners at War ===
Shallow once again returned to compete on the show's 40th season, Survivor: Winners at War. She was a member of the Sele tribe and aligned with fellow old schoolers Boston Rob Mariano, Ethan Zohn, and Danni Boatwright. However, when Sele lost immunity on day 6, Boatwright felt betrayed by Shallow and told Mariano to target Shallow instead of one of the new school players. Mariano told Shallow this plan, and Boatwright was voted out unanimously. Shallow was able to survive a few more votes until the tribe swap. After the swap, she remained on Sele along with former Sele member Michele Fitzgerald and three former Dakal members—Yul Kwon, Nick Wilson, and Wendell Holland. After losing the second immunity challenge as new tribes, Shallow found herself in the minority along with Fitzgerald. She was unsuccessful in convincing Wilson to flip. She was voted out in episode 6 in a 3–2 vote, becoming the seventh person sent to the Edge of Extinction, and making this the first time she was voted out since Cook Islands 26 seasons and 13 years prior. She bequeathed her fire tokens to Fitzgerald. Shallow's journey for this season came to an end on day 35 after losing the chance to re-enter the game in the second and final Edge of Extinction challenge. As a juror, she cast her vote for eventual runner-up Natalie Anderson, who lost to Tony Vlachos in a 12-4-0 vote.

=== Australia V The World ===
In 2025, Shallow competed on the world tribe of Survivor: Australia V The World, joining representatives from other versions of Survivor in competing against a tribe of former Australian Survivor contestants . On the World tribe, she was joined by fellow Americans including two-time winner Tony Vlachos and her fellow Micronesia Black Widow ally, Cirie Fields.

On Day 1, she approached Survivor South Africa: Island of Secrets winner, Rob Bentele, after he talked with two-time Australian Survivor player and Shallow's Deal or No Deal Island ally, David Genat, during the opening challenge. She proposed working with Bentele and admitted her past experience with Genat. However, after Bentele showed interest in voting off one of the Americans, Shallow and Fields rallied their tribemates to vote out the South African 6–1, but not before he disclosed Shallow's Deal or No Deal Island history to the World Tribe.

Shallow proceeded to win the final immunity challenge, securing her place in the final tribal council–making her the first person in Survivor history to make it to the final tribal three times. On the Final Day of the game, she won in a 6-1-0 Jury Vote, winning the A$250,000 prize. During her final words, she celebrated winning in Samoa, after finishing as the runner-up on the previous Samoa-filmed seasons, Heroes v. Villains and announced her retirement from Survivor.

=== Legacy ===
Shallow is one of only three two-time American Survivor winners worldwide alongside Sandra Diaz-Twine and Tony Vlachos. Additionally, she is the first person to make it to the final tribal council three times. With 165 days played over five seasons, Shallow has played more days than any other Survivor contestant in the world. She overtook the previous record holder in "Boston" Rob Mariano's 152 days after participating in Australia v. the World.

Shallow was one of the first five inductees into the "Survivor Hall of Fame" in the year 2010, alongside Hantz, Mariano, Diaz-Twine, and Richard Hatch. She is also one of only ten players to make it to Final Tribal Council more than once, along with Hantz, Mariano, Diaz-Twine, Kimmel, Fitzgerald, Anderson, Tony Vlachos, Joe Hunter and Aubry Bracco. Reality TV podcaster and former Survivor contestant Rob Cesternino twice conducted online polls (in 2011 and 2014) for the greatest contestant in the show's history; Shallow won both times the poll was held.

In the official issue of CBS Watch commemorating the 15th anniversary of Survivor, Shallow was voted by viewers as the fourth greatest contestant in the history of the series (only behind Cesternino, Hantz, and Mariano), and was the highest-ranking female contestant. Also, she was the only three-time contestant in the top ten to have all three of her seasons also be ranked by viewers as among the top ten greatest seasons of all time—Cook Islands was ranked tenth, Micronesia was ranked third, and Heroes vs. Villains was ranked first. In addition, she came in second in the same magazine's poll for the most attractive female contestant, only behind Brenda Lowe of Survivor: Nicaragua and Survivor: Caramoan. Accordingly, Shallow was the only female contestant to appear in both polls, and one of only two contestants overall to appear in the "greatest players" poll and one of the "most attractive" polls, the other being Lusth, her fellow Cook Islands and Micronesia player. In 2017, Entertainment Weekly had fans of the series rank the 34 winners and Shallow came in 1st place.

In 2015, host Jeff Probst named Shallow one of his top ten favorite Survivor winners, and one of his top four favorite female winners. In 2020, before the premiere of Winners at War, Probst named Shallow the best winner ever.

== Other reality shows ==
Shallow appeared on the second season of The Traitors, where she was chosen as the third Traitor. She appears alongside fellow Survivor alumni, Sandra Diaz-Twine. Shallow was the second traitor banished after Dan Gheesling.

She competed on the second season of Deal or No Deal Island, alongside Australian Survivor: All Stars winner David Genat & Big Brother 2 winner Will Kirby. Shallow and Genat reunited on Survivor: Australia V The World.

== Personal life ==
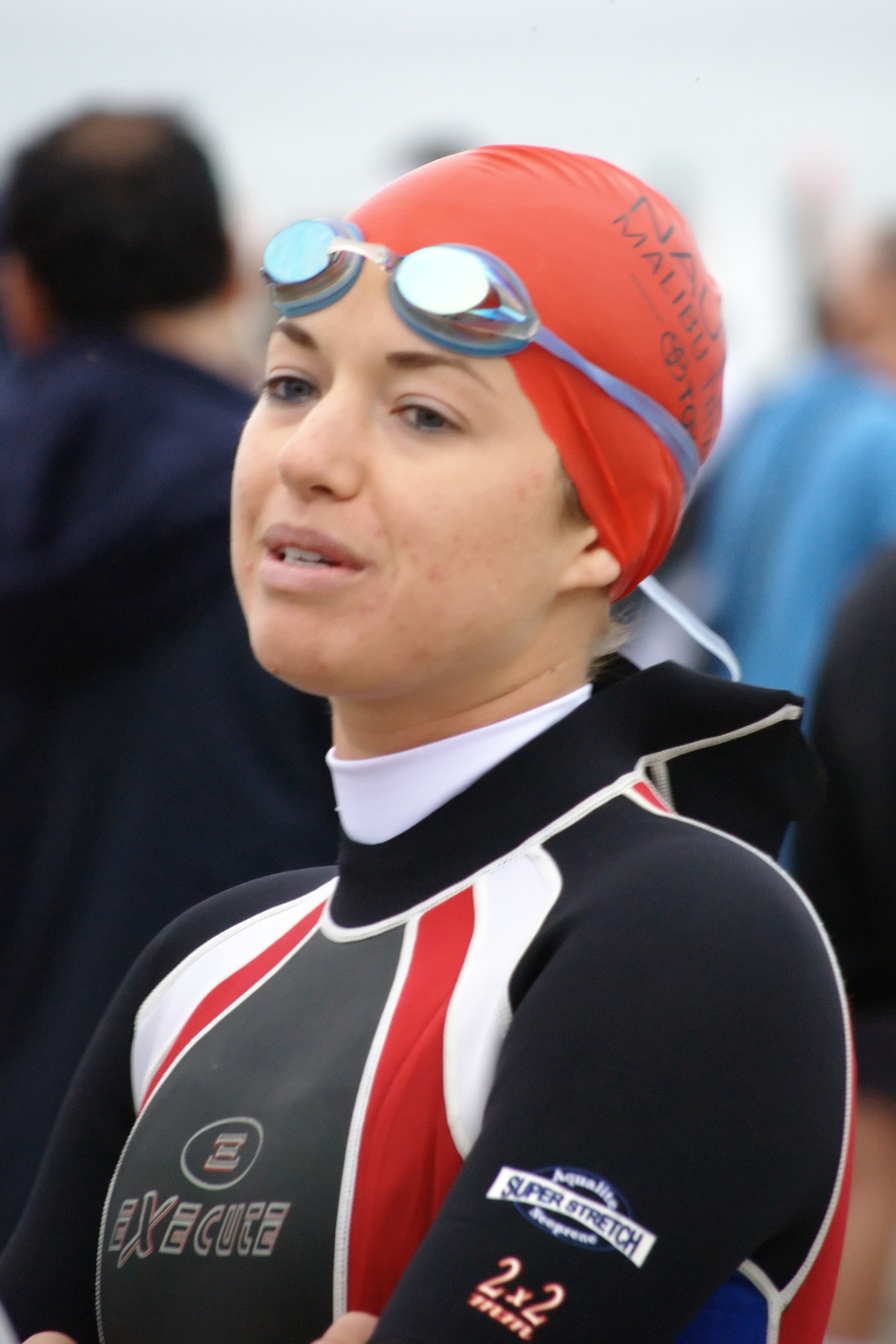
Shallow at the 2008 Nautica Triathlon Malibu Individual Open

In 2009, Shallow and fellow Survivor contestant Amanda Kimmel made an appearance in the movie Into the Blue 2. Shallow hosted the third season of the webseries Around the World For Free, which began airing on July 5, 2011.

In 2014, Shallow began dating fellow Survivor alum John Fincher, who competed on Survivor: Samoa. They announced their engagement in January 2017 and married on July 16, 2017. They had a daughter. In August 2021, Shallow filed for divorce from Fincher after four years of marriage. It was later revealed that Shallow had obtained a temporary domestic violence restraining order against Fincher. She divorced Fincher some time later.

Shallow resides in Los Angeles, California and is a yoga teacher.

In 2020, Shallow co-authored a children's book about mindfulness titled Om the Otter.

On December 30, 2023, Shallow came out as queer in an Instagram post and announced she was in a relationship with non-binary comedian and writer Mae Martin. She told People magazine in January 2025 that their relationship was in "an in flux situation."

== Filmography ==
=== Film ===
Year	Title	Role	Notes
2009	Into the Blue 2: The Reef	Parvati	Direct-to-video

=== Television ===
Year	Title	Role	Notes
2011	Around the World for Free	Host	Season 3
2013–14	Survivor Live	Host	Survivor: Caramoan, Survivor: Blood vs. Water, and Survivor: Cagayan
2014	Survivor: Cagayan	Guest	Episode 14: "Reunion Special"
2024	Dirty Laundry	Guest	Season 4: "Who Was Part of a Ritual to Ward Off Evil Spirits?"
2025	The Traitors 3	Mission co-host	With Kate Chastain

=== Reality Competition ===
Year	Title	Role	Notes
2006	Survivor: Cook Islands	Contestant	6th Place
2008	Survivor: Micronesia — Fans vs. Favorites	Contestant	Winner
2010	Survivor: Heroes vs. Villains	Contestant	Runner-up
2020	Survivor: Winners at War	Contestant	15th Place
2024	The Traitors 2	Contestant - Traitor	11th Place
2025	Deal or No Deal Island 2	Contestant	4th Place
2025	Survivor: Australia V The World	Contestant	Winner

Preceded by Todd Herzog	Winner of Survivor; Survivor: Micronesia	Succeeded by Robert "Bob" Crowley
Preceded by Russell Hantz	Runner-Up of Survivor; Survivor: Heroes vs. Villains	Succeeded by Chase Rice
Preceded by Myles Kuah	Winner of Australian Survivor; Australia V The World	Succeeded by Caleb Beeby
