= Survivor NZ: Thailand =

- Season 2
- Presented by: Matt Chisholm
- No. of days: 39
- No. of castaways: 18
- Winner: Lisa Stanger
- Runner-up: Theresa "Tess" Fahey
- Location: Khao Laem National Park, Thailand
- No. of episodes: 15

Release
- Original network: TVNZ 2
- Original release: April 22 – July 29, 2018

Additional information
- Filming dates: January 2018 – March 2018

Season chronology
- ← Previous; Survivor NZ: Nicaragua

Survivor NZ: Thailand was the second and final season of Survivor NZ, a television series based on the popular reality game show Survivor. This season took place in Khao Laem National Park in Thailand. Here, 18 contestants fought to survive for 39 days to try and win $250,000.

This season featured several alterations from the previous season, Survivor NZ: Nicaragua. The cash prize was increased from $100,000 to $250,000 and Redemption Island — which allowed voted out contestants to return to the game — was removed. This season also introduced hidden immunity idols, small trinkets that, when played on a castaway after the votes were cast at Tribal Council but before they were read, negated all votes cast against them at that Tribal Council, and the Outpost, where tribal representatives were to compete in head-to-head competitions for rewards and tote.

== Contestants ==
Two of the eighteen contestants — Francesca "Franky" March and Kaysha Whakarau — were chosen by fans in wildcard competitions hosted by The Hits radio station. Notably, in the premiere episode, it was revealed that David "Dave" Lipanovic and Matthew "Matt" Hancock were friends and had attended high school together.

List of Survivor NZ: Thailand contestants
Contestant	Original Tribe	Swapped Tribe	Merged Tribe	Finish
Josefien "Jose" Maasdam; 23, Blenheim	Chani			1st voted out Day 3
Karla Karaitiana; 37, Palmerston North	Chani			2nd voted out Day 6
Francky March; 24, Auckland	Chani			3rd voted out Day 9
Kaysha Whakarau; 24, Shannon	Khangkhaw			4th voted out Day 12
Liam Hose; 23, Tauranga	Chani	Khangkhaw		5th voted out Day 15
Josh Hickford; 28, New Plymouth	Khangkhaw	Chani		6th voted out Day 18
Jeremy "JT" Muirhead; 32, Ashhurst	Chani	Khangkhaw		Quit; Day 21
Dylan Conrad; 26, Whangārei	Khangkhaw	Chani		7th voted out Day 21
Arun Bola; 30, Hamilton	Chani	Chani	Phsan	8th voted out 1st jury member Day 24
Brad Norris; 27, Nelson	Khangkhaw	Khangkhaw	Phsan	9th voted out 2nd jury member Day 27
Renee Clarke; 28, Auckland	Chani	Chani	Phsan	10th voted out 3rd jury member Day 29
Eve Clarke; 26, Auckland	Chani	Khangkhaw	Phsan	11th voted out 4th jury member Day 31
Matt Hancock; 25, Auckland	Khangkhaw	Chani	Phsan	12th voted out 5th jury member Day 33
Adam O'Brien; 28, Auckland	Khangkhaw	Chani	Phsan	13th voted out 6th jury member Day 36
Tara Thorowgood; 44, Hamilton	Khangkhaw	Khangkhaw	Phsan	14th voted out 7th jury member Day 38
Dave Lipanovic; 26, Auckland	Chani	Chani	Phsan	2nd runner-up
Theresa "Tess" Fahey; 24, Christchurch	Khangkhaw	Khangkhaw	Phsan	Runner-up
Lisa Stanger; 38, Christchurch	Khangkhaw	Khangkhaw	Phsan	Sole Survivor

=== Future Appearances ===
Lisa Stanger would compete again, representing New Zealand on Australian Survivor: Australia V The World in 2025.

Outside of Survivor, Adam O’Brien would appear on Treasure Island: Fans V Faves.

== Season summary ==
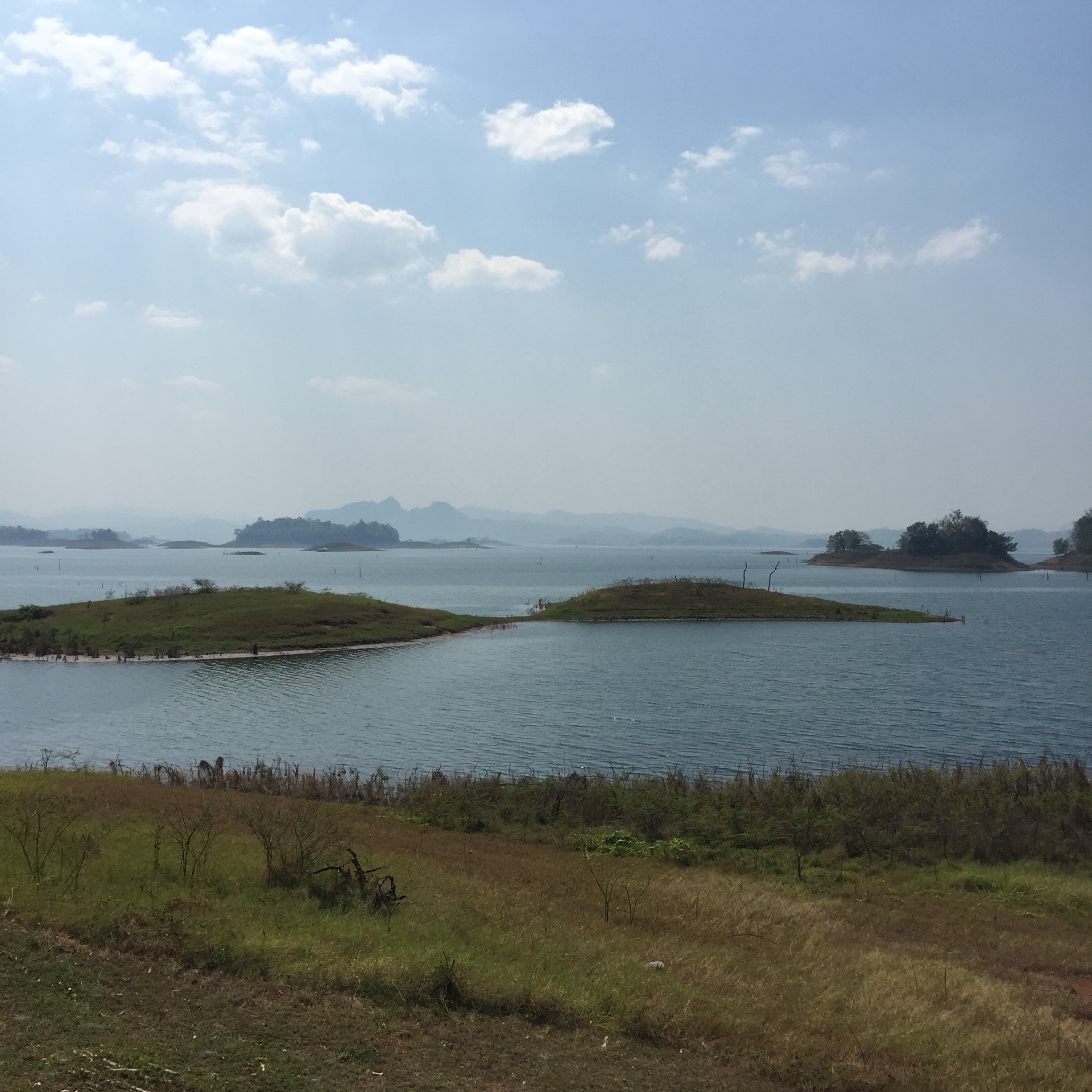
The season filmed in Khao Laem National Park in Thailand.

Eighteen new castaways arrived in Thailand and were divided into two tribes of nine: Chani and Khangkhaw. Chani proved to be inefficient in challenges whilst Khangkhaw dominated (though their members frequently bickered amongst themselves). After a tribe swap, JT's health started to deteriorate, and he opted to pull himself from the game as the new Khangkhaw and Chani tribes took opportunities to vote out newer members of their groups in an effort to retain a majority at the tribal merger.

When the tribes merged, the original Khangkhaw members, under the control of Lisa, used their majority to systematically eliminate the former Chani members. Khangkhaw's rocky tribe dynamic caused their numbers to dwindle as Dave stayed alive. He won a crucial immunity challenge and maneuvered his way to the Final Tribal Council alongside Tess and Lisa. At the Final Tribal Council, Dave was criticized for keeping his friendship with Matt being viewed as an unfair advantage in the game. Tess had many friends on the jury, though she was deemed to be an inferior strategist to Lisa, who was named the Sole Survivor in a 4-3-0 decision.

Challenge winners and eliminations by episode
Episode	Original air date	Challenge winner(s)		Outpost challenge		Eliminated	Finish
Episode	Original air date	Reward	Immunity	Winner	Loser	Eliminated	Finish
1	April 22, 2018	Jose [Matt] (Note: For winning the opening challenge, Jose and another castaway of her choice would earn the right to choose their tribes; she chose Matt.)	Khangkhaw	None		Jose	1st voted out Day 3
1	April 22, 2018	Khangkhaw	Khangkhaw	None		Jose	1st voted out Day 3
2	April 29, 2018	Khangkhaw	Khangkhaw	Tess	JT	Karla	2nd voted out Day 6
3	May 6, 2018	Chani	Khangkhaw	Kaysha	Eve	Franky	3rd voted out Day 9
4	May 13, 2018	Khangkhaw	Chani	Arun & Josh were given a dilemma (Note: In lieu of an Outpost Challenge, chosen castaways Arun and Josh had to pick someone from their tribe to remain at camp during the Immunity Challenge. This person would have immunity at their next Tribal Council should their tribe lose the Immunity Challenge. Josh chose himself and Arun chose Eve.)		Kaysha	4th voted out Day 12
4	May 13, 2018	Khangkhaw	Josh	Arun & Josh were given a dilemma		Kaysha	4th voted out Day 12
5	May 20, 2018	Khangkhaw	Chani	None		Liam	5th voted out Day 15
6	May 27, 2018	Chani	Khangkhaw	Renee	Tara	Josh	6th voted out Day 18
7	June 3, 2018	Khangkhaw	Khangkhaw	Lisa	Dave	JT	Quit; Day 21
7	June 3, 2018	Khangkhaw	Khangkhaw	Lisa	Dave	Dylan	7th voted out Day 21
8	June 10, 2018	Khangkhaw	Matt	None		Arun	8th voted out 1st jury member Day 24
9	June 17, 2018	Brad [Dave, Matt, Tess]	Eve	None		Brad	9th voted out 2nd jury member Day 27
10	June 24, 2018	Dave, Lisa, Matt, Tess	Adam	None		Renee	10th voted out 3rd jury member Day 29
11	July 1, 2018	Eve [Adam, Dave]	Matt	None		Eve	11th voted out 4th jury member Day 31
12	July 8, 2018	Survivor; Auction	Dave	None		Matt	12th voted out 5th jury member Day 33
13	July 15, 2018	Tess [Adam]	Tess	None		Adam	13th voted out 6th jury member Day 36
14	July 22, 2018	Dave [Tara]	Tess	None		Tara	14th voted out 7th jury member Day 38
15	July 29, 2018					Final vote	
15	July 29, 2018					Dave	2nd runner-up
15	July 29, 2018					Tess	Runner-up
15	July 29, 2018					Lisa	Sole Survivor

== Voting history ==
	Original tribes				Swapped tribes				Merged tribe							
Episode #	1	2	3	4	5	6	7		8		9	10	11	12	13	14
Day #	3	6	9	12	15	18	20		24		27	29	31	33	36	38
Eliminated	Jose	Karla	Franky	Kaysha	Liam	Josh	JT	Dylan	Arun		Brad	Renee	Eve	Matt	Adam	Tara
Votes	6–3	7–1	6–1	5–2–1–1	4–3	4–2–1	Quit (Note: JT chose to quit due to an illness on Day 20.)	5–1	5–3–2		5–3–1	5–3	6–1	3–2–1	3–2	2–1–1
Voter	Vote															
Lisa				Dylan	Liam				Arun	Arun (Note: Lisa used her vote stealer on Arun, therefore Arun was ineligible to vote whereas Lisa cast two ballots.)	Brad	Renee	Eve	Matt	Adam	Tara
Tess				Kaysha	Liam				Dave		Dave	Dave	Eve	Tara	Lisa	Dave
Dave	Jose	Karla	Franky			Josh		Dylan	Lisa		Brad	Renee	Eve	Matt	Adam	Tara
Tara				Dylan	Liam				Dave		Brad	Renee	Eve	Matt	Adam	Lisa
Adam				Kaysha		Dylan		Dylan	Arun		Dave	Dave	Eve	Tess	Lisa	
Matt				Kaysha		Dylan		Dylan	Arun		Brad	Renee	Eve	Tess		
Eve	Jose	Karla	Franky		Brad				Lisa		Brad	Renee	Dave			
Renee	Jose	Karla	Franky			Josh		Dylan	Arun		Dave	Dave				
Brad				Kaysha	Liam				Dave		Renee					
Arun	Karla	Karla	Franky			Josh		Dylan	None							
Dylan				Tess		Josh		Matt								
JT	Jose	Karla	Franky		Brad											
Josh				Kaysha		Renee										
Liam	Karla	Karla	Franky		Brad											
Kaysha				Adam												
Franky	Jose	Karla	Eve													
Karla	Jose	Liam														
Jose	Karla															

Final vote
Episode #	15		
Day #	39		
Finalist	Lisa	Tess	Dave
Votes	4–3–0		
Juror	Vote		
Tara	Lisa		
Adam		Tess	
Matt	Lisa		
Eve	Lisa		
Renee		Tess	
Brad		Tess	
Arun	Lisa		
