= Australian Survivor: Australia V The World =

Season of television series Australian Survivor

- Season 13
- Presented by: Jonathan LaPaglia
- No. of days: 16
- No. of castaways: 14
- Winner: Parvati Shallow
- Runner-up: Luke Toki
- Location: Upolu, Samoa
- No. of episodes: 10

Release
- Original network: Network 10
- Original release: 17 August – 7 September 2025

Additional information
- Filming dates: 20 September – 4 October 2024

Season chronology
- ← Previous; Brains V Brawn II Next → Redemption

Australian Survivor: Australia V The World, also known as Survivor: Australia V The World, is the thirteenth season of Australian Survivor and the eleventh to air on Network 10, premiering on 17 August 2025 and is based on the international reality competition franchise Survivor.

In this special shortened all-star crossover season celebrating the 10th anniversary of the Network 10 iteration of Australian Survivor, 14 former Survivor contestants from both Australia and around the world return to play Survivor in Samoa and are divided into two tribes: the "Aussie" tribe, which consists of former Australian Survivor contestants, and the "World" tribe, which consists of contestants from other versions of Survivor. Over 16 days, they competed for a grand prize of A$250,000. Network 10 confirmed in June 2025 that this would be Jonathan LaPaglia's final season as host.

After 16 days of competition, 4-time American Survivor player and Survivor US: Micronesia – Fans V Favourites winner Parvati Shallow won over Australians Luke Toki and Janine Allis in a 6–1–0 jury vote respectively, becoming one of the few two-time winners of Survivor worldwide, as well as the only two-time winner to win on different versions of the show.

== Contestants ==
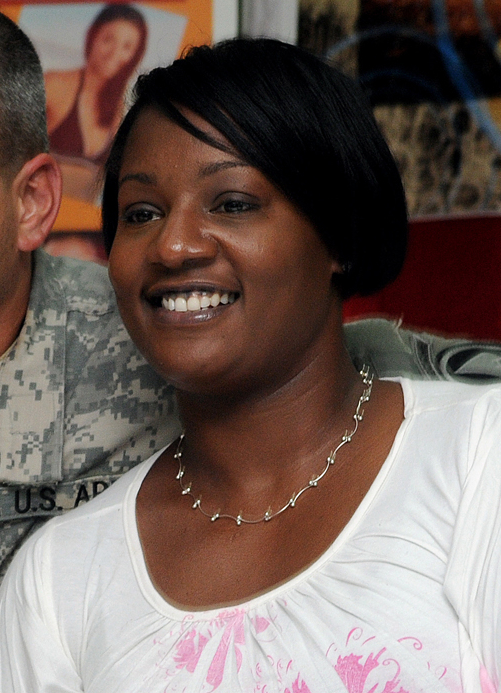
Cirie Fields

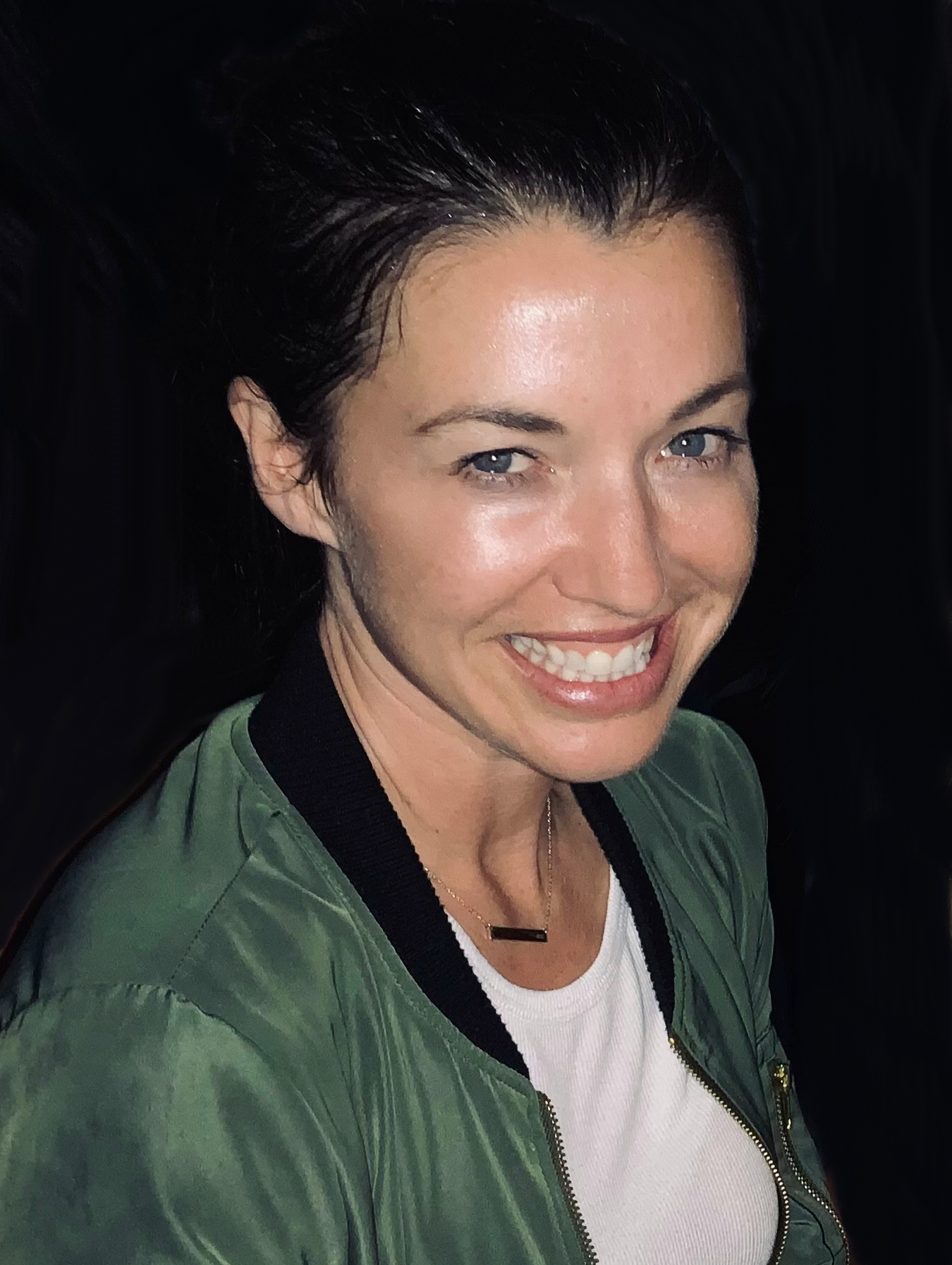
Parvati Shallow

The contestants are divided into two tribes based on their respective Survivor franchises they started on; either the Aussie tribe, which consists of contestants from Australian Survivor, or the World tribe with contestants from other versions including Finland's Selviytyjät Suomi, New Zealand's Survivor NZ, South Africa's Survivor South Africa, the United States' Survivor and the French Canadian edition, Survivor Québec.

The first six players revealed at Network 10's upfronts were Australian representatives George, Kirby and Shonee, and American representatives Cirie, Parvati and Tony for the World Tribe. The full cast was officially announced on 13 April 2025, with the first preview airing that night along with the penultimate episode of Brains V Brawn II.

In addition to the various past appearances of the contestants on Survivor and other reality shows, the series notably reunites David Genat and Parvati Shallow, who previously competed together on the second season of the American series Deal or No Deal Island, which was filmed shortly before production of Australia V The World and aired in early 2025 on NBC in America and 10Play in Australia.

List of Survivor: Australia V The World contestants
Contestant	Original tribe	Merged tribe	Finish
(South Africa) Rob Bentele 34, Richards Bay, KZN, South Africa SA: Island of Secrets	World		1st voted out Day 2
(Australia) David Genat 44, Perth, WA AU: Champions V Contenders II AU: All Stars	Aussie		2nd voted out Day 3
(Australia) George Mladenov 34, Sydney, NSW AU: Brains V Brawn AU: Heroes V Villains	Aussie		3rd voted out Day 5
(United States) Tony Vlachos 51, Allendale, NJ, USA US: Cagayan – Brains V Brawn V Beauty US: Game Changers US: Winners at War	World		4th voted out Day 6
(Australia) Sarah Tilleke 29, Sydney, NSW AU: 2017	Aussie	Moorditj	5th voted out 1st jury member Day 8
(Australia) Kirby Bentley 38, Melbourne, VIC AU: Titans V Rebels	Aussie	Moorditj	6th voted out 2nd jury member Day 9
(Canada) Kassandre "Kass" Bastarache 34, Trois-Rivières, QC, Canada QC: 2024	World	Moorditj	7th voted out 3rd jury member Day 11
(Finland) Tommi Manninen 34, Helsinki, Finland FI: 2022	World	Moorditj	8th voted out 4th jury member Day 11
(New Zealand) Lisa Holmes 44, Christchurch, New Zealand NZ: Thailand	World	Moorditj	9th voted out 5th jury member Day 12
(Australia) Shonee Bowtell 32, Noosa, QLD AU: Champions V Contenders AU: All Stars AU: Heroes V Villains	Aussie	Moorditj	10th voted out 6th jury member Day 14
(United States) Cirie Fields 54, Norwalk, CT, USA US: Panama – Exile Island US: Micronesia – Fans V Favourites US: Heroes V Villains US: Game Changers	World	Moorditj	11th voted out 7th jury member Day 15
(Australia) Janine Allis 58, Melbourne, VIC AU: Champions V Contenders II	Aussie	Moorditj	Second runner-up Day 16
(Australia) Luke Toki 37, Perth, WA AU: 2017 AU: Champions V Contenders II	Aussie	Moorditj	Runner-up; Day 16
(United States) Parvati Shallow 41, Los Angeles, CA, USA US: Cook Islands US: Micronesia – Fans V Favourites US: Heroes V Villains US: Winners at War	World	Moorditj	Sole Survivor; Day 16

=== Future appearances ===
David Genat began hosting future seasons of Australian Survivor starting with Australian Survivor: Redemption.

In 2026, Cirie Fields returned to the American Survivor and competed on Survivor US 50: In the Hands of the Fans. Tommi Manninen also returned to Finnish Survivor and competed on Selviytyjät Suomi 2027, along with other returning players.

In 2026, Kirby competed on the third season of The Traitors.

== Season summary ==
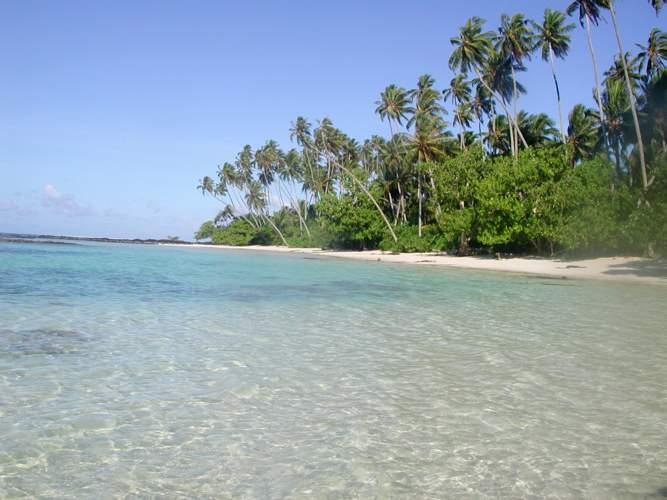
The season filmed in Upolu in Samoa.

Challenge winners and eliminations by episode

Episode			Challenge winner(s)		Eliminated	Finish
No.	Title	Original air date	Reward	Immunity	Eliminated	Finish
1	"The Multiverse"	17 August 2025	World (Note: The Reward Challenge was played in seven rounds, with the winner of each round taking a different reward item. The World tribe won four of the seven rounds, while the Aussie tribe won three.)	Aussie	Rob	1st voted out Day 2
1	"The Multiverse"	17 August 2025	Aussie	Aussie	Rob	1st voted out Day 2
2	"Kings and Queens and Gods"	18 August 2025	None	World	David	2nd voted out Day 3
3	"An Eye for An Eye"	19 August 2025	None	World	George	3rd voted out Day 5
4	"When the Other Shoe Drops"	24 August 2025	None	Sarah (Note: Both Aussie and World were to attend Tribal Council, each tribe competed among themselves for individual immunity. Sarah and Parvati won their tribe's immunity challenge.)	Tony	4th voted out Day 6
4	"When the Other Shoe Drops"	24 August 2025	None	Parvati	Tony	4th voted out Day 6
4	"When the Other Shoe Drops"	24 August 2025	None	Sarah [Aussie] (Note: At Tribal Council, Jonathan informed the players that a Fire Making Duel would occur to determine which tribe would win Immunity from that night's vote. A representative for each tribe would be chosen by random draw, with Cirie chosen for the World and Sarah for the Aussies. Sarah won, and the Aussie tribe were awarded Immunity.)	Tony	4th voted out Day 6
5	"Piss or Get Off the Pot"	25 August 2025	Survivor; Auction	Tommi (Note: The Immunity Challenge was cancelled midway through by production due to safety concerns from an incoming thunderstorm. The four remaining players in the challenge (Kass, Tommi, Janine & Luke) were given the option to draw rocks to decide who would win the immunity necklace or for no one to win immunity; they agreed to a draw, and Tommi won Immunity.)	Sarah	5th voted out 1st jury member Day 8
6	"My Fire Breathing Dragon"	26 August 2025	Kass (Note: Kass received a scroll to open the day after. In the following Day, Kass was informed that she won a trip to a spa and was invited to choose three people to join her.)		Kirby	6th voted out 2nd jury member Day 9
7	"Tastes Like Victory"	31 August 2025	[Cirie, Parvati, Tommi]	Tommi	Kass	7th voted out 3rd jury member Day 11
7	"Tastes Like Victory"	31 August 2025	None	Luke	Tommi	8th voted out 4th jury member Day 11
8	"The Weirdness Train"	1 September 2025	None	Luke	Lisa	9th voted out 5th jury member Day 12
9	"It’s About Endgame"	2 September 2025	None	~~Luke~~ (Janine) (Note: At Tribal Council, Luke chose to give his immunity to Janine.)	Shonee	10th voted out 6th jury member Day 14
10	"Ashes to Ashes"	7 September 2025	None	Parvati	Cirie	11th voted out 7th jury member Day 15
10	"Ashes to Ashes"	7 September 2025			Final vote	
10	"Ashes to Ashes"	7 September 2025			Janine	Second Runner-Up; Day 16
10	"Ashes to Ashes"	7 September 2025			Luke	Runner-up; Day 16
10	"Ashes to Ashes"	7 September 2025			Parvati	Sole Survivor; Day 16

== Episodes ==
No. overall	No. in season	Title	Timeline	Original release date
271	1	"The Multiverse"	Days 1–2	17 August 2025
Fourteen returning players arrive in Samoa and are divided into two tribes: "Team Aussie", consisting of seven Australians with one former winner (David), and "Team World", consisting of seven players from around the world with four former winners (Parvati, Rob, Lisa and 2-Time winner Tony).: Reward Challenge: One player from each team races down a water slide and under a net, then attempts to throw sandbags to ring a bell. First player to ring the bell in each round wins one item from an assortment of rewards to choose from.; Team World wins four of the seven reward items, including a locked box with a mystery item inside. During the challenge, David openly strategises with Rob, offering him a cross-tribe alliance and suggesting he vote out the Americans first. At the World beach, Americans Tony, Parvati and Cirie bond straight away, vowing to protect one another as the biggest threats. Cirie also bonds with a fan in Lisa, who vows to never betray her, and Parvati reaches out to Rob, telling him that she and David previously played Deal or No Deal Island together and both want to work with him. However, Rob and the other non-Americans view the Americans as too dangerous and plot to keep their numbers advantage and vote them out. At the Aussie beach, George seeks to make amends with Shonee, but she doesn't want to work with him again, instead bonding with Kirby. George also attempts to bond with David and Luke, but they too are wary of him, seeing George as an easy first vote out.: Immunity Challenge: Tribes maneuver heavy blocks through an obstacle course, then use them to build a staircase and climb a tower, where they fire slingshots at a series of targets. First tribe to smash all their targets wins tribal immunity.; Team Aussie wins immunity. After the challenge, Rob asks David and Luke to look for a key on their beach to the box he won at reward, which Parvati overhears. Back at World beach, Rob openly asks Parvati who she wants to vote for and suggests going after Cirie to keep the tribe strong. Tommi and Kass separately approach Cirie and Tony about potentially voting out Parvati; they say yes but privately don't want her out. Lisa is annoyed by Rob's commandeering play style and considers joining the Americans to blindside him instead. At Tribal Council, the World tribe discusses the speed of the gameplay and the amount of cross-talk between tribes thus far. Parvati points out how aggressively Rob has been playing from a power position. Rob exposes Parvati's history with David and points out how big of a threat she will be post-merge. However, when the votes are read, Rob is voted out of the tribe unanimously.
272	2	"Kings and Queens and Gods"	Day 3	18 August 2025
At the Aussie beach, Luke steals the tribe's bananas from the previous reward challenge, sharing them only with Shonee and David to build trust. He also finds a hidden immunity idol and does not tell anyone about it. David attempts to bond with Kirby, but she is nervous about his threat level. She approaches George about potentially blindsiding him, while George favors the safer vote-out of Janine. Sarah bonds with Kirby and strongly considers joining her for a David blindside. At the World beach, Parvati is concerned about the shifting tribe dynamics and considers forming a new women's alliance to stay safe. Tony notices the girls' majority and worries that Cirie and Parvati won't remain loyal to him.: Immunity Challenge: Tribes maneuver a heavy battering ram through an obstacle course, then set up blocks atop a pyramid and attempt to knock them down with sandbags. First tribe to finish wins immunity.; Team World wins immunity. George fears for his own safety and warns David that Kirby is pushing for his vote-out. Kirby becomes upset by this and considers voting out George, which David also pushes for her to consider. Sarah doesn't want to appear shifty to her new allies and promises to vote David, but privately wants to keep him and tries to switch the vote onto George. At Tribal Council, David calls attention to Kirby's strong gameplay thus far. Kirby whispers to her allies to keep the vote on David, and Sarah reaffirms her desire to remain loyal. David realizes that she is not with him and attempts to switch the vote to Shonee, but switches back to George at the last minute. George and David each receive three votes to Janine's one; on the re-vote, David is sent home.
273	3	"An Eye for An Eye"	Days 4–5	19 August 2025
At the Aussie beach, George lies when Luke says he wanted Shonee out and tries to paint Luke as untrustworthy. Shonee worries about the difficulty of getting out George and wonders if she made a mistake in not voting him out. Sarah feels threatened by Shonee's relationship with Kirby, and begins to rally votes against Shonee to solidify her own position. At the World beach, Tony worries about the female majority on the tribe threatening his position. He begins searching for a key to the locked box the tribe won at the first reward challenge, but Parvati finds it first. She tells the other girls about it, and they concoct a plan to draw Tony away from camp so they can open the box, which contains a clue to a hidden immunity idol, located underneath Jonathan's podium at Tribal Council. Kass also finds her own idol on the beach, which she decides to keep secret.: Immunity Challenge: Tribes hold up a series of hanging sandbags for as long as possible. Players may drop out at any time, handing off their bags to teammates. Last tribe holding up all their sandbags wins immunity.; Team World wins immunity. At the Aussie beach, George concocts a split vote plan on Janine and Luke and attempts to pit them against each other. However, Shonee is irritated by George sharing information with the other tribe at the challenge and wants him out. The rest of the tribe weighs the benefits of blindsiding George versus Shonee heading into a merge. At Tribal Council, most of the tribe feels more confident and unified about tonight's plan than last tribal. Janine worries that George has an idol and asks Luke to split his vote onto Shonee for protection. When the votes are read, George is voted out in a 3–2–1 vote over Shonee and Luke.
274	4	"When the Other Shoe Drops"	Day 6	24 August 2025
At the World beach, Parvati plans to keep the girls strong and ensure that a guy goes home next, but doesn't want Tony out yet because he is useful as a shield. Kass believes Tony is too dangerous and that Tommi will remain loyal at the merge. Cirie worries that the international players are too loyal to one another. At the Aussie beach, Janine and Luke feel at the bottom of the tribe but vow to stick together to the end. Sarah tells Janine that she's uncertain about Kirby, and Janine relays this to Kirby to convince her to flip on her alliance.: Immunity Challenge: Players sit on a perch balancing a box against a pole with their feet. Last player of each tribe remaining wins individual immunity, with both tribes going to tribal council tonight.; Parvati and Sarah win immunity, and Jonathan reveals that only one person will be going home tonight. At the Aussie beach, Kirby is upset that her planned target is now immune. Shonee begins rallying votes against Janine, but Luke doesn't want her out and works to flip the vote onto Shonee. At the World beach, Tony feels uneasy and tries to listen in on the girls' conversations. Kass and Lisa begin to worry that Parvati is untrustworthy and talks to Cirie about flipping on Tony. Tony decides to cause chaos at tribal council to disrupt the girls' plans. At Tribal Council, Jonathan informs both tribes that one representative from each tribe will compete in a fire-making challenge against one another, chosen by random rock draw, with the winner earning safety for their entire tribe. Sarah and Cirie draw the white rocks, and Sarah wins the fire-making challenge, sending the Aussie tribe back to camp. Tony begins to whisper asking for names, determines Parvati of finding the key to the lock box, and claims to have an idol, causing the girls to worry about their plan. While the girls talk in private, Tony schemes with Tommi to convince the other international players to vote for Cirie. However, when the votes are read, Tony is sent home unanimously. Before leaving Tribal Council, Parvati grabs the idol from beneath Jonathan's podium.
275	5	"Piss or Get Off the Pot"	Days 7–8	25 August 2025
At the World beach, Parvati feels more comfortable now that she has the idol. The tribe is nervous about a potential 5-5 deadlock at the merge, but all hope to stay World strong for at least the first vote. The next day, both tribes arrive at the reward challenge and learn that they are officially merged.: Reward Challenge: Players are given $500 to bid on a series of reward items in the Survivor Auction. The auction can end at any time.; During the auction, Luke wins an advantage to send one player back to camp immediately, angering Parvati when he chooses her. However, when she gets to camp, she finds a jar of cookies waiting for her, which she elects to keep to herself. The jar also contains an advantage, allowing her to steal another player's idol if she guesses they have one correctly. Luke hopes to keep the Aussies strong at the merge, but Shonee considers flipping as she only feels loyal to Kirby. Sarah and Kirby both express interest in working with Parvati and Cirie, and throw one another under the bus to curry favor with the Americans.: Immunity Challenge: Players float in the ocean under a grate as the tide slowly rises, taking away their breathing space. Last player remaining under their grate wins individual immunity.; Production halts the challenge halfway through due to a lightning storm. Jonathan offers the four remaining players in the challenge a chance to draw rocks for immunity, otherwise no one is safe; the players agree, and Tommi draws the white rock to win immunity. Back at camp, players attempt to strategize while sheltering from the storm. The Aussies plan to vote for Kass while the World players plan to vote for Janine. However, Shonee and Kirby approach the World tribe about blindsiding Sarah. The World tribe are nervous about whether Kirby is telling the truth and consider shifting their vote elsewhere. Luke learns that Kirby is targeting Sarah and begs her to reconsider to keep the majority. At Tribal Council, Kass expresses suspicion about how many names were being thrown around today. Cirie says that tonight's vote will determine the dynamics for the rest of the game. Parvati hopes that there won't be a rock draw and the tribe can come to a unified decision. Lisa whispers to Cirie, worried that someone will play an idol on Sarah. However, no idols are played, and Sarah is sent home in a 4–3–3 vote over Janine and Kass.
276	6	"My Fire Breathing Dragon"	Day 9	26 August 2025
Kirby and Parvati commit to work together until the end, but both are nervous that the other will blindside them. Kass and Lisa feel like Parvati is ignoring them and worry that they're being left out of the new majority alliance. Luke and Janine strategize from the bottom of the tribe, and plan to enact revenge against their fellow Aussies who flipped. Janine tells Parvati that Kass is threatened by her, causing Parvati to consider voting her out.: Immunity/Reward Challenge: Players hold up two parallel vertical beams for as long as possible. Last player standing wins immunity and a mystery advantage in the game.; Kass outlasts Parvati to win immunity, along with a scroll that can't be read until the following morning. Parvati and Kirby plan to break up the international alliance by targeting Lisa. Shonee and Luke scheme with the international players to blindside Cirie. Janine and Cirie discuss how untrustworthy Kirby is and consider going after her next. Parvati worries that she will become an easy next target if Kirby is voted out, and considers playing her idol to save Kirby tonight. At Tribal Council, Luke points out how Kirby betrayed Sarah at the last vote, proving she can't be trusted as an ally. The tribe discusses how common lying is in the game and how hard it is to trust anyone. Cirie hopes that tonight's vote will tell her who she can trust moving forward. When the votes are read, Kirby is voted out 6–2–1 over Cirie and Lisa.
277	7	"Tastes Like Victory"	Days 10–11	31 August 2025
Parvati and Cirie express mixed feelings about Kirby going home. Luke apologizes to Cirie for voting for her and tells her that the international players were considering flipping on her. The next morning, Kass reads the scroll she won at yesterday’s challenge, which invites her to an afternoon at the Survivor Spa along with three guests; she chooses Parvati, Cirie, and Tommi. The group debate whether to target Luke or Shonee next, and Parvati tells Cirie about her steal-an-idol advantage. Back at camp, Luke, Janine and Shonee smash open the locked box and find it empty, realizing that someone in the majority has an idol.: Immunity Challenge: Players stack blocks atop an unstable table, attempting to build them high enough to reach a marker. They must constantly fill a leaky bucket with water to keep the table level. First player to stack their blocks to the marker wins immunity.; Tommi wins immunity. The World players scheme to eliminate one of the Aussies, but privately, Tommi wants to go after Parvati. Lisa tells Luke and Shonee about the plan, but Luke doesn’t trust her after the last vote. Parvati begins to suspect that she is being targeted for a blindside. At Tribal Council, Janine and Luke begin to whisper about flipping their vote to Lisa, causing Parvati to pull Kass aside and ask if she’s going after her, which Kass denies. Parvati pulls out her idol and suggests that she might play it for herself or Cirie tonight. Luke tells Parvati that Lisa brought up her name today, and the Aussies tells Cirie they are voting for Lisa. Parvati pulls Luke aside and suggests targeting Kass first as a bigger threat than Lisa. Before the votes are read, Kass attempts to play her idol, but Parvati reveals her advantage, threatening to steal it. Kass promises she’s playing it for Lisa, and Parvati declines to use her advantage, allowing her to do so. When the votes are read, Kass is sent home 5-2-1 over Luke and Shonee. Jonathan then informs the tribe that there will be another immunity challenge and vote tonight, taking them straight to the challenge area.: Immunity Challenge: Players steady a wobbling table with a rope, balancing balls atop its surface. First player to balance all five balls on their table wins immunity.; Luke wins immunity. Back at Tribal Council, Parvati says she plans to vote for Tommi, and Tommi attempts to convince the Aussies that Parvati is too dangerous with all her advantages. Luke worries that Lisa will come after him next if she isn’t sent home tonight, and considers keeping Tommi. Lisa openly contemplates quitting the game to protect Tommi, but decides against it after Jonathan reveals a vote would still take place. When the votes are read, Tommi is voted out 5–1–1 over Cirie and Janine.
278	8	"The Weirdness Train"	Day 12	1 September 2025
Lisa attempts to mend relationships back at camp, but nobody trusts her. She attempts to sow seeds of doubt with Luke to split him up from the other Aussies, but he doesn’t want to work with her. She also tells Parvati that everyone wants her out.: Immunity Challenge: Players drop a ball into a winding track, then race to the bottom to catch it before it falls. At intervals, they must add more balls until as many as five balls are in the track at once. Last player to drop a ball wins immunity.; Luke wins immunity. Janine and Luke discuss Shonee’s threat level, and aren’t sure if they want to go to the end with her. Lisa tells Shonee that Luke and Janine are a tight pair and suggests breaking them up by voting Janine. Cirie feels close with Lisa and considers trying to save her. Luke tells Parvati about his idol, and offers her a final three deal in exchange for ripping her steal-an-idol advantage in half; she accepts and gives him the other half. At Tribal Council, the tribe discusses shifting dynamics after two World members went home last night. Parvati believes her position in the game is stronger with the international players out of the game. Lisa points out that there are only three spots in the final tribal council, and not everyone in the majority can get there. However, when the votes are read, Lisa is voted out unanimously.
279	9	"It’s About Endgame"	Days 13–14	2 September 2025
The tribe schemes to vote out Shonee next, but Parvati worries that Luke and Janine will not honor their final four deal and go after Cirie. Janine hopes to convince Cirie and Parvati that they should take her to final three over Luke. Shonee begins to plant seeds of doubt in Parvati that Janine is a bigger threat than she realizes.: Immunity Challenge: Players maneuver through an obstacle course, then attempt to stack blocks atop a wobbling table without knocking it over. First player to stack all their blocks wins immunity.; Luke wins immunity. Shonee is worried about the two pairs left in the game and hopes to pit them against each other. Parvati worries that Luke will play his idol for Shonee and get rid of Cirie. Luke lies to everyone about having an idol, and considers doing something crazy with it tonight. At Tribal Council, Parvati pulls out her idol to indicate she is safe tonight. Luke pulls Janine aside and asks for her loyalty at final four; when she agrees, he gives Janine his immunity necklace and pulls out his own idol. Both Parvati and Luke suggest that they might play their idols for someone else. Cirie feels nervous about having no protection but believes she has built enough trust to survive tonight. Before the votes are read, Parvati and Luke looked to play their idols, but were cautious as to what the other would do – they playfully agreed to play their idols for each other, and Shonee is voted out 4–1 over Cirie.
280	10	"Ashes to Ashes"	Days 15–16	7 September 2025
The four remaining players reflect on their Survivor journeys so far ahead of the final immunity challenge.: Immunity Challenge: Players stand on narrow pegs while holding onto heavy weights. At intervals, they must move to narrower pegs, making it harder to balance. Last player standing wins immunity.; Parvati outlasts Luke to win immunity. Parvati and Cirie believe Luke is a major jury threat and hope Janine will join them to vote him out. Luke asks Janine to join him in voting for Cirie so that he has a chance to make fire against her. Janine weighs whether to honor her agreement with Luke after he gave her the immunity necklace at the last Tribal Council. At Tribal Council, Parvati discusses the pride involved in representing her country at the final vote. Luke knows he’s in trouble tonight and hopes Janine will consider improving the Aussies' odds of winning by putting two of them in the final. Janine knows she is going to disappoint somebody with her vote tonight. When the votes are read, Luke and Cirie receive two votes apiece, forcing a fire making tiebreaker. Luke wins the tiebreaker, and – much like her first season Cirie is sent to the Jury after losing a Fire Duel. The final three enjoy a celebratory breakfast and plan their speeches before heading to Final Tribal Council. Janine describes her loyal game and decision to save Luke, but is criticized for breaking up the Aussies at the merge. Luke explains how he fought from the bottom and gained Parvati’s trust to get to the end. Parvati explains how she used her advantages to her benefit, and why she chose not to work with people like Kirby and Tommi. The jury votes in Parvati’s favor 6–1–0 over Luke and Janine, awarding her the $250,000 and the title of Sole Survivor.

== Voting history ==
	Original Tribes					Merged Tribe							
Episode #	1	2		3	4	5	6	7		8	9	10	
Day #	2	3		5	6	8	9	11 (Note: This was a Double Tribal Council. Following the first round of voting, the remaining Moorditj castaways competed in an immunity challenge and participated in a second round of voting.)		12	14	15	
Eliminated	Rob	Tie (Note: The first round of voting resulted in a tie. Per the rules, a second vote was held where the castaways involved in the tie would not vote and the remaining castaways could only vote for those who tied.)	David	George	Tony	Sarah	Kirby	Kass	Tommi	Lisa	Shonee	Tie (Note: The first Tribal Council vote resulted in a tie. As there were only four castaways remaining, the two tied castaways competed in a fire-making challenge to resolve the tie.)	Cirie
Votes	6–1	3–3–1	3–2	3–2–1	5–1	4–3–3	6–2–1	5–2–1 (Note: Kass played a hidden immunity idol on Lisa; however, no votes were negated.)	5–1–1	5–1	4–1 (Note: Parvati played a hidden immunity idol on Luke; however, no votes were negated.) (Note: Luke played a hidden immunity idol on Parvati; however, no votes were negated.)	2–2	Challenge (Note: Cirie lost to Luke in a fire-making challenge.)
Voter	Vote												
Parvati	Rob				Tony	Sarah	Kirby	Kass	Tommi	Lisa	Shonee	Luke	
Luke		George	George	Shonee		Kass	Cirie	Kass	Tommi	Lisa	Shonee	Cirie	Won
Janine		George	George	Shonee		Kass	Kirby	Kass	Tommi	Lisa	Shonee	Cirie	
Cirie	Rob				Tony	Sarah	Kirby	Kass	Tommi	Lisa	Shonee	Luke	Lost
Shonee		David	David	George		Sarah	Cirie	Kass	Tommi	Lisa	Cirie		
Lisa	Rob				Tony	Janine	Kirby	Luke	Janine	Janine			
Tommi	Rob				Tony	Janine	Kirby	Shonee	Cirie				
Kass	Rob				Tony	Janine	Kirby	Luke					
Kirby		David	David	George		Sarah	Lisa						
Sarah		David	David	George		Kass							
Tony	Rob				Cirie								
George		Janine	None (Note: David and George were not eligible to vote in the second round of voting.)	Luke									
David		George	None										
Rob	Cirie												

Final vote
Episode #	10		
Day #	16		
Finalist	Parvati	Luke	Janine
Vote	6–1–0		
Juror	Vote		
Cirie	Parvati		
Shonee	Parvati		
Lisa	Parvati		
Tommi	Parvati		
Kass	Parvati		
Kirby	Parvati		
Sarah		Luke	

== Ratings ==
=== Ratings ===
Wk	Episode		Airdate	Timeslot	Overnight			7 Day Timeshift			Source
Wk	Episode		Airdate	Timeslot	Reach viewers	Total viewers	Rank	Reach viewers	Total viewers	Rank	Source
1	1	"The Multiverse"	17 August 2025	Sunday 7:00 pm	1,081,000	637,000	10	1,451,000	906,000	7	
1	2	"Kings and Queens and Gods"	18 August 2025	Monday 7:30 pm	1,182,000	616,000	11	1,483,000	842,000	8	
1	3	"An Eye for An Eye"	19 August 2025	Tuesday 7:30 pm	1,076,000	577,000	12	1,325,000	831,000	8	
2	4	"When the Other Shoe Drops"	24 August 2025	Sunday 7:00 pm	954,000	569,000	9	1,226,000	781,000	8	
2	5	"Piss or Get Off the Pot"	25 August 2025	Monday 7:30 pm	1,133,000	602,000	12	1,469,000	817,000	7	
2	6	"My Fire Breathing Dragon"	26 August 2025	Tuesday 7:30 pm	879,000	527,000	14	1,193,000	766,000	11	
3	7	"Tastes Like Victory"	31 August 2025	Sunday 7:00 pm	1,022,000	644,000	9	1,335,000	890,000	7	
3	8	"The Weirdness Train"	1 September 2025	Monday 7:30 pm	1,100,000	607,000	12	1,349,000	841,000	11	
3	9	"It’s About Endgame"	2 September 2025	Tuesday 7:30 pm	990,000	613,000	12	1,295,000	862,000	9	
4	10	"Ashes to Ashes"	7 September 2025	Sunday 7:00 pm	1,037,000	653,000	8	1,385,000	862,000	6	
