= Ma Jaya =

American spiritual teacher (1940-2012)

- Born: Joyce Green; May 26, 1940; Brooklyn, New York, U.S.
- Died: April 14, 2012 (aged 71); Indian River County, Florida

Ma Jaya Sati Bhagavati (May 26, 1940 – April 14, 2012), often shortened to Ma Jaya, was a devotee of Hindu Guru Neem Karoli Baba. She founded Kashi Ashram in Sebastian, Florida, in 1976. Jaya's interfaith teachings included a blend of philosophy from many different religions. She was involved in HIV/AIDS activism and hunger alleviation.

== Early life and spiritual beginnings ==
Ma Jaya was born as Joyce Green in Brooklyn, New York, and grew up in a cellar apartment near Brighton Beach. Her mother died from cancer when Jaya was thirteen years old. Ma Jaya said that as a young girl, she had conversations with unhoused people who lived underneath Coney Island boardwalk. The interactions led her to spend more time on Coney Island where she eventually met her husband, Sal DiFiore.

Ma Jaya and DiFiore married in 1956 and had three children. Jaya struggled with obesity in her thirties and in 1972 enrolled in Jack LaLanne weight-loss class where she learned breathing exercises for weight loss. While practicing the breathing exercise at home, she claimed to have series of mystical visions of Jesus Christ, and Neem Karoli Baba. After an alleged experience of stigmata, Jaya began meditating on a regular basis and became acquainted with spiritual teacher Hilda Charlton who helped to introduce her to spiritual seekers in the New York area.

== Kashi Ashram ==
Ma Jaya moved to Indian River County, Florida, in 1976 where she founded Kashi Ashram. The 80-acre (32 ha) property, on the St. Sebastian River just west of the city of Sebastian, was developed by students. The ashram has a communal living structure; residents help with maintenance, food preparation, and participation in yoga and meditation practices. At one time, the ashram had more than two hundred residents.

A K–12 primary and secondary education center called the River School (originally the Ranch School) was opened in the early 1980s and closed after graduating its final class in 2005.

The River Fund, an HIV/AIDS education and prevention program, was created in 1990 and is still in operation.

In the early 1990s, Ma Jaya frequently visited the Comprehensive AIDS Program in Palm Beach County, Florida. She was known for wearing strong perfume because, according to her, she wanted her boys to know she was there, referring to a number of men who lost their eyesight due to complications of living with AIDS. During her visits, she brought baked goods that she distributed to the program's staff and clients.

An affordable living community named By the River was opened in 2009 and included accommodations for forty low-income seniors. By the River was foreclosed on in 2013.

The Kashi Ashram community remains active, including a retreat center, yoga school, and sustainable farm. The retreat was visited by Julia Roberts after she discovered Ma Jaya's teachings while researching her role for the 2010 film Eat Pray Love.

Satellite branches of Kashi Ashram were established in New York, Los Angeles, Chicago, Colorado, Santa Fe, and Atlanta. Jaya Devi Bhagavati founded Kashi Atlanta Ashram in 1999 in the Candler Park neighborhood.

== Criticism ==
Ma Jaya faced accusations of emotional and physical assaults, substance abuse, and the promotion of cult-like practices. The Kashi Church Foundation has denied these allegations.

American spiritual teacher Ram Dass wrote a 1976 Yoga Journal article entitled "Egg on My Beard" in which he criticized Ma Jaya's teaching style as "disquieting" and referred to her as "Ms. Big" and an embodiment of the Hindu goddess Kali. Dass asserted that Jaya asked him and other followers to purchase costly gold bracelets and semiprecious gemstones for her personal use in grounding practices during and after meditation. He went on to narrate an alleged incident in which Jaya, accompanied by a group of her followers, climbed an eighteen-story apartment building in New York City to gain access to his residence without his permission.

Rick Alan Ross, a self-styled cult specialist, referred to Ma Jaya as a "charismatic leader of a potentially destructive cult."

Paul R. Martin, clinical psychologist and founder of Wellspring Retreat and Resource Center, described Kashi Ashram as "having all the markings of a cult."

A 1993 People magazine article entitled "It's not just Waco—Cults rule by paranoia flourish under America" criticized Kashi Ashram.

In 2013, Ma Jaya's youngest daughter sued the Kashi Church Foundation in Miami court, claiming that in 1981 she was sexually assaulted by a church member after being married to him against her will. Jaya's daughter claimed that on December 10, 1981, she was married to 25-year-old Kevin Brannon so that she could be impregnated to allegedly provide more church members for Ma Jaya. The Kashi Ashram and Brannon deny that the sexual assault ever happened.

According to follower Lyn Deadmore in her journal in 1981, Ma Jaya is said to have ordered marriages between devotees who "barely knew each other," although most seemed to consent. A spokesperson for Kashi Ashram denies that these arranged marriages occurred.

1989 and 2001 court filings alleged that Jaya manipulated followers into giving her custody of their children.

In 2025, television personality Parvati Shallow detailed her experiences growing up at Kashi Ashram in her book, Nice Girls Don't Win. Shallow and her family were affiliated with Kashi Ashram until breaking ties with the group when she was nine years old. During her affiliation, Shallow recalls FBI agents collecting one of her friends and reuniting her with her birth parents after Ma Jaya allegedly gained custody of the child under false pretenses and refused to return her to her birth parents. She also detailed her parents' experience initially leaving the group when she was two months old, then returning shortly after. Ma Jaya allegedly punished her parents for leaving by forcing her father to live separately from her and her mother for approximately six months upon their return.

== Publications and artwork ==
Ma Jaya authored a number of publications including "Deep and Simple Wisdom: Spiritual Teachings of Ma Jaya Sati Bhagavati", "The 11 Karmic Spaces: Choosing Freedom from the Patterns That Bind You", and "The River." Jaya was an accomplished artist and primarily used acrylic on canvas to depict complex scenes involving Hindu deities and abstract storytelling that illustrated scenes of Universal spiritual wisdom.

== Death ==
Ma Jaya died of pancreatic cancer on April 13, 2012, at her home in Kashi Ashram. A memorial service was held in her honor at Kashi Ashram on May 26, 2012.

== Honours and affiliations ==
According to the Kashi foundation, Ma Jaya was widely recognized for her work and was a recipient of many awards and honors. However, many of these awards are unverifiable.

1. Recipient, Interfaith Visionary Award, 2010 from the Temple of Understanding.
2. Recipient of Humanitarian Service Award 2007 from the Gandhi Foundation.
3. Recipient of title Mata Maha Mandaleshwar from the Ma Yoga Shakti Mission
4. Recipient of the Interparliamentary Paradigm of Peace Award.
5. Recipient of the United Foundation for AIDS Award.
6. Recipient of the Universal Way Award.
7. Inducted into the Martin Luther King Jr. Board of Preachers, Morehouse College.

Ma Jaya had many affiliations with various international organisations, including:

1. Trustee Emeritus of the Council for the Parliament of the World's Religions
2. Advisory Board Member of Equal Partners in Faith
3. Advisory Board Member of the Institute on Religion and Public Policy
4. Advisory Board Member of the Gardner's Syndrome Association
5. Delegate to the United Religions Initiative
6. Member of the Board of Directors of the AIDS care organization Project Response
7. Member of the Parliament's General Assembly.
