= Survivor NZ: Nicaragua =

- Season 1
- Presented by: Matt Chisholm
- No. of days: 39
- No. of castaways: 16
- Winner: Avi Duckor-Jones
- Runner-up: Thomas "Tom" Paterson
- Location: Nicaragua
- No. of episodes: 20

Release
- Original network: TVNZ 2
- Original release: 7 May – 5 July 2017

Season chronology
- Next → Survivor NZ: Thailand

Survivor NZ: Nicaragua is the first season of Survivor NZ, a television series based on the popular reality game show Survivor. The series was announced in February 2016, and premiered on TVNZ 2 on 7 May 2017. The season was filmed in Nicaragua, the same location as four seasons of the American edition of Survivor: Nicaragua, Redemption Island, San Juan del Sur and Worlds Apart.

The sixteen contestants were initially separated into two tribes, named Hermosa and Mogotón. When ten players remained, they merged into one tribe, named Casar. Avi Duckor-Jones won the season and was named the Sole Survivor. Matai'a Salatielu "Sala" Tiatia was voted the Gem People's Choice Award.

== Contestants ==
List of Survivor NZ: Nicaragua contestants
Contestant	Original tribe	Switched tribe	Merged tribe	Main game	Redemption Island
Dee Cambiaso; 29, Auckland	Hermosa			2nd voted out Day 1	Lost duel 1 Day 2
Hannah Gough; 27, Whangārei	Mogotón			1st voted out Day 1	Lost duel 2 Day 6
Tony Deane; 55, Gisborne	Mogotón			3rd voted out Day 4	Lost duel 3 Day 10
Louisa "Lou" McClintock; 19, Cheviot	Mogotón			Medically evacuated Day 10	
Isabel "Izzy" Pearson; 30, Auckland	Mogotón			4th voted out Day 8	Lost duel 4 Day 14
Georgia Bergerson; 26, Palmerston North	Hermosa	Hermosa		5th voted out Day 12	Lost duel 5 Day 17
Shayna "Shay" Swain-Tapusoa; Returned to game	Mogotón	Mogotón		6th voted out Day 16	1st returnee Day 17
Lee Den Haan; 29, Motueka	Hermosa	Mogotón	Casar	7th voted out Day 20	Lost duel 6; 1st jury member Day 22
Matai'a Salatielu "Sala" Tiatia; 40, Christchurch	Mogotón	Hermosa	Casar	9th voted out Day 24	Lost duel 7; 2nd jury member Day 25
Shannon Quinn; 24, Christchurch	Hermosa	Hermosa (Note: Shannon was exiled to Redemption Island for 24 hours after drawing the black buff during the tribe switch. She joined the tribe that lost the next Immunity Challenge, Hermosa, after their Tribal Council.)	Casar	11th voted out Day 28	Lost duel 8; 3rd jury member Day 30
Shayna "Shay" Swain-Tapusoa; 27, Hamilton	Mogotón	Mogotón	Casar	12th voted out Day 32	Lost duel 9; 4th jury member Day 34
Jak Thomas; 22, Lower Hutt	Hermosa	Mogotón	Casar	10th voted out Day 26	Lost duel 10; 5th jury member Day 36
Mike Sparrow; Returned to game	Hermosa	Mogotón	Casar	8th voted out Day 20	2nd returnee Day 36
Nate Davis; Returned to game	Hermosa	Hermosa	Casar	13th voted out Day 35	3rd returnee Day 36
Mike Sparrow; 27, Tauranga	Hermosa	Mogotón	Casar	14th voted out 6th jury member Day 37	
Nate Davis; 45, Dannevirke	Hermosa	Hermosa	Casar	15th voted out 7th jury member Day 38	
Barbara "Barb" Raos; 53, Auckland	Hermosa	Hermosa	Casar	2nd runner-up	
Tom Paterson; 26, Tauranga	Mogotón	Mogotón	Casar	Runner-up	
Avi Duckor-Jones; 32, Wellington	Mogotón	Hermosa	Casar	Sole Survivor	

== Season summary ==
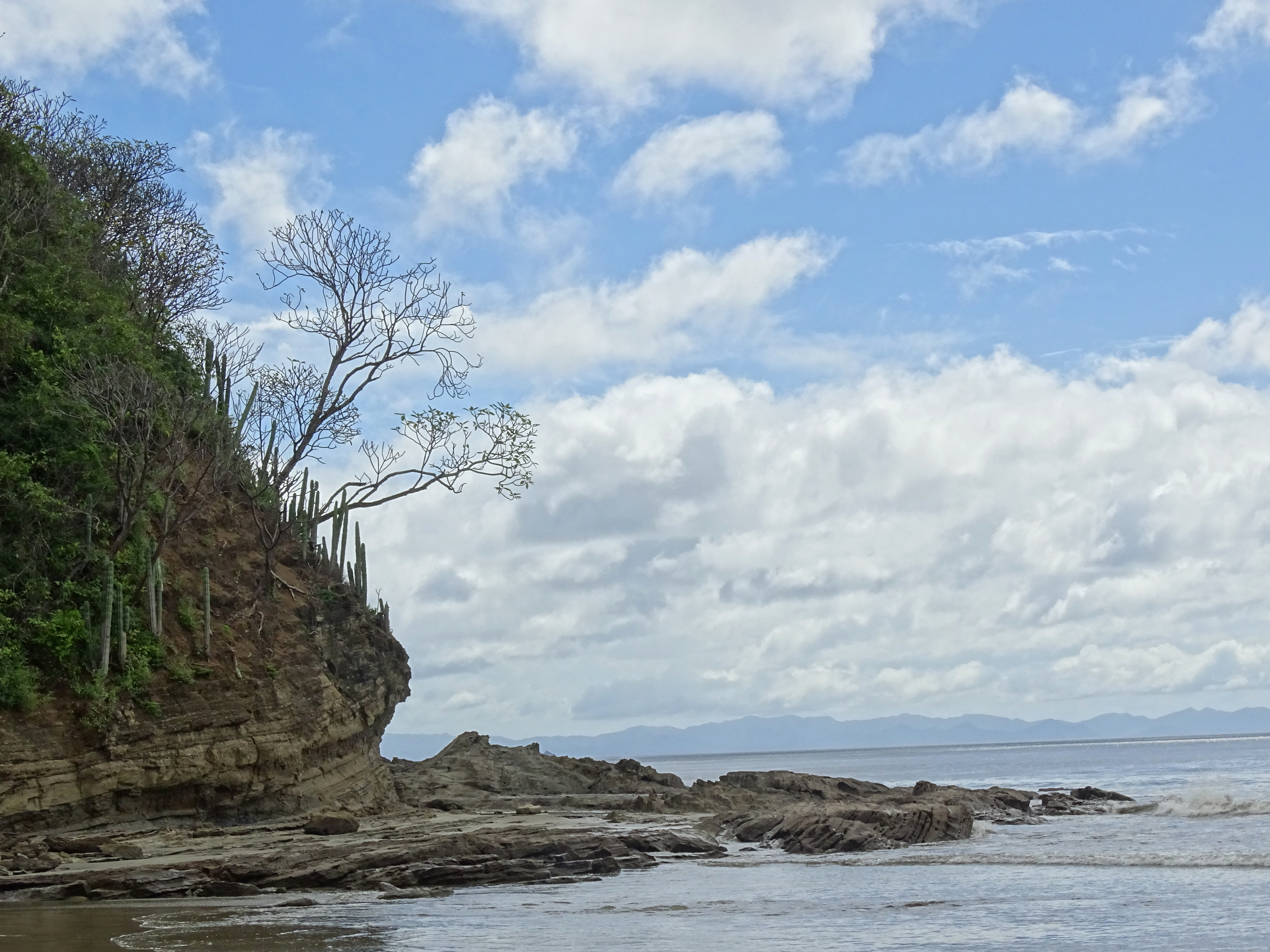
The season filmed in San Juan del Sur in Nicaragua.

Sixteen castaways arrived in Nicaragua and were divided into two tribes of eight: Mogotón and Hermosa. Immediately, both tribes were informed that they would each vote out a player that same day with no opportunity to earn immunity. Following the double elimination, Redemption Island was introduced, giving previously eliminated players another chance to return to the game. Hermosa fared better in challenges, and Mogotón's woes continued with a surprise medical evacuation. Afterwards, tribes were shuffled with the former Hermosa members in the majority on both tribes. Nate and Barb blindsided Georgia on Hermosa, and Tom betrayed his former Mogotón members to side with the Hermosa men and eliminate his rival Shay on Mogotón.

Shay returned to the game after defeating Georgia in the final pre-merge duel, and the tribes merged. The former Hermosa members maintained a majority over Mogotón, but loyalties were in question due to the tribal shuffle. Nate, Barb, Avi and Sala brought in Shannon and counted on Tom to rejoin his old Mogotón players, due to their being down in numbers. The alliance of five quickly took out Lee and Mike, but briefly fell apart after Barb organised a blindside of Sala, the most liked player in the game.

After Sala's blindside, Tom realised he needed to realign with Avi, and they proved to be the most powerful duo in the game (rivaling Nate and Barb). Nate was eliminated at the final four after Barb won a crucial immunity. In spite of both Mike and Nate winning their way back from Redemption Island at the end of the competition, Avi, Tom and Barb remained strong to the end, with Barb saying all along that her mission in the game was to get one of them to win. When the three finalists faced the jury, Barb was grilled for being lazy and accused of not playing for almost half of the game. Tom had many allies on the jury but Avi's stronger argument (highlighting Tom staying in the game due to Avi saving him) earned him the title of Sole Survivor by a vote of 6–1–0.

Challenge winners and eliminations by cycle
Episode(s)	Original air date(s)	Redemption Island duel		Challenge winner(s)		Voted out	Finish	Source
Episode(s)	Original air date(s)	Winner(s)	Eliminated	Reward	Immunity	Voted out	Finish	Source
1 & 2	May 7 & 8, 2017	None (Note: There was no Redemption Island duel as there were fewer than two inhabitants.)		None (Note: There were no challenges due to the double Tribal Council.)		Hannah	1st voted out Day 1	
1 & 2	May 7 & 8, 2017	None		None		Dee	2nd voted out Day 1	
1 & 2	May 7 & 8, 2017	Hannah	Dee	None	Hermosa	Tony	3rd voted out Day 4	
3 & 4	May 14 & 15, 2017	Tony	Hannah	Hermosa	Hermosa	Izzy	4th voted out Day 8	
5 & 6	May 21 & 22, 2017	Izzy	Tony	Mogotón	Shannon (Note: Shannon was exiled to Redemption Island for 24 hours after drawing the black buff during the tribe switch. She joined the tribe that lost the next Immunity Challenge, Hermosa, after their Tribal Council.)	Lou	Medically evacuated Day 10	
5 & 6	May 21 & 22, 2017	Izzy	Tony	Mogotón	Mogotón	Georgia	5th voted out Day 12	
7 & 8	May 28 & 29, 2017	Georgia	Izzy	Hermosa	Hermosa	Shay	6th voted out Day 16	
9 & 10	June 4 & 5, 2017	Shay (Note: Returned to game upon winning Redemption Island duel.)	Georgia	Mike [Shannon, Shay]	Mike	Lee	7th voted out Day 20	
11 & 12	June 11 & 12, 2017	None		None (Note: Immediately after the Tribal Council vote on Day 20, a second immunity challenge and Tribal Council vote were held; there was no reward challenge.)	Jak	Mike	8th voted out Day 20	
11 & 12	June 11 & 12, 2017	Mike	Lee	Barb [Jak, Nate, Sala]	Tom	Sala	9th voted out Day 24	
13 & 14	June 18 & 19, 2017	Mike	Sala	None	Tom	Jak	10th voted out Day 26	
13 & 14	June 18 & 19, 2017	Mike	Sala	None	Tom	Shannon	11th voted out Day 28	
15 & 16	June 25 & 26, 2017	Jak	Shannon	Avi [Tom, Barb]	Tom	Shay	12th voted out Day 32	
15 & 16	June 25 & 26, 2017	Mike	Shannon	Avi [Tom, Barb]	Tom	Shay	12th voted out Day 32	
17, 18 & 19	July 2, 3 & 4, 2017	Jak	Shay	Avi, Nate	Barb	Nate	13th voted out Day 35	
17, 18 & 19	July 2, 3 & 4, 2017	Mike	Shay	Avi, Nate	Barb	Nate	13th voted out Day 35	
17, 18 & 19	July 2, 3 & 4, 2017	Mike	Jak	None	Tom	Mike	14th voted out 6th jury member Day 37	
17, 18 & 19	July 2, 3 & 4, 2017	Nate	Jak	None	Tom	Mike	14th voted out 6th jury member Day 37	
17, 18 & 19	July 2, 3 & 4, 2017			None	Avi	Nate	15th voted out 7th jury member Day 38	
20	July 5, 2017					Final vote		
20	July 5, 2017					Barb	2nd runner-up	
20	July 5, 2017					Tom	Runner-up	
20	July 5, 2017					Avi	Sole Survivor	

== Episodes ==
No. overall	No. in series	Title	Timeline	Original release date
1	1	"Episode 1"	Day 1-2	7 May 2017
On Day 1, the sixteen castaways, already divided, arrived on trucks at a beach. Matt, the host, asked them who would be more than happy to be labeled a villain if it meant winning the game, to which Dee rose her hand in agreement. He later proceeded to give them their buffs for their tribes, Hermosa and Mogotón. Matt also announced to the tribes that each tribe would vote someone out on their first day. He then gave them two minutes to strip everything of value from their boats. During the challenge, Izzy managed to steal from Hermosa's gathering. As Mogotón arrived at their camp after the challenge, Tony quickly embraced the leading role. Hannah, Izzy, and Shay agreed to vote out Tom first, as they found him untrustworthy. As Shay approached Sala with their plan, Sala suggested voting out Hannah in order to keep the tribe strong in future challenges. At Hermosa, Dee talked strategy with Georgia and Shannon, but the two weren't sure about her. Georgia managed to get Mike on her side, who also talked with Nate about voting out Dee. Georgia warned Mike about Barb and Nate, as they would likely align as the two oldest tribe members. Mogotón arrived at Tribal Council first, where Hannah was voted out unanimously. Later, at Hermosa's Tribal Council, Dee was voted out, also unanimously. The morning after, Izzy hadn't felt well, as her tribemates looked out for her. The two tribes arrived at an arena with a challenge on set. Matt surprised the tribes by calling Dee and Hannah in. He welcomed everyone to Redemption Island. He explained that after being eliminated from their tribe, they would get a chance to re-enter the game.: Redemption Island Challenge: The two Redemption Island inhabitants would use rope to tie together sticks in order to make a pole to retrieve three keys. The first two castaways to retrieve all three keys and unlock three locks would remain in the game.; At the Redemption Island Duel, Hannah was in an early lead. Dee managed to catch up to her, but in the end, Hannah won the duel, sending Dee home.
2	2	"Episode 2"	Day 2-4	14 May 2017
After returning to the camp from the Redemption Island Challenge, Mogotón realized that they might have underestimated Hannah. Avi and Tom made an alliance, while Sala approached Tony to join him alongside Lou and Shay to vote out Tom next. Avi talked with Lou and Shay, who assured him that he was safe and that they were going after Tom, which Avi wasn't sure about. At Hermosa, Lee and Mike bonded while eating termites in search of protein. Georgia and Lee discussed voting out Nate if they would lose immunity, as he was a bit of an outsider due to being older than them. Nate likewise grew wary of Georgia, wanting to vote her out.: Immunity Challenge: One member of each tribe would act as a caller while two other blindfolded tribe members would navigate the course to retrieve five items and lastly a flag, eventually working with another blindfolded pair who would hoist the items up to the caller's platform. The first tribe to get their flag up to their caller wins immunity.; The challenge started fairly even until Tony from Mogotón, who hoisted the items to the caller while blindfolded, accidentally caused an item to drop, letting Hermosa gain momentum and eventually win immunity. At Tribal Council, Tony was voted out due to costing his tribe the challenge.

== Voting history ==
	Original tribes					Switched tribes		Merged tribe								
Episode #	1		2	4	5	6	8	10	11	12	13	14	16	18	19	
Day #	1		4	8	10	12	16	20 (Note: Immediately after the Tribal Council vote on Day 20, a second immunity challenge and Tribal Council vote were held.)		24	26	28	32	35	37	38
Eliminated	Hannah	Dee	Tony	Izzy	Lou	Georgia	Shay	Lee	Mike	Sala	Jak	Shannon	Shay	Nate	Mike	Nate
Votes	7–1	7–1	4–2–1	3–2–1	Evacuated (Note: Lou was medically evacuated from the game.)	4–1	3–2	6–4	6–3	4–3–1	6–1	4–2	4–1	3–1	4–1	3–1
Voter	Vote															
Avi	Hannah		Tony	Izzy		Georgia		Lee	Mike	Jak	Jak	Shannon	Shay	Nate	Mike	Nate
Tom	Hannah		Tony	Izzy			Mike	Shay	Shay	Sala	Jak	Shannon	Shay	Nate	Mike	Nate
Barb		Dee				Georgia		Lee	Mike	Sala	Jak	Shannon	Shay	Nate	Mike	Nate
Nate		Dee				Georgia		Lee	Mike	Shannon	Jak	Shannon	Shay	Tom	Mike	Tom
Mike		Dee					Shay	Shay	Shay						Avi	
Shay	Hannah		Tony	Lou			Mike	Lee	Mike	Jak	Jak	Barb	Barb			
Shannon		Dee				Exiled (Note: Shannon was exiled to Redemption Island for 24 hours after drawing the black buff during the tribe switch. She joined the tribe that lost the next Immunity Challenge, Hermosa, after their Tribal Council.)		Lee	Mike	Sala	Jak	Barb				
Jak		Dee					Shay	Shay	Shay	Sala	Nate					
Sala	Hannah		Tom	Izzy		Georgia		Lee	Mike	Jak						
Lee		Dee					Shay	Shay								
Georgia		Dee				Avi										
Lou	Hannah		Avi	Tom												
Izzy	Hannah		Tony	Tom												
Tony	Hannah		Tom													
Dee		Barb														
Hannah	Izzy															

Final vote
Episode #	20		
Day #	39		
Finalist	Barb	Tom	Avi
Votes	6-1-0		
Juror	Vote		
Nate			Avi
Mike			Avi
Jak		Tom	
Shay			Avi
Shannon			Avi
Sala			Avi
Lee			Avi
