= Survivor NZ =

- Also known as: Survivor New Zealand
- Genre: Reality competition
- Created by: Charlie Parsons
- Presented by: Matt Chisholm
- Country of origin: New Zealand
- Original language: English
- No. of seasons: 2
- No. of episodes: 35

Production
- Executive producer: Emma White
- Running time: 60–90 minutes
- Production company: Warner Bros. International Television Production New Zealand

Original release
- Network: TVNZ 2
- Release: 7 May 2017 – 29 July 2018

Related
- International versions

Survivor NZ is a New Zealand reality game show based on the international Survivor format. The series premiered on 7 May 2017 on the TVNZ 2, which also holds the broadcast rights to Australian Survivor. The show was renewed for a second season filmed in early 2018 and released on April 22.

Following the basic premise of other international versions of the format, it features a group of contestants who are marooned in an isolated location, where they must provide food, water, fire, and shelter for themselves. The contestants compete in challenges for rewards and immunity from elimination. The contestants are progressively eliminated from the game as they are voted out by their fellow contestants until only one remains and is given the title of "Sole Survivor" and awarded the grand prize. The first season's "Sole Survivor" received the prize of $100,000 New Zealand Dollars. By the second season, the prize for the winner got bumped up to $250,000.

== Format ==
The show follows the same general format as the other editions of the show. The players are split into several "tribes", are taken to a remote isolated location and are forced to live off the land with meager supplies for an extended period of time. Frequent physical and mental challenges are used to pit the teams against each other for rewards, such as food or luxuries, or for "immunity", forcing the other tribe to attend "Tribal Council", where they must vote off one of their players.

At a point in the middle of the game, the tribes are merged into a single tribe, and competitions are on an individual basis; winning immunity prevents that player from being voted out. Most players that are voted out at this stage form the "Jury". When two or three finalists remain, a final Tribal Council is held where the finalists plead their case to the Jury as to why they should win the game. The jurors then vote for a player to earn the title of "Sole Survivor" and the grand prize of NZ$250,000 ($100,000 in the first season).

== History ==
The first season of the show was announced on 24 February 2016, the same day that applications for the series opened. By 21 March 2016, the day applications closed, 8000 people had applied to be a contestant. Filming began for the first season in August 2016.

The show was renewed for a second season and applications opened on 3 September 2017. Once the applications had closed, filming began in January 2018. This premiere for this season was released on 22 April 2018.

== Seasons ==
List of Survivor NZ series
No.	Title	Premiere	Finale	Location	Days	Initial Tribes	Winner	Runner(s)-up		Final vote	Grand Prize
1	Survivor NZ: Nicaragua	7 May 2017	5 July 2017	Nicaragua	39	Two tribes of eight	Avi Duckor-Jones	Thomas "Tom" Paterson	Barbara "Barb" Raos	6–1–0	$100,000
2	Survivor NZ: Thailand	22 April 2018	29 July 2018	Khao Laem National Park, Thailand	39	Two tribes of nine, determined by schoolyard pick.	Lisa Stanger	Tess Fahey	Dave Lipanovic	4–3–0	$250,000

== International broadcast ==
- In Australia, the series was made available to stream on 10 Play in September 2020.
- In the United States, the series aired on Paramount+ but is not currently available as of 14 February 2022 due to the service losing streaming rights.

== See also ==
- American Survivor
- Australian Survivor
- British Survivor
- Survivor South Africa
- Treasure Island
