= Deal or No Deal Island =

American television reality game show

- Genre: Reality game show
- Inspired by: Deal or No Deal
- Directed by: Joe Guidry (2024); Richard Franc (2025)
- Presented by: Joe Manganiello
- Country of origin: United States
- Original language: English
- No. of seasons: 2
- No. of episodes: 24

Production
- Executive producers: Howie Mandel; Matt Kunitz; Jeffrey Breeden; Melissa Stokes; Matt Apps; Sarah Happel Jackson; Sharon Levy; DJ Nurre; Sean Loughlin; Vittoria Cacciatore; Michael Heyerman; Kevin Lee; Joe Manganiello
- Production location: Panama
- Running time: 44–88 minutes
- Production companies: Alevy Productions; Pulse Creative; Endemol Shine North America

Original release
- Network: NBC
- Release: February 26, 2024 – March 25, 2025

Related
- Deal or No Deal; International versions of Deal or No Deal

Deal or No Deal Island is an American reality competition series that aired on NBC from February 26, 2024, to March 25, 2025. Hosted by Joe Manganiello, it is a spin-off of the game show Deal or No Deal. The series was cancelled in December 2025 after two seasons.

The show features contestants competing in physical and mental challenges in an island setting to retrieve briefcases containing cash values. The winner of the challenge selects a contestant to play the "Banker's Challenge"—a game of Deal or No Deal where they must aim to make a "good" offer on their chosen briefcase to avoid elimination and to add money to a group prize pot. The last contestant remaining plays a high-stakes game of Deal or No Deal to determine their winnings, with the largest prize being a jackpot formed from the total value of the offers received throughout the season, which is valued upwards of $10,000,000.

== Format ==
Deal or No Deal Island is a reality competition in which a group of contestants compete in excursions to collect briefcases hidden across the Banker's private island, an undisclosed island in the Panama islands.

=== Excursions ===
Each episode, the contestants compete in Excursions and must undertake physical challenges to retrieve briefcases with varying cash values. Certain challenges may include "red cases," which either permit a contestant to seize another player's briefcase or contain a minimal cash amount. Contestants securing the lowest-valued briefcases are deemed at risk and may be selected to face the Banker's Challenge. The contestant or team gathering the highest combined case value gains immunity for that evening and determines which lower-ranking contestant will confront the Banker.

=== Banker's Temple ===
The Banker's Temple is a conventional high-stakes game of Deal or No Deal between the Banker and the player chosen to compete by the winner of the Excursion. In each round, the player must open one or more cases, revealing their values and eliminating them from play. At the end of the round, the Banker presents the player with an offer. The player then chooses to accept the offer and end the game or reject the offer and keep playing.

If the player accepts an offer higher than the value in their chosen case, or if they play through every round and their case is higher than the Banker's final offer, they remain in the game and must eliminate one of the other players. Otherwise, the player is eliminated. Regardless of the outcome, the amount of the accepted offer (or the player's case, if the game is played to its conclusion) is added to the value of the Final Case, a prize pot that grows after each game of Deal or No Deal that the last surviving player will play for in one last game of Deal or No Deal in the season finale. If the player gets a record breaking offer from the Banker, they may, at their discretion, offer a cash bonus that the player can keep regardless of the outcome of the Banker's Temple or the overall competition. In some cases, if the player accepts this bonus, they must leave the game immediately.

=== End Game ===
In the end, the final few contestants compete in a series of challenges to determine the winner who earns the right to play a high stakes game of Deal or No Deal to determine their prize. However, this game is played with the Banker present in-person. While the bottom half of the board has values less than $1,000, the top half of the board consists entirely of cases containing $1 million or more, including the largest cases found during each Excursion. The highest valued case was the total of the amounts won in all Banker's Challenges of the season, which in resulted in a top case valued at nearly $14 million in season 1, just over $12 million in season 2.

In the first season, the banker was revealed to be Howie Mandel, the original host of Deal or No Deal. In the second season, Mandel appeared in a special message in the first episode to pass on the role to a new banker. The banker was addressed with feminine pronouns throughout the season. On March 21, 2025, the banker was revealed to be Chrissy Teigen, who had been a briefcase model during the first season of the original Deal or No Deal series.

== Series overview ==
Season	Contestants	Episodes	Originally released		Winners	Prize
Season	Contestants	Episodes	First released	Last released	Winners	Prize
1	13	12	February 26, 2024	May 12, 2024	Jordan Fowler	$1,230,000
2	14	12	January 7, 2025	March 25, 2025	David Genat	$5,800,000

== Season 1 ==
=== Contestants ===
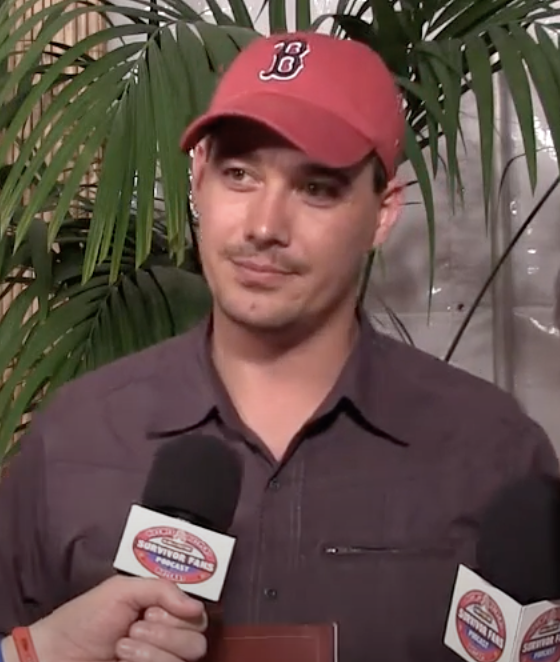
Rob Mariano

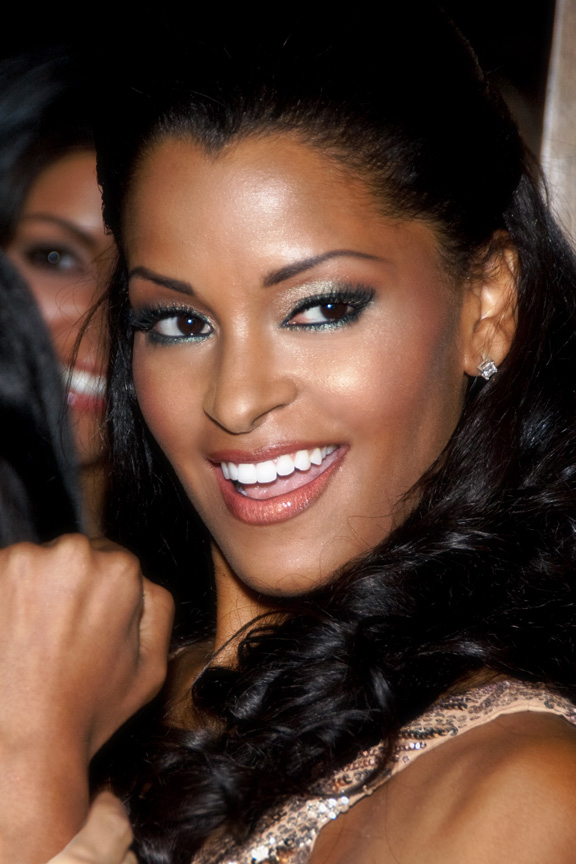
Claudia Jordan

The cast of 13 contestants includes familiar faces such as reality TV personality and former Deal or No Deal case model Claudia Jordan and former five-time Survivor contestant and two-time The Amazing Race contestant Rob Mariano.

Full Name	Age	Current City	Result	
Jordan Fowler	29	Nashville, Tennessee	Winner	Episode 12
Amy McCoy	42	Oklahoma City, Oklahoma	Eliminated by competition	Episode 12
Stephanie Mitchell	41	Gainesville, Alabama	Eliminated by competition	Episode 12
Rob Mariano	47	Perdido Key, Florida	Eliminated by competition	Episode 12
Aron Barbell	26	Champaign, Illinois	Eliminated by Bad Deal	Episode 10
Nick Grasso	29	Brooklyn, New York	Eliminated by Bad Deal	Episode 9
Dawson Addis	25	Muskego, Wisconsin	Bribed Out of Game (Note: At the Banker's Temple, Dawson accepted an offer of $1,399,000 for the final case in addition to a $100,000 personal offer as a bribe to immediately leave the game. Even if the personal offer had not been made, Dawson would have been eliminated regardless, as the Banker's offer was ultimately a Bad Deal.)	Episode 8
Alyssa Klinzing	26	Kansas City, Missouri	Eliminated by Stephanie	Episode 7
Miranda Harrison	30	Fort Myers, Florida	Eliminated by Bad Deal	Episode 5
Kim Mattina	63	Anthem, Arizona	Eliminated by Rob	Episode 4
Claudia Jordan	50	Dallas, Texas	Eliminated by Bad Deal	Episode 3
Jamil Sipes	47	Grand Prairie, Texas	Eliminated by Kim	Episode 2
Brantzen Wong	31	Tustin, California	Eliminated by Aron	Episode 1

=== Future appearances ===
In 2025, Rob Mariano competed on the third season of the Peacock reality TV series The Traitors.

=== Episodes ===
No. overall	No. in season	Title	Original release date	Prod. code	U.S. viewers (millions)	Rating (18–49)
1	1	"Are You a Gambler?"	February 26, 2024	101	3.10	0.4
2	2	"Are You Calculating?"	March 4, 2024	102	2.52	0.3
3	3	"Are You Fearless?"	March 11, 2024	103	2.87	0.3
4	4	"Are You Intuitive?"	March 18, 2024	104	2.88	0.3
5	5	"Are You Trustworthy?"	March 25, 2024	105	2.58	0.3
6	6	"Are You Intentional?"	April 1, 2024	106	2.40	0.3
7	7	"Are You Decisive?"	April 8, 2024	107	2.42	0.3
8	8	"Are You Meticulous?"	April 15, 2024	108	2.69	0.3
9	9	"Are You Ruthless?"	April 22, 2024	109	2.64	0.3
10	10	"Are You Powerful?"	April 29, 2024	110	2.52	0.3
11	11	"Are You Tenacious?"	May 6, 2024	111	3.03	0.3
12	12	"Can You Beat the Banker?"	May 13, 2024	112	3.14	0.3

=== Elimination chart ===
Color key:

Overall Winner
Excursion Winner
Bottom Player
Good Deal
Bad Deal
Eliminated

Elimination History (Season 1)
Contestant	Ep 1	Ep 2	Ep 3	Ep 4	Ep 5	Ep 6 (Note: Episode 6 was a non-elimination episode due to a special case retrieved by Amy during the Excursion and opened by Aron at the Banker's Temple.)	Ep 7	Ep 8	Ep 9	Ep 10	Ep 11/12 (Note: Episode 11 ended on a cliffhanger without revealing which two contestants were eliminated during that episode's sudden death challenge.)	Ep 12
Banked	$600,000	$225,000	$180,000	$49,000	$937,000	$850,000	$251,000	$1,399,000	$4,417,000	$1,199,000	None	$3,750,000
Final Case	$600,000	$825,000	$1,005,000	$1,054,000	$1,991,000	$2,841,000	$3,092,000	$4,491,000	$8,908,000	$10,107,000	$10,107,000	$13,857,000
Jordan	SAFE	SAFE	SAFE	SAFE	SAFE	SAFE	SAFE	SAFE	WIN	SAFE	SAFE	WINNER (Note: As the last contestant left standing, Jordan played a standard Deal or No Deal game with 22 cases. 11 of these cases were worth $1 million or more: the values of these cases were determined by the top case obtained at each Excursion throughout the season. The top case was the final case value, worth $13,857,000. Jordan accepted one of the Banker's offers and won $1,230,000, which was a Good Deal, as her case was worth $1,000.)
Amy	SAFE	SAFE	SAFE	WIN	SAFE	DEAL	RISK	RISK	WIN	WIN	SAFE	ELIM
Stephanie	SAFE	SAFE	SAFE	RISK	SAFE	WIN	DEAL	SAFE	RISK	SAFE	ELIM	
Rob	SAFE	WIN	WIN	DEAL	SAFE	WIN	WIN	SAFE	SAFE	SAFE	ELIM	
Aron	DEAL	WIN	RISK	SAFE	WIN	RISK	SAFE	RISK	SAFE	OUT		
Nick	SAFE	SAFE	SAFE	RISK	SAFE	SAFE	WIN	WIN	OUT			
Dawson	RISK	SAFE	SAFE	RISK	SAFE	SAFE	SAFE	OUT (Note: At the Banker's Temple, Dawson accepted an offer of $1,399,000 for the final case in addition to a $100,000 personal offer as a bribe to immediately leave the game. Even if the personal offer had not been made, Dawson would have been eliminated regardless, as the Banker's offer was ultimately a Bad Deal.)				
Alyssa	SAFE	RISK	SAFE	SAFE	RISK	SAFE	ELIM					
Miranda	SAFE	SAFE	SAFE	SAFE	OUT (Note: At the Banker's Temple, Miranda accepted an offer of $937,000 for the final case in addition to a personal offer of $40,000, which was hers to keep no matter the outcome. As Miranda's case contained the $1,500,000 value, her offer was a Bad Deal, and she was eliminated.)							
Kim	WIN	DEAL	SAFE	ELIM								
Claudia	SAFE	SAFE	OUT									
Jamil	SAFE	ELIM										
Brantzen	ELIM											

=== Cheating ===
- In the first part of the two-part finale of Season 1, Episode 11 (S1E11), the final four contestants were challenged to navigate through the Banker's Garden, a jungle maze, to locate and retrieve briefcases of undisclosed value. The task commenced with a riddle-solving challenge that would grant access to a map pinpointing the briefcases' locations. Amy solved the riddle first and entered the maze. Subsequently, Rob violated the game's rules by looking at Amy's game board for the riddle's solution. This infraction prompted an immediate intervention by host Joe Manganiello, who paused the game to address the breach. Despite the violation, Rob was permitted to continue participating in the challenge but was assessed a time penalty determined by the duration of time between Amy and the next finisher entering the maze, which was ultimately three minutes. This penalty required him to wait until all other contestants had started their maze excursions before his penalty timer commenced.

== Season 2 ==
=== Contestants ===
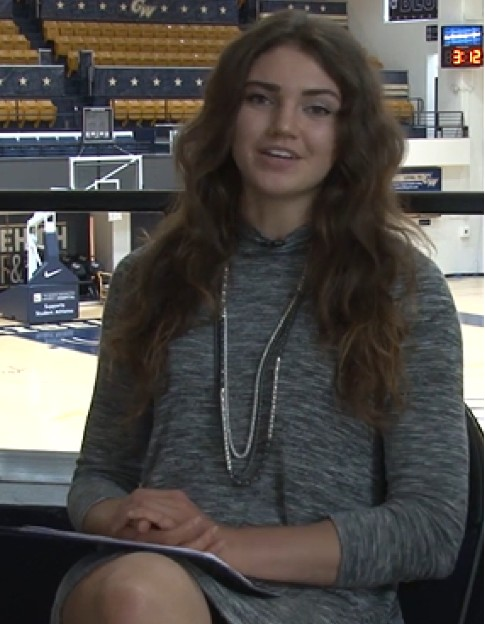
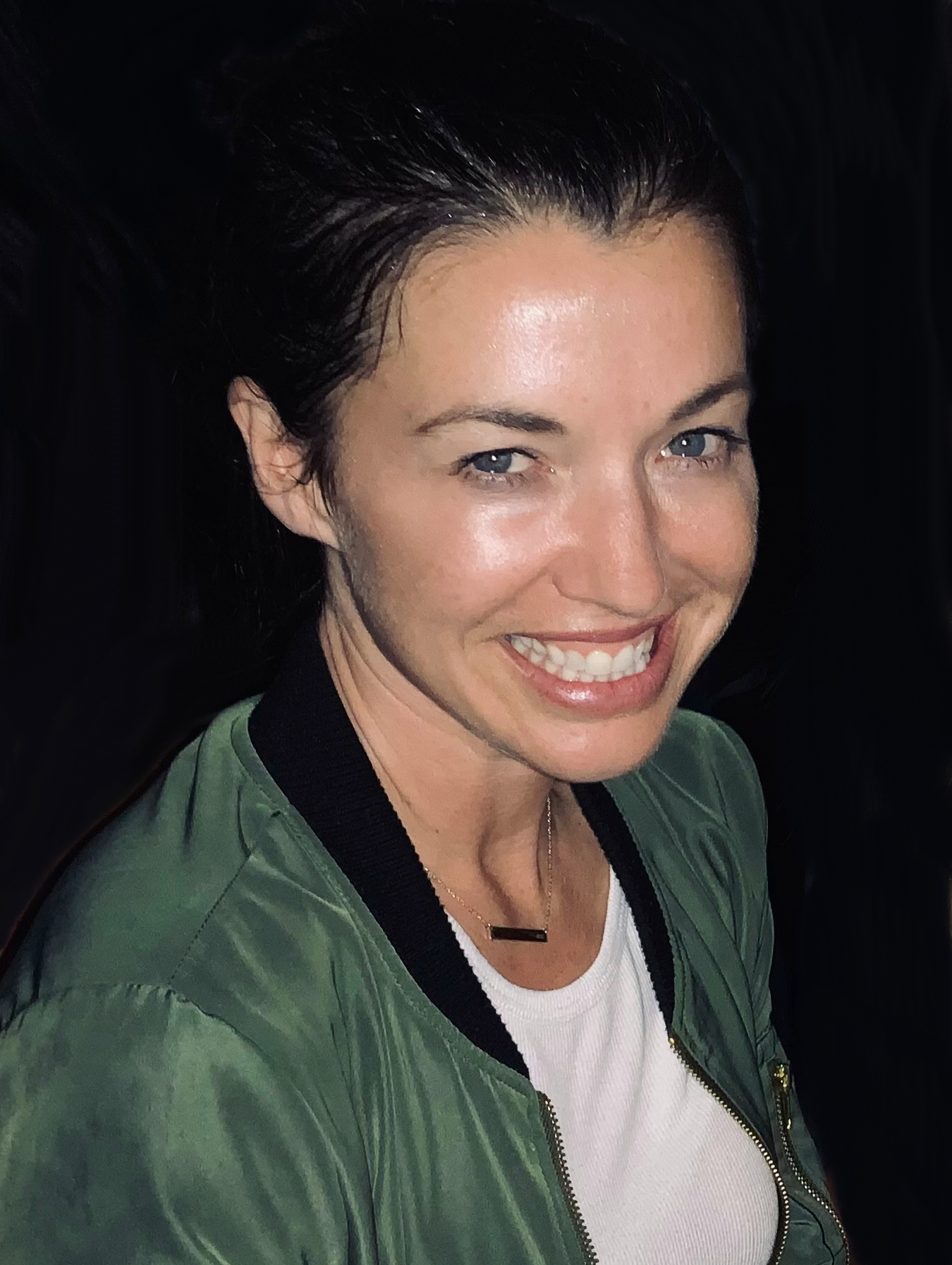
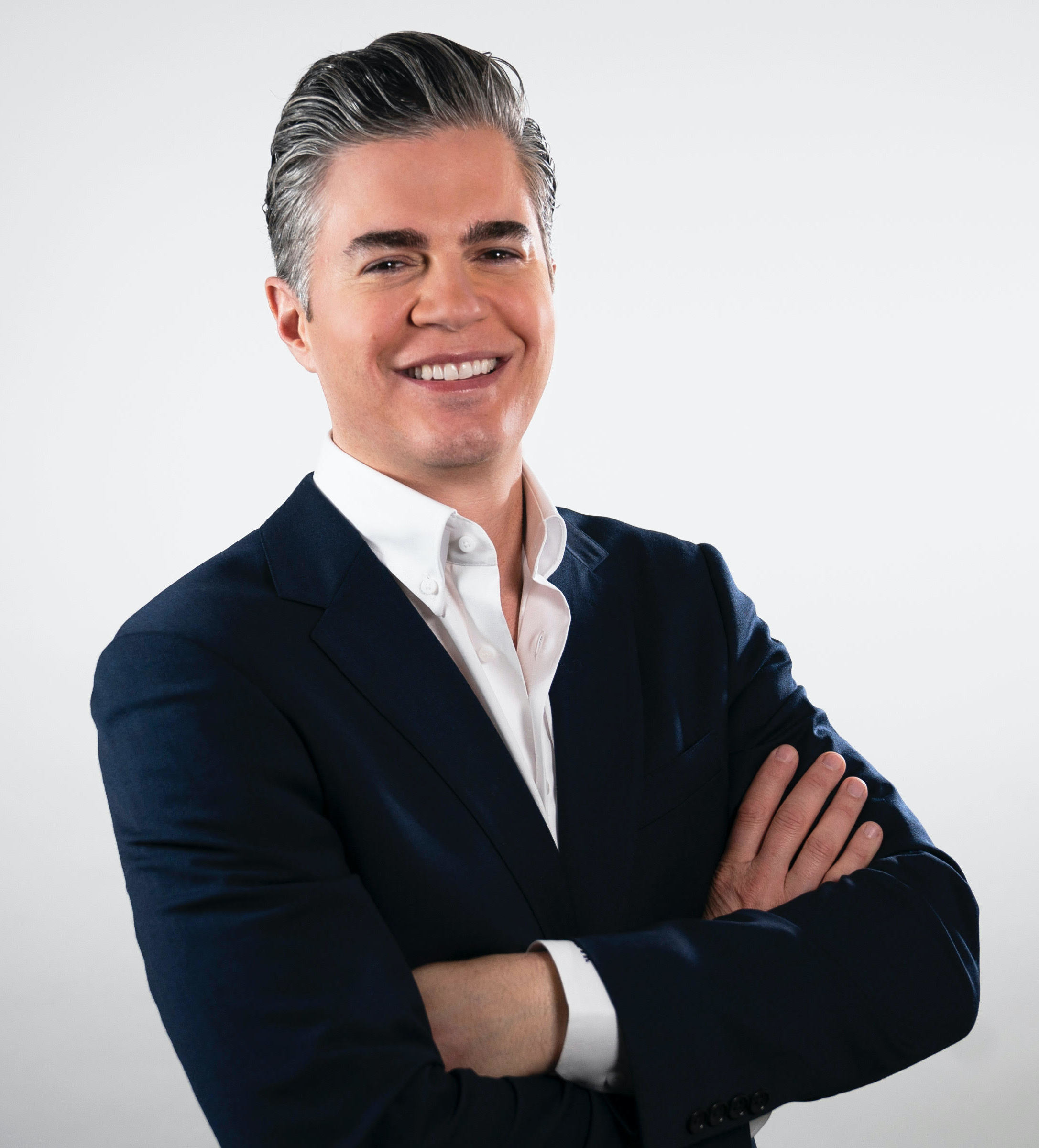
From left to right: Alexis Lete, Parvati Shallow, and Will Kirby

The cast of 14 contestants was revealed on the October 10, 2024, and includes three former reality TV champions, including two-time Australian Survivor contestant David Genat, four-time Survivor contestant Parvati Shallow, and two-time Big Brother contestant Dr. Will Kirby.

Full Name	Age	Current City	Result	
David Genat	44	Perth, Australia	Winner	Episode 12
Alexis Lete	27	Louisville, Kentucky	Eliminated by competition	Episode 12
Courtney "C.K." Kim	36	Charlotte, North Carolina	Eliminated by competition	Episode 11
Parvati Shallow	41	Los Angeles, California	Eliminated by Bad Deal	Episode 11
Phillip Solomon	37	Austin, Texas	Eliminated by David	Episode 10
Dickson Wong	24	Wood River, Illinois	Eliminated by Lete	Episode 9
La Shell Wooten	55	Chapel Hill, North Carolina	Eliminated by Bad Deal	Episode 8
Will Kirby (Note: Will entered the game after Episode 2's Banker's Challenge.)	51	Los Angeles, California	Eliminated by David	Episode 7
Seychelle Cordero	31	Staten Island, New York	Eliminated by C.K.	Episode 7
Maria-Grace "M.G." Cook	21	Greer, South Carolina	Eliminated by Will	Episode 5
Storm Wilson	25	Austin, Texas	Eliminated by Dickson	Episode 4
Rock Carlson	65	Henderson, Nevada	Eliminated by Bad Deal	Episode 3
Sydnee Peck	27	Redondo Beach, California	Eliminated by C.K. & La Shell	Episode 2
Luke Olejniczak	29	Eagle River, Wisconsin	Eliminated by Bad Deal	Episode 1

=== Future appearances ===
In 2025, David Genat and Parvati Shallow competed on Survivor: Australia V The World.

In 2026, Alexis Lete competed on The Challenge: Cutthroat.

=== Episodes ===
No. overall	No. in season	Title	Original release date	Prod. code	U.S. viewers (millions)	Rating (18–49)
13	1	"The Banker Strikes Back"	January 7, 2025	201	2.73	0.3
14	2	"Where There's a Will There's a Way"	January 14, 2025	202	1.92	0.2
15	3	"Chain of Command"	January 21, 2025	203	2.01	0.2
16	4	"Throw and Tell"	January 28, 2025	204	1.78	0.2
17	5	"Trust Fall"	February 4, 2025	205	1.85	0.2
18	6	"Power Grab"	February 11, 2025	206	2.11	0.3
19	7	"Snakes in the Grass"	February 18, 2025	207	2.10	0.3
20	8	"Safety in Numbers"	February 25, 2025	208	2.10	0.3
21	9	"Million Dollar Walk"	March 4, 2025	209	2.42	0.2
22	10	"Money to Burn"	March 11, 2025	210	1.90	0.2
23	11	"Water Under the Bridge"	March 18, 2025	211	2.12	0.2
24	12	"The Final Deal"	March 25, 2025	212	2.55	0.2

=== Elimination chart ===
Color key:

Overall Winner
Excursion Winner
Bottom Player
Good Deal
Bad Deal
Eliminated

Elimination History (Season 2)
Contestant	Ep 1	Ep 2 (Note: As part of the Banker's Bonus Case being taken during the Excursion, the bottom two teams faced possible elimination. As winning team, Parvati and Phillip had to choose one of the two teams to face the Banker. If the outcome was a Good Deal, then the two chosen players had to eliminate one of the other two players at risk. If the outcome was a Bad Deal, then the opposing team had to eliminate one of the two chosen players. C.K. & La Shell were chosen to play the Banker, and they made a Good Deal. They decided to eliminate Sydnee.)	Ep 3	Ep 4	Ep 5	Ep 6/7 (Note: Episode 6 left off on a cliffhanger without revealing whether or not C.K. chose to take the offer or keep the final case.)	Ep 7	Ep 8	Ep 9	Ep 10/11 (Note: Episode 10 left off on a cliffhanger without revealing who David chose to face the Banker.)	Ep 11/12 (Note: Episode 11 left off on a cliffhanger without revealing who won the final Excursion.)
Banked	$1	$281,000	$250,000	$5,000,000	$168,000	$925,000	$999,999	$1,558,000	$550,000	$500,001	$2,000,000 (Note: After the final case, the Banker announced that the largest case found on the excursion ($2,000,000) would be added to the final case.)
Final Case	$1	$281,001	$531,001	$5,531,001	$5,699,001	$6,624,001	$7,624,000	$9,182,000	$9,732,000	$10,232,001	$12,232,001
David	RISK	SAFE	RISK	RISK	SAFE	SAFE	DEAL	SAFE	WIN	WIN (Note: For winning the Excursion, David had to choose one of the three bottom players to be eliminated immediately. Then, he had to choose one of the remaining two bottom players to face the Banker. He chose Phillip to be eliminated and Parvati to face the Banker.)	WINNER (Note: As the last contestant left standing, David played a standard Deal or No Deal game with 26 cases. 7 of these cases were worth $1 million or more. The top case was the final case value of $12,232,001. David accepted one of the Banker's offers and won $5,800,000, which was a Good Deal, as his case was worth $75.)
Lete	SAFE	SAFE	RISK	RISK	WIN	WIN	WIN	RISK	DEAL	RISK	ELIM
C.K.	SAFE	DEAL	WIN	RISK	RISK	DEAL	SAFE	RISK	RISK	RISK	ELIM
Parvati	SAFE	WIN	SAFE	SAFE	SAFE	SAFE	SAFE	WIN	SAFE	OUT	
Phillip	SAFE	WIN	SAFE	RISK	RISK	SAFE	SAFE	RISK	RISK	ELIM	
Dickson	SAFE	SAFE	RISK	DEAL	SAFE	RISK	RISK	RISK	ELIM		
La Shell	SAFE	DEAL	RISK	RISK	RISK	RISK	SAFE	OUT			
Will	N/A (Note: Will entered the game after Episode 2's Banker's Temple because Parvati and Phillip took the Banker's Bonus Case during the Excursion.)		RISK	WIN	DEAL	SAFE	ELIM				
Seychelle	RISK	SAFE	RISK	SAFE	SAFE	ELIM					
Maria-Grace	SAFE	SAFE	WIN	SAFE	ELIM						
Storm	SAFE	SAFE	RISK	ELIM							
Rock	SAFE	RISK	OUT								
Sydnee	WIN	ELIM									
Luke	OUT										

== Production ==
On May 12, 2023, NBC ordered the series. On September 27, 2023, it was announced that Joe Manganiello would host the show. On November 20, 2023, it was announced that the series would premiere on February 26, 2024. On January 8, 2024, the contestants were announced. On May 7, 2024, the series was renewed for a second season. The second season premiered on January 7, 2025.

On December 2, 2025, it was reported that Deal or No Deal Island had been cancelled by NBC after two seasons and that Endemol Shine North America was focusing on shopping a revival of the original Deal or No Deal.

== Reception ==
=== Critical response ===
Writing for The Daily Beast, Fletcher Peters felt that Deal or No Deal Island was a "welcome twist on the original romp" and was "easy" to watch, but that the overall format was a "dreamlike, messy, absurdist concept" that felt like a 30 Rock gag, and that she would have preferred a reboot of the original Deal or No Deal instead.

Andy Dehnart was more critical, considering it "an awkward marriage of two different formats" that "tip[ped] way too much toward Deal or No Deal for my taste", panning the length of the Banker's Challenge segments (albeit admitting that he was not as much of a fan of Deal or No Deal to begin with due to its pacing), and the quality of its editing.

== International broadcast ==
- In Australia, the first season was made available to stream on 10Play in December 2024, accompanying Network 10's recent revival of the Australian version of Deal or No Deal. The second season (which featured David Genat of Australian Survivor, which is also broadcast by the network) was made available on the same day as the American airing.
- In Singapore, the first season of the series premiered on Mediacorp Channel 5 along with its video-on-demand platform meWatch from February 12, 2025, nearly a year after its premiere.
- In India, the first season is also made available to stream on Lionsgate Play on 6 February 2026.
