= Will Kirby =

American Big Brother winner

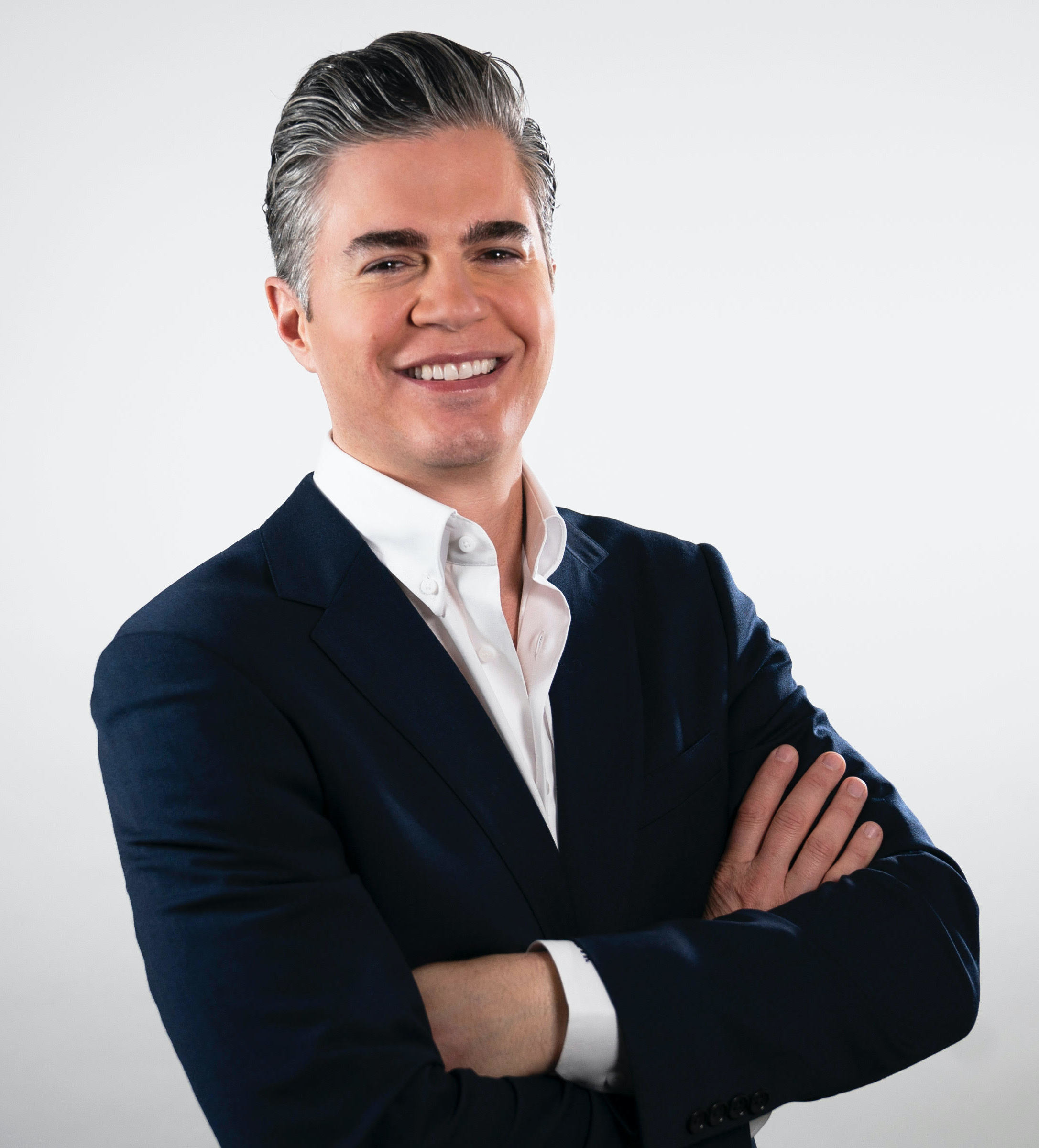
- Kirby in 2020
- Born: William Terence Kirby; January 2, 1973 (age 53); Florence, Italy
- Education: Emory University (BS); Nova Southeastern University (DO)
- Occupations: Dermatologist, physician, spokesman, television personality
- Television: Big Brother 2 (winner); Big Brother 7 The Price Is Right (winner); The Book of Boba Fett; Dr. 90210; The Doctors; Deal or No Deal Island
- Spouse: Erin Brodie (m. 2017; div. 2022)
- Children: 2
- Father: David Kirby

William Terence Kirby (born January 2, 1973), popularly known as Dr. Will, is an American aesthetic dermatologist, an associate clinical professor of dermatology, and a reality television personality. He is known for winning the CBS reality show Big Brother 2 as well as winning The Price Is Right and appearing on the Star Wars television series The Book of Boba Fett as Karales the Bounty Hunter.

== Early life ==
Kirby was born on January 2, 1973, in Florence, Italy. He attended kindergarten in Paris, France and spent time in his youth in Tallahassee, Florida, where he graduated from Florida State University School in 1991.

== Medical career ==
In 1995, Kirby received his degree in biology from Emory University. He received his medical degree from Nova Southeastern University College of Osteopathic Medicine in 2000. He is the Chief Medical Officer at LaserAway, an aesthetic dermatology group. Kirby lectures at national medical conventions and has published dermatology articles in The Journal of Cosmetic Dermatology, is an expert in the field of laser tattoo removal, and authored the first predictive scale to assess the number of laser treatments to remove a tattoo (Kirby-Desai Scale). He has also authored and co-authored medical textbook chapters regarding lasers and their implications as well as medicolegal considerations and medical ethics. Kirby served as the national spokesman for Johnson & Johnson's Neutrogena Dermatologics where he appeared live on QVC.

== Entertainment career ==
Kirby won the second season of CBS's Big Brother in 2001. He also returned for Big Brother: All-Stars (the seventh season), in which he was evicted on Day 65, finishing in 4th place. He also briefly served as a medical correspondent for Extra!. In 2002, he hosted a dating show for NBC called Love Shack. In 2005, he appeared on six episodes of Bravo's Battle of The Network Reality Stars and appeared on two seasons of Dr. 90210. He has also appeared on The Young and the Restless, Regis & Kelly, The Talk, LA Ink, Chelsea Lately, The Traitors, and has made several appearances on The Doctors as himself. Kirby has recorded voices for a season eight episode of Adult Swim's Robot Chicken where he played an animated physician and he appeared in two seasons of Then and Now on Bravo. In 2019, Kirby was named as the health and beauty reporter for pop culture magazine Life and Style. In 2022, he plays "Karales the Bounty Hunter" on the Star Wars television series The Book of Boba Fett. In 2025, he appeared on the second season of Deal or No Deal Island, joining in the second episode as part of a twist and becoming a regular contestant starting in the third episode. Upon his elimination in the seventh episode, he officially announced his retirement from reality television.In December 2025 he appeared in the "TV doctor" episode of Celebrity Weakest Link where he played a near-perfect game (only missed 1 question) but was voted out by the other remaining players in the final round.

== Personal life ==
Kirby's father is American poet, David Kirby. In 2011, Kirby became engaged to Erin Brodie, two-time winner of the reality series For Love or Money and daughter of former NFL player John Brodie. They married in 2017. Kirby and Brodie have two children: their son was born in 2010 and in 2012 Brodie gave birth to the couple's daughter. They divorced in 2022.

Kirby is the caretaker of a bicephalid Trachemys scripta elegans (two-headed turtle).

| Preceded by Eddie McGee | Big Brother U.S. winner Season 2 (2001) | Succeeded by Lisa Donahue |
