= Somali Canadians =

Canadians of Somali origin

Total population
- 65,555 (official Census figure)

Regions with significant populations
- Toronto; Ottawa; Calgary; Edmonton; Vancouver; Winnipeg; Hamilton; Windsor; London

Languages
- Somali; Canadian English; Canadian French

Religion
- Predominantly Sunni Islam

Related ethnic groups
- Somali Americans, Ethiopian Canadians, Eritrean Canadians, Ethiopian Americans, Eritrean Americans

Somali Canadians are Canadians of Somali origin or are dual Somali and Canadian nationality.

== Overview ==
Early Somali arrivals in Canada started in the 1970s, for education, returning to the Somali regions, or going to other parts of the world, after graduation from university or college. There would be a few that would remain in Canada. Most Somalis arrived in Canada between the late 1980s and the early 1990s as refugees from Somalia, with some secondary migration from the United States.

However, it wasn't until the Somali government collapsed in 1991 that the majority of Somalis from Somalia escaping violence and famine in other parts of the country arrived in Canada, increasing the Somali population in Canada from 1,000 to 11,000 in just one year. According to Statistics Canada, there are 62,550 persons of Somali origins spread across Canada, with Toronto and Edmonton being the largest enclaves. Of these, 8,315 are recent immigrants and 37,115 live in Somali-speaking households.

16,030 of Horn Of Africa born residents have Canadian citizenship, 1,655 are citizens of Canada and at least one other country, and 5,115 are not Canadian citizens. Many Somali-Canadians from Somalia, Somaliland, Kenya, Ethiopia, and Djibouti have returned to their countries of origin to participate in entrepreneurial activities. Also, following international involvement and a somewhat improved security situation in Somalia in 2012, many Somali residents of Canada have begun returning to Mogadishu and other parts of their country of birth for investment opportunities and to take part in the ongoing post-conflict reconstruction process. Participating in the renovation of schools, hospitals, roads and other infrastructure, they have played a leading role in their capital's recovery and have also helped propel the local real estate market.

In recent years, there have been efforts made at the provincial level to formally recognize the Somali Canadian community's cultural contributions. In 2020, MLA Uzoma Asagwara was able to pass a bill marking Somali Heritage Week in the Legislative Assembly of Manitoba.

== Social disadvantages ==
As with many other immigrant groups in Canada, Somalis have faced some barriers to employment despite including many qualified professionals. This has been attributed to enclave economies, self-employment, language unfamiliarity, and various public policies and social programs.

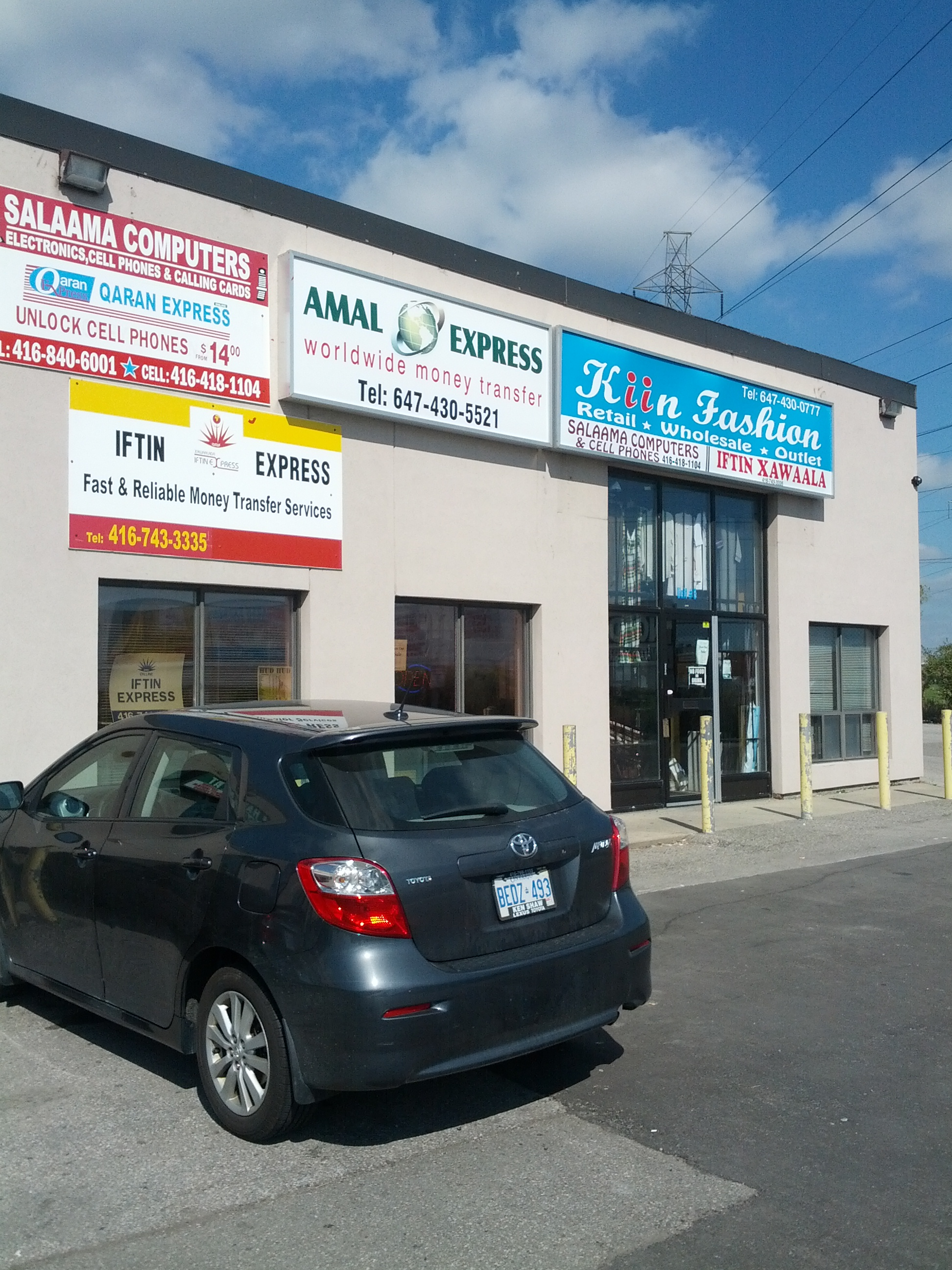
Electronic, money transfer and wholesale stores at a Somali mall in Toronto

To address the issue, in 2010 the Canadian government, in coordination with the Somali Canadian Education and Rural Development Organization's Somali Youth Skills Project, set up job-preparation training and work experience programs for local Somali youth. Part of the Canadian government's Youth Employment Strategy, this initiative is intended to help young Somalis facing employment challenges to better access career information, develop skills, gain relevant work experience, find jobs and stay employed.

== Demographics ==
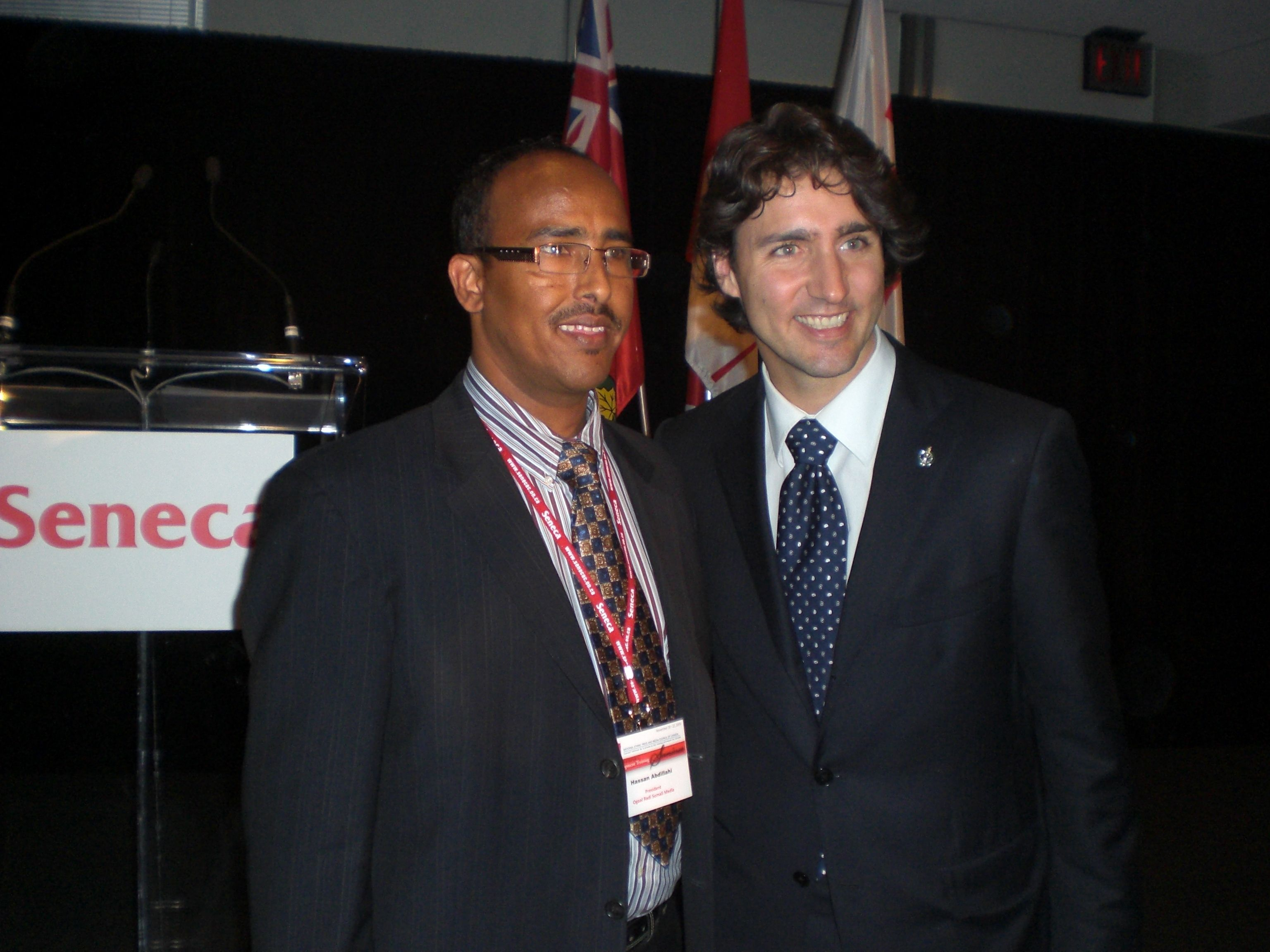
Journalist Hassan Abdillahi of Ogaal Radio with then MP Justin Trudeau at Seneca College (2009).

According to the 2016 National Census, 62,550 people in Canada reported Somali ancestry. Of those, 37,115 were Somali language speakers and 4,315 were recent immigrants.

Somalis tend to be concentrated in southern Ontario, especially in Ottawa and Toronto. Calgary and Edmonton, in Alberta, have also seen a significant increase in their respective Somali communities. The neighbourhood of Rexdale in Toronto has one of the largest Somali populations in Canada.

Records from the 2011 National Household Survey show that 28,475 Somalis in Canada aged 15 years and over are eligible for the labour force. Of these individuals, 15,220 are in the labour force (12,025 employed and 3,195 unemployed), and 13,255 are not in the labour force. The labour force participation rate is 53.5%, with an employment rate of 42% and an unemployment rate of 21%. In terms of class of worker in the labour force, 12,355 are employees and 1,070 are self-employed.

The most common occupations are sales and service occupations (4,590), trades, transport and equipment operators and related occupations (2,125), occupations in education, law and social, community and government services (1,860), business, finance and administration occupations (1,685), health occupations (835), natural and applied sciences and related occupations (705), management occupations (685), occupations in manufacturing and utilities (570), occupations in art, culture, recreation and sport (235), and natural resources, agriculture and related production occupations (135).

Official correctional figures at the population level for Somali residents are uncertain since Canadian law enforcement is prohibited from compiling ethnicity-based crime statistics. The SCYM non-profit organization estimates that over people in the community have died from gun violence in the period between 2005 and 2016.

According to the 2011 NHS, the average income of the Somali Canadian population aged 15 years and over is $24,182. This income falls within brackets of under $5,000 (4,370 individuals), $5,000 to $9,999 (2,950 individuals), $10,000 to $14,999 (3,000 individuals), $15,000 to $19,999 (2,945 individuals), $20,000 to $29,999 (3,690 individuals), $30,000 to $39,999 (2,695 individuals), $40,000 to $49,999 (1,620 individuals), $50,000 to $59,999 (890 individuals), $60,000 to $79,999 (975 individuals), $80,000 to $99,999 (460 individuals), $100,000 to $124,999 (185 individuals), and $125,000 and over (155 individuals). The composition of total income for individuals aged 15 years and over primarily consists of market income (66.3%), which includes employment income (62.3%), investment income (1.2%), retirement pensions, superannuation and annuities (1%), and other money income (1.9%). Government transfer payments (33.6%) comprise the remainder of the total income, and consist of Canada/Quebec pension plan benefits (0.9%), old age security pensions and guaranteed income supplement (1.4%), employment insurance benefits (2.3%), child benefits (13.1%), and other government transfer income (15.9%). After-tax income represents around 90.3% of total income, with 9.7% of total income paid in income taxes.

== Education ==
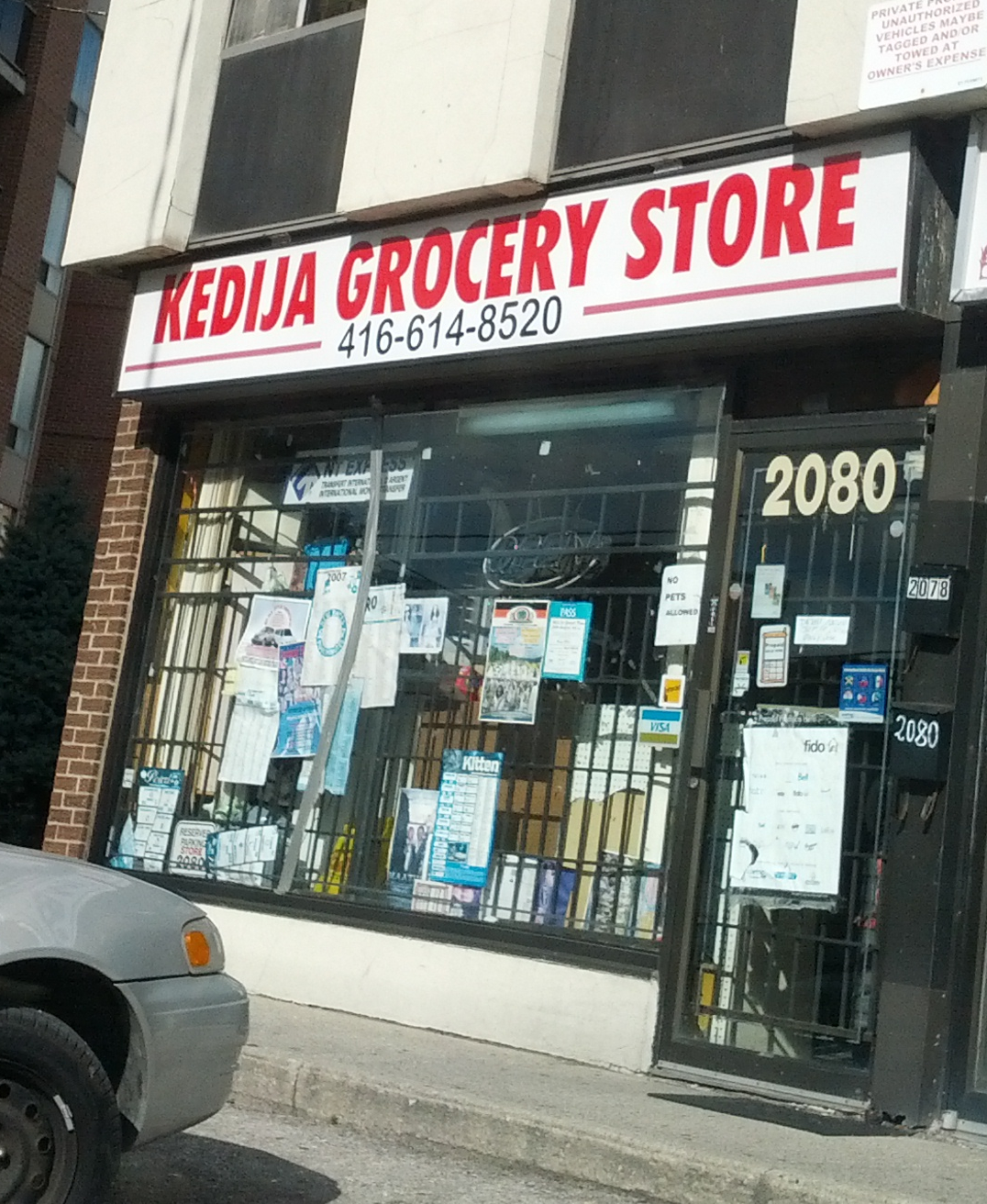
A Somali grocery store in Toronto.

As of 2015, most Somali elementary and secondary students in Canada attend schools under the Toronto District School Board. According to the TDSB, Somali-speaking pupils in Grades 7 and 8 have a reading achievement of 13% in Level 0 or 1 compared with a TDSB student average of 6%, of 33% in Level 2 compared with a student average of 22%, and of 54% in Level 3 or 4 compared with a student average of 72%; a writing achievement of 12% in Level 0 or 1 compared with a student average of 7%, of 36% in Level 2 compared with a student average of 23%, and of 52% in Level 3 or 4 compared with a student average of 70%; and a mathematics achievement of 18% in Level 0 or 1 compared with a student average of 10%, of 31% in Level 2 compared with a student average of 20%, and of 51% in Level 3 or 4 compared with a student average of 70%. 25% of Somali-speaking pupils in Grade 9 completed fewer than eight credits by the end of the 2011–2012 school year compared with a student average of 15%, whereas 63% of Somali-speaking students completed the Ontario Secondary School Literacy Test compared with 73% of all first-time eligible TDSB pupils.

Somali-speaking students in Grades 9 and 10 attended each program of study at approximately the same proportion as the TDSB student average, taking most academic and applied courses at a similar rate. Somali-speaking students in the 2008 Grade 9 cohort had a graduation rate of 80%, close to the general pupil rate of 83% and the English-speaking student rate of 78%. This was a 27% increase from the graduation rate of the Somali-speaking 2000 Grade 9 cohort.

61% of Somali-speaking students confirmed an offer of admission to an Ontario post-secondary institute, near the TDSB average of 66%. Of these, 41% of Somali-speaking students confirmed an offer to an Ontario university compared with 50% of general students, 20% confirmed an offer to an Ontario college compared with a pupil average of 16%, and 12% applied to a post-secondary institute but did not confirm compared with a student average of 10%. Overall, post-secondary confirmations for Somali-speaking pupils have risen 25% between the 2000-2005 Grade 9 cohort and the 2008-2013 Grade 9 cohort compared with a 10% increase for TDSB students; college and university confirmations are 7% and 17%, respectively, higher than in 2008 and non-applications are 18% lower.

According to the NHS, among Somali Canadians aged 25 to 64 years (17,315), 7,885 persons have a post-secondary diploma, degree or certificate. Of these individuals, 3,120 have a college, CEGEP or other non-university certificate or diploma, 2,975 have a university certificate, diploma or degree at bachelor level or above (2,085 with a bachelor's degree, and 890 with a university certificate, diploma or degree above bachelor level), 935 have an apprenticeship or trades certificate or diploma, and 855 have a university certificate or diploma below bachelor level. The remaining individuals have a high school diploma or equivalent (5,115), or no certificate, diploma or degree (4,315). Of the 28,475 persons aged 15 years or older, the major fields of study are business, management and public administration (2,230), health and related fields (1,840), social and behavioural sciences and law (1,425), architecture, engineering, and related technologies (1,380), mathematics, computer and information sciences (760), humanities (495), physical and life sciences and technologies (455), personal, protective and transportation services (395), education (300), and agriculture, natural resources and conservation (150), and 18,885 have no recognized post-secondary certificate, diploma or degree. Among individuals with a post-secondary certificate, diploma or degree, 6,825 studied at an institute within Canada (6,115 in their province or territory of residence, and 710 in another province or territory), and 2,760 studied abroad.

== Organizations ==
The Somali community in Canada is represented by various Somali-run organizations. Ahmed Hussen chairs the Canadian Somali Congress, which works closely with national and regional authorities to strengthen civic relations. The Council of Somali Canadian People of Alberta oversees the Somali community organizations in Alberta. Among these are the Somali Canadian Cultural Society of Edmonton (SCCSE), which provides social, educational, recreational, cultural and religious programs and services to the Somali community in Edmonton. The Somali Youth Association of Toronto/Somali Youth Coalition (SOYAT) offers various social, recreational and educational programs for Somali youth to inculcate volunteerism and leadership. It also organizes the annual Somali Youth Recognition Awards, which recognize the achievements of and contributions made to the Somali community by individual Somali youngsters.

The Canadian Somali Congress also teamed up with local Jewish community organizations in Ottawa and Toronto to offer mentorship opportunities to young Somali university students and professionals. The program spanned two years and took place in various major cities across the country, partnering 130 experienced Jewish-Canadian mentors with 18- to 25-year-old Somali-Canadians.

== Notable individuals ==
=== Academics ===
- Ali A. Abdi, sociologist
- Mohamed Diriye Abdullahi, writer, scholar and linguist
- Linda Suleiman, Assistant Dean, Feinberg School of Medicine

=== Athletes ===
- Mohammed Ahmed, long distance runner
- Anwar Hared, ice hockey and bandy player
- Ali Musse, soccer player
- Mohamed Omar, soccer player
- Abd-El-Aziz Yousef, soccer player

=== Media and journalism ===
- Hassan Abdillahi, journalist
- Ahmed Abdisalam Adan, radio journalist and politician
- Hodan Nalayeh, media executive and entrepreneur
- Ali Iman Sharmarke, radio journalist

=== Musicians ===
- Cold Specks, singer-songwriter
- Faarrow, pop group
- K'naan, rapper and singer
- Mocky, multi-instrumentalist and producer
- OBUXUM electronic musician
- Puffy L’z, rapper

=== Models ===
- Sumaya Dalmar, model and trans rights activist
- Ubah Hassan, model
- Yasmin Warsame, model
- Sabrina Dhowre, model

=== Poets ===
- Hawa Jibril, Buraanbur poet
- Knowmadic, poet, youth activist
- Mohamud Siad Togane, poet and peace activist
- Shadya Yasin, social activist, poet and teacher

=== Politicians ===
- Abdiweli Sheikh Ahmed, economist, diplomat and politician, former Prime Minister of Somalia
- Ahmed Isse Awad, diplomat and politician, former Foreign Minister
- Ali Duale, MLA for Halifax Armdale
- Abdihakim Mohamoud Haji-Faqi, diplomat and politician, former Defence Minister of Somalia
- Faisal Hassan, MPP for York South—Weston
- Ahmed Hussen, MP for York South—Weston, cabinet minister
- Sarah Jama, Independent MPP for Hamilton Centre and disability rights advocate

=== Other ===
- Abdullahi Afrah, leader, Islamic Courts Union
- Nasra Agil, civil engineer and entrepreneur
- Amin Amir, cartoonist and painter
- Ebyan Mahamed Salah, diplomat

== See also ==
- Somali Americans
- Somali diaspora
