= Amanda Lindhout =

Journalist and humanitarian (born 1981)

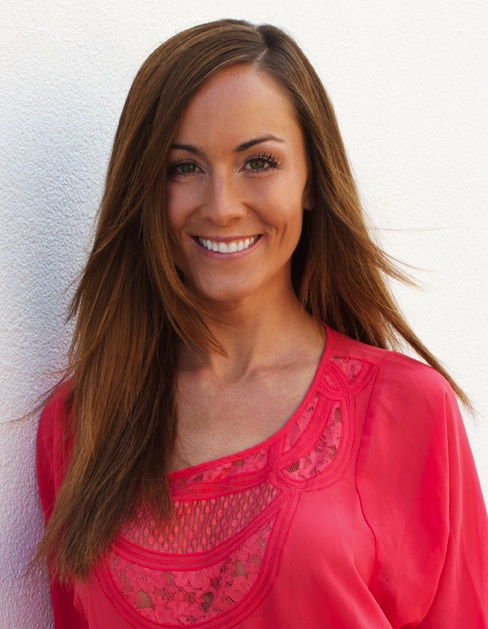
- Born: June 12, 1981 (age 45); Red Deer, Alberta, Canada
- Occupations: Journalist, humanitarian, author
- Organization: Global Enrichment Foundation
- Awards: 2014 CBC Bookie Award for Best Canadian Nonfiction Doctor of Laws, honoris causa (University of Lethbridge)
- Website: amandalindhout.com

Amanda Lindhout (born June 12, 1981) is a Canadian humanitarian and journalist. On August 23, 2008, she and members of her entourage were kidnapped by Islamist insurgents in southern Somalia. She was released 15 months later on November 25, 2009, and has since embarked on a philanthropic career. In 2013, she released the book, A House in the Sky: A Memoir, in which she recounts her early life, travels as a young adult, and hostage experience. In 2014, the book was optioned to become a major motion picture by Megan Ellison, with Rooney Mara playing the role of Lindhout.

== Early life ==
Lindhout was born in 1981 in Red Deer, Alberta, Canada. After her parents separated, Lindhout lived in Sylvan Lake, Alberta. She and her two brothers (Mark and Nathaniel) were raised by their mother, Lorinda, with Amanda spending much of her youth reading National Geographic Magazine. Lindhout's father had chronic health problems, and depended on disability payments. Her mother held a minimum-wage job. Lindhout had early aspirations to become a model and did some brief modelling work. She also considered enrolling in a beautician's school.

== Journalism career ==
=== Press TV ===
At the age of 24, Lindhout quit her job as a cocktail waitress to become a journalist. She used her salary from the bar where she worked to finance reporting trips to various conflict zones around the world. Lindhout began her new journalism career in Afghanistan, arriving in the capital Kabul in May 2007. She later moved on to an assignment in Baghdad, Iraq in January 2008, where she worked on a freelance basis for Iran's state television Press TV. This led some Canadian reporters to criticize her, due to Press TV's reputation for producing state propaganda. According to her, she became uncomfortable working for Press TV, due to realizing she was "part of the propaganda machine". While in Iraq, reports indicated that Lindhout had been kidnapped in Sadr City. She was said to have been released several hours later, after paying a ransom to her abductors. However, Lindhout in her book denied having been kidnapped in Iraq. She wrote that she was instead taken to the Sadr Party Headquarters and questioned about her political affiliations, and that she was able to call an Iraqi friend who ensured they were released within the hour.

=== Abduction ===
At the time of Lindhout's abduction in Somalia, she was reportedly not affiliated with any news organization other than Alberta's Red Deer Advocate. She wrote a column for the small daily. Several media reports suggested that Lindhout was in Somalia on assignment for France 24. However, Nathalie Lenfant, a spokesman for the organization, indicated that Lindhout had sent only a few reports to the news agency from Iraq. Lenfant also stated that France 24 had declined two proposals by Lindhout to serve as a correspondent for the organization in Iraq and Somalia, respectively. According to Lenfant, the news agency later decided to confirm that Lindhout was on a freelance assignment for it because France 24 representatives "thought it would be better if she could be seen to be part of the structure of a larger company".

On August 23, 2008, two days after having arrived in Mogadishu, Amanda Lindhout and Nigel Brennan, a 37-year-old freelance Australian photojournalist from Brisbane, were kidnapped along with their Somali translator, Abdifatah Mohammed Elmi, their driver, Mahad Isse, and a driver from the Shamo Hotel, Marwali. They were on their way to conduct interviews at an internally displaced person (IDP) camp when they were stopped by gunmen. The abductors were teenage insurgents from the Hizbul Islam fundamentalist group. The two were kidnapped in lieu of two more experienced journalists (one of whom was National Geographic Magazine reporter Robert Draper), who had that morning beefed up their security before leaving to examine a refugee camp. Because of this move, Lindhout and Brennan were kidnapped instead. While in captivity, Lindhout was separated from Brennan and subsequently raped and tortured repeatedly.

On September 17, Al Jazeera featured footage of Lindhout and Brennan in captivity surrounded by gunmen. On October 13, 2008, the kidnappers demanded a ransom of US$2.5 million by October 28. On February 23, 2009, the Canadian Association of Journalists urged Prime Minister Stephen Harper to help secure the release of Lindhout and Khadija Abdul Qahaar, a Canadian woman who was kidnapped in November.

Elmi and the two drivers were released on January 15, 2009. The kidnappers later lowered the ransom demand to $1 million.

On June 10, 2009, CTV News received a phone call from a tearful Lindhout who seemed to be reading a statement: "My name is Amanda Lindhout and I am a Canadian citizen and I've been held hostage by gunmen in Somalia for nearly 10 months. I'm in a desperate situation. I'm being kept in a dark, windowless, room in chains without any clean drinking water and little or no food. I've been very sick for months without any medicine.... I love my country and want to live to see it again. Without food or medicine, I will die here."

On November 25, 2009, after 460 days as a hostage, Lindhout and Brennan were released following a ransom payment made by their families through a private firm that specializes in kidnappings and ransom payments. She was hospitalized in Nairobi for two weeks and treated for acute malnourishment. Following her release, Lindhout said she found the coverage of her hostage experience to be sensational. In September 2013, Tina Brown of the Daily Beast was accused of falsely printing stories about Lindhout during her captivity, including an incorrect story about an alleged Lindhout pregnancy that never took place. A resulting retraction was printed by National Public Radio in response to Brown's comments.

On June 12, 2015, the Royal Canadian Mounted Police announced the arrest of Ali Omar Ader, in Ottawa, describing him as the "main negotiator" in the hostage-taking of Lindhout and Nigel Brennan. On June 18, 2018, Ader was sentenced to 15 years in prison for the kidnapping.

== Memoir ==
In 2013, Lindhout released a memoir, co-written with journalist Sara Corbett, titled A House in the Sky recounting her experience as a hostage. She indicated in the book that her motive for travelling to Somalia in the midst of an insurgency was the dearth of competition from other journalists covering the region, as well as the possibility of documenting unique human interest stories. Once held hostage, she and Brennan were forcibly separated since they were not married, and she was subsequently repeatedly tortured and raped by her teenage captors. Lindhout asserted that she and Brennan had converted to Islam to both appease their abductors and make life easier for themselves. While it has been reported that Lindhout had given birth to a boy named Osama while in captivity, she dismissed such rumours as "gossip, one of dozens of unconfirmed stories that had floated out of Somalia since our capture ... Somalia seemed to be a factory for rumors, with a handful of news websites and uncredentialed bloggers pumping out what passed for information."

Chris Selley of The National Post wrote that the book was "bloody good journalism". Eliza Griswold of The New York Times said of the book that, "Her tale, exquisitely told with her co-author, Sara Corbett, a contributing writer for The New York Times Magazine, is much more than a gonzo adventure tale gone awry – it's a young woman's harrowing coming-of-age story and an extraordinary narrative of forgiveness and spiritual triumph." The USA Today wrote about her experience that, "The wide-eyed optimism and unflappable determination that led her to danger also kept her alive. In the months she lived in darkness and in chains, she held onto her sanity by escaping to memories of her world travels, picturing the vivid images in the old issues of National Geographic she found while dumpster-diving as a child."

The book became a New York Times bestseller, and was named one of The Globe Books 100: Best Canadian non-fiction by The Globe and Mail. It was also named the 2013 Best Book of the Year in the Biographies & Memoirs category by Amazon.com, in addition to the Best Books of the Year list published by Vogue Magazine. O Magazine listed the book as one of its recommendations on its Winter 2014 reading list. It was also the winner of the 2014 CBC Bookie Award for Best Canadian Nonfiction.

The book received criticism from some journalists. Some of Lindhout's retelling of events contradict those found in the earlier published memoir of her co-captive, Nigel Brennan. On June 25, 2014, the memoir was optioned by Annapurna Pictures in order to create a screen-adaptation of the book. The project's producers were set to be Annapurna founder Megan Ellison, and Rooney Mara, who was also set to play the role of Lindhout in the film.

== Humanitarian career ==
=== The Global Enrichment Foundation ===
In 2010, Lindhout founded the Global Enrichment Foundation to create more opportunities in Somalia by offering university scholarships to women. Lindhout currently serves as the organization's Executive Director, with Ahmed Hussen, the president of the Canadian Somali Congress, acting as the Fund's co-director. Aurala Warsame, a Somali researcher at the University of Alberta in Edmonton, supervises the program and vetted the first applicants.

In response to why she established the Foundation despite her kidnapping, Lindhout told the CBC's The National "You can very easily go into anger and bitterness and revenge thoughts and resentment and 'Why me?' ... Because I had something very, very large and very painful to forgive, and by choosing to do that, I was able to put into place my vision, which was making Somalia a better place ... I've never questioned whether or not it was the right thing to do ... What else to do after the experience that I had, than something like this?"

In conjunction with various private university institutions across Somalia, the GEF's Somali Women's Scholarship Program (SWSP) offers higher education opportunities to women in Somalia on a contribution basis. Lindhout's foundation aims to annually send 100 women in the country to university for the next four years, and is sponsoring tertiary education for 36 women, who are expected to go on to become teachers, doctors, environmentalists and engineers, among other professions. The GEF also started the SHE WILL micro-loan initiative to financially empower widows and other Somali women.

In response to the 2011 drought in East Africa, the GEF put into motion its Convoy for Hope program. The initiative received a US$1 million donation from the Chobani Yoghurt company. As part of the GEF, teachers with the Memorial Composite also raised funds to sponsor the Sankaroos women's basketball team of Abaarso School in Somalia, and a group of high school students in Alberta raised over $23,000 to support the GEF's educational work.

=== Return to Africa ===
Lindhout's work for the Global Enrichment Foundation eventually drew her back to Somalia in July 2011. Accompanied by CBC's The National, who filmed a documentary about her titled Return To Africa, Lindhout visited the Dadaab refugee complex in Kenya to research a $60-million educational project for children in the camp, many of whom fled the conflict in southern Somalia. Lindhout attempted to reconcile her fear of abduction with her deep commitment to helping the asylum seekers. However, her efforts were criticized by Badu Katelo, Kenya's commissioner for refugees, who suggested that the best solution to the issue was through military intervention in Somalia's conflict zones. Katelo characterized Lindhout's initiative as "small ... It's a drop in the ocean. It's not anything to rely on to bring peace to Somalia. I think if education was to bring peace in Somalia, then it should've happened a long time ago because in 1991, when refugees came here, they were all educated". Lindhout responded that "to anyone who's questioning us right now, that's fine ... That's fair. It is an incredibly challenging environment to work in, but time will tell the story."

Leading a large convoy carrying food aid for 14,000 people in the southern Somalia town of Dobley, she was welcomed by Somalia's Transitional Federal Government. Lindhout described the trip as also "an opportunity for me to look at that fear and maybe let it go – this fear that I have been carrying around with me for some time". Her Convoys For Hope project continued to provide relief and expects to assist 300,000 more people during the drought.

== Honours ==
Lindhout was awarded a Doctor of Laws, honouris causa, from the University of Lethbridge on May 30, 2014. The institution's Chancellor Shirley McClellan described Lindhout's story as "one of incredible perseverance and compassion," and expressed admiration for Lindhout for using her hostage experience as an impetus to effect change.

== See also ==
- Foreign hostages in Somalia
- List of kidnappings
- List of solved missing person cases (post-2000)
