= The Traitors (Australian TV series) season 1 =

Australian television series season

The Traitors
- Season 1
- Presented by: Rodger Corser
- No. of contestants: 24
- Winner: Alex Duggan
- Runner-up: Craig Carr
- Location: Robertson Hotel, Robertson, New South Wales
- No. of episodes: 12

Release
- Original network: Network 10
- Original release: 16 October – 13 November 2022

Season chronology
- Next → Season 2

The first season of the Australian television series The Traitors premiered on Network 10 on 16 October 2022. The season was won by Alex Duggan, as a traitor, with Craig Carr, placing as runner-up, as a faithful.

== Production ==
The first season of The Traitors featured members of the general public.

== Format ==
The contestants arrived at the castle and are referred to as the "Faithful". Among them are the "Traitors", a group of contestants secretly selected by the host, Rodger Corser. Each night, the Traitors would decide who to "murder" and that same contestant would leave the game. After the end of each day, where the contestants participated in various challenges to add money to the prize fund, they would participate in the Round Table, where they must decide who to banish from the game, trying to identify the Traitor.

If all the remaining players are Faithful, then the prize money is divided evenly among them. However, if any Traitors remain, they win the entire pot.

== Contestants ==
List of The Traitors contestants
Contestant	Age	Home State	Occupation	Affiliation	Finish
Millie Slennett	27	NSW	Veterinary Nurse & Dancer	Faithful	Murdered (Episode 1)
Jack Rodgers	25	QLD	Chess Champion	Faithful	Banished (Episode 1)
Sandra Wu	26	NSW	Personal Trainer	Faithful	Murdered (Episode 2)
Michael "MK" Kuzilny	59	VIC	Criminal Defense Lawyer	Faithful	Banished (Episode 2)
Ethan Fleming	27	VIC	Fitness Instructor	Faithful	Murdered (Episode 3)
Chloe Campbell	30	NSW	Clairvoyant	Faithful	Walked (Episode 3)
Kashindi Maree	20	QLD	Law Student	Faithful	Banished (Episode 3)
Midy Tiaga	29	VIC	Operations Manager	Faithful	Murdered (Episode 4)
Olivia Fisher	43	VIC	Forensic Investigator	Faithful	Banished (Episode 4)
Justine Reid	36	QLD	Social Worker	Faithful	Murdered (Episode 5)
Angus McNicol	38	QLD	Sales Manager	Traitor	Banished (Episode 5)
Claire Sawyer	52	NSW	Checkout Operator	Traitor	Banished (Episode 6)
Mark Norman	33	NSW	Legal Professional	Faithful	Murdered (Episode 7)
Matt Micallef	32	QLD	Real Estate Agent	Faithful	Banished (Episode 7)
Dirk Strachan-Thornton	34	VIC	Executive Concierge / Actor	Faithful	Banished (Episode 8)
Fiona "Fi" McKay	26	VIC	Dancer	Faithful	Murdered (Episode 9)
Marielle Intveld	24	SA	Law & International Politics Student	Traitor	Banished (Episode 9)
Nigel Brennan	50	TAS	Hostage Negotiator	Traitor	Banished (Episode 10)
Paul McNeill	61	QLD	Financial Investigator	Faithful	Murdered (Episode 11)
Teresa Newton	42	WA	Sports Club President	Faithful	Banished (Episode 11)
Lewis Wren	33	QLD	Electrician	Faithful	Banished (Episode 12)
Kate Williams	38	NSW	Photographer	Traitor (Note: Williams was recruited as a Traitor in Episode 10.)	Banished (Episode 12)
Craig Carr	57	QLD	Business Coach	Faithful	Runner-up (Episode 12)
Alex Duggan	26	SA	Model	Traitor (Note: Duggan was recruited as a Traitor in Episode 8.)	Winner (Episode 12)

=== Future Appearances ===
In 2026, Paul McNeill, featured on an episode of Millionaire Hot Seat.

== Elimination history ==
Key

The contestant was a Faithful.
The contestant was a Traitor.
The contestant was ineligible to vote.

Episode	1	2	3		4	5	6	7	8	9	10		11	12
Traitor's Decision	Millie	Sandra	Ethan		Midy	Justine	Lewis; Mark; Nigel	Mark	Alex	Fi	Craig; Kate; Paul	Kate	Paul	None
Traitor's Decision	Murder						Compete (Note: Following Angus' banishment, the remaining Traitors were told they would not be able to murder a Faithful that evening – instead, they had to pick three contestants who would participate in a roulette challenge, to gamble an amount of their silver bars the following day. They chose Lewis & Mark to accompany Nigel in the challenge, where they won an extra $40,000 for the prize fund.)	Murder	Offer (Note: Following this Banishment, the remaining Traitors were given the opportunity to invite one Faithful to become a Traitor. Should they accept, they would switch allegiances immediately and become a Traitor.)	Murder	Death Row (Note: Following Marielle's Banishment, the remaining Traitors were allowed to put three of the remaining contestants on "Death Row" – marking them as the only people who could be Murdered next. They chose Craig, Kate and Paul.)	Offer	Murder	None
Shield	None				Nigel	None		Kate	None		Lewis		None	
Banishment	Jack	MK	Tie (Note: The first round of voting resulted in a tie. Per the rules, a second vote was held where the players involved in the tie would not vote and the remaining players could only vote for those who tied.)	Kashindi	Olivia	Angus	Claire	Matt	Dirk	Marielle	Nigel		Teresa	Lewis
Vote	20–2–1	16–2–1– 1–1	4–4–3–3– 2–1–1	11–5	7–6–2–1	7–5–1–1	9–3–1	9–1–1	8–2	4–1–1– 1–1	5–1–1		4–1	3–1
Alex	Jack	MK	Midy	Kashindi	Olivia	Angus	Claire	Matt	Dirk	Marielle	Nigel		Teresa	Lewis
Craig	Jack	MK	Olivia	Kashindi	Olivia	Angus	Matt	Matt	Dirk	Marielle	Nigel		Teresa	Lewis
Kate	Jack	MK	Kashindi	Angus	Dirk	Teresa	Claire	Dirk	Dirk	Marielle	Nigel		Teresa	Lewis
Lewis	Jack	Claire	Kashindi	Kashindi	Olivia	Teresa	Claire	Matt	Dirk	Kate	Nigel		Teresa	Craig
Teresa	Jack	MK	Matt	Angus	Matt	Angus	Claire	Matt	Kate	Marielle	Paul		Lewis	Banished (Episode 11)
Paul	Jack	MK	Kashindi	Kashindi	Olivia	Claire	Claire	Matt	Dirk	Teresa	Nigel		Murdered (Episode 11)	
Nigel	Jack	MK	Olivia	Kashindi	Matt	Angus	Matt	Matt	Dirk	Lewis	Teresa		Banished (Episode 10)	
Marielle	Jack	MK	Angus	Angus	Dirk	Angus	Claire	Matt	Dirk	Paul	Banished (Episode 9)			
Fi	Jack	MK	Matt	Kashindi	Matt	Angus	Claire	Matt	Dirk	Murdered (Episode 9)				
Dirk	Jack	MK	Angus	Kashindi	Matt	Paul	Claire	Matt	Kate	Banished (Episode 8)				
Matt	Jack	MK	Marielle	Kashindi	Olivia	Teresa	Teresa	Teresa	Banished (Episode 7)					
Mark	Jack	Chloe	Angus	Angus	Angus	Angus	Claire	Murdered (Episode 7)						
Claire	MK	MK	Olivia	Kashindi	Olivia	Teresa	Matt	Banished (Episode 6)						
Angus	Jack	MK	Kashindi	No Vote	Olivia	Teresa	Banished (Episode 5)							
Justine	Jack	Chloe	Matt	Kashindi	Matt	Murdered (Episode 5)								
Olivia	Jack	MK	Teresa	Kashindi	Matt	Banished (Episode 4)								
Midy	Jack	MK	Angus	Angus	Murdered (Episode 4)									
Kashindi	Jack	MK	Midy	No Vote	Banished (Episode 3)									
Chloe	Jack	Teresa	Quit (Episode 3)											
Ethan	Jack	MK	Murdered (Episode 3)											
MK	Midy	Olivia	Banished (Episode 2)											
Sandra	Jack	Murdered (Episode 2)												
Jack	Midy	Banished (Episode 1)												
Millie	Murdered (Episode 1)													

=== End game ===
Episode	12		
Decision	Banish	Kate	Game Over; Traitor Win
Vote	3–0	2–1	Game Over; Traitor Win
Alex	Banish	Kate	Winner
Craig	Banish	Kate	Runner-up
Kate	Banish	Alex	Banished

== Mission ==
Episode	Mission description	Time limit	Money available	Money earned	Total pot	Shield winner
1	At night the players are split into two teams and taken to a graveyard where they have to dig up graves for buried silver. The two teams are working together with two different jobs. One team is searching for symbols that were carved into trees and the symbols connect to specific graves that would have silver. The other team is digging up the graves. Those searching for the symbols had to describe the symbol over a walkie-talkie to someone on the digging team.		$20,000	$12,000	$12,000	No Shield offered
2	The players are split into 4 teams to solve various puzzle-like challenges in 30 minutes. They have to board a train and each team has a carriage. The entire challenge is to stop the moving train. However each carriage has to wait until the previous one has found their clue. Team1: had the first carriage and had to find a specific person on the train manifest. Team2: had to find the ticket number for the person. Team3: had to do a math equation to come up with the numbers that team 4 would need. Team4: had to dig through suitcases using three numbers.	30 minutes	$24,000	$0	$12,000	No Shield offered
3	The players have to run across a field without being hit by the paintballs that are being shot at them. Players are running across two at a time.		$36,000	$22,000	$34,000	No Shield offered
4	Challenge one: The players have to cross a bridge above "Dead Man's Canyon". There are trap doors on the bridge so two of the players would help navigate the others to safely cross. Teresa and Olivia decide to navigate while everyone else is to cross. If the spot is safe, they would see a green light. If its not, the door would open and the player would fall through. This challenge had no time limit and finished after dark. Shield Challenge: The players must cross a near frozen lake to a platform where the shield is placed. Unlike other traitors, this shield would also protect the lone person from banishment and murder for the evening.		$28,000	$14,000	$48,000	Nigel
5	The players have to collect sculptures from around the property and balance them on scales. There are two spotters who would be on a balcony of the building to look at paintings which would help the others figure out what combination of sculptures would balance correctly. The spotters are Teresa and Dirk. The rest of the players are split into three groups and only one group can work at a time.		$30,000	$20,000	$68,000	No Shield offered
6	Nigel, Mark and Lewis bet money at roulette and after 3 rounds, earned $40,000 to the prize pot. The main challenge had the players to read a pattern of symbols which the others would have to put out so an airplane with silver bars would land. If the pattern is placed correctly, it would land and they would earn $10,000, however if the pattern isn't placed correctly, they lose out on the funds. There were two teams placing the symbols on the ground. Each round had a time limit of 10 minutes.	10 minutes	--- $30,000	$40,000 $30,000	$108,000 --- $138,000	No Shield offered
7	The players are broken into two groups: movers and shooters. They have 20 minutes to move balls onto a trolley that are then moved to a catapult. They then have to have the balls hit targets. Depending on aim depends on whether they hit the targets and earn the money. Shield Challenge: Players have to shoot using a bow gun at a player's target. If someone knocks the glass of the person's name, that person is out and can't receive the shield. The winner of the shield is the last player's name standing. Like the previous shield challenge, the winner is excempt from banishment and murder for the evening.	20 minutes	$20,000	$20,000	$158,000	Kate
8	The players have 20 minutes to grab keys to try opening cells that have locked cases inside. Each locked case has a random combination that those in the guard tower has the codes for. Kate and Teresa are in the guard tower.	20 minutes	$20,000	$12,000	$170,000	No Shield offered
9	The players have to match pairs of symbols in three groups: matches, movers, and muscle. The tiles are on a large wall so some have hold the ropes to help the one moving the tiles around.	15 minutes	$20,000	$14,000	$184,000	No Shield offered
10	The player have to get artwork through a laser grid through the room in 15 minutes. Of the players, Nigel manages to get the most artwork back. Shield Mission: The players head into the woods and are given metal detectors and a shovel. They would have to find puzzle pieces that would form a shield. Whoever solves it first, receives the shield.	15 minutes	$24,000	$16,000	$200,000	Lewis
11	The players are tasked with trying to open safes in pairs. The codes from the safes are connected to colored tubes which are shown on a high up tower. One of the pairs would have to run to get the information. The different pairs all have to wait for the previous pair to finish cracking the safe before going to the next.	15 minutes	$18,000	$10,000	$210,000	No Shield offered
12	The players are flown to Devil's Falls for their final challenge. They are told to absail in pairs to reach the silver bars. All players must reach them or they receive nothing.	20 minutes	$40,000	$40,000	$250,000	No Shield offered

== Ratings ==
No.	Title	Air date	Timeslot	Overnight ratings		Consolidated ratings		Total viewers	Ref(s)
No.	Title	Air date	Timeslot	Viewers	Rank	Viewers	Rank	Total viewers	Ref(s)
1	Episode 1	16 October 2022	Sunday 7:30 pm	257,000	10	209,000	11	466,000	
2	Episode 2	17 October 2022	Monday 7:30 pm	253,000	23	216,000	19	469,000	
3	Episode 3	18 October 2022	Tuesday 7:30 pm	265,000	18	207,000	18	472,000	
4	Episode 4	23 October 2022	Sunday 7:30 pm	221,000	16	177,000	14	398,000	
5	Episode 5	24 October 2022	Monday 7:30 pm	243,000	>20	194,000	21	437,000	
6	Episode 6	25 October 2022	Tuesday 7:30 pm	259,000	>20	212,000	19	471,000	
7	Episode 7	30 October 2022	Sunday 7:30 pm	225,000	16	44,000	14	399,000	
8	Episode 8	31 October 2022	Monday 7:30 pm	224,000	>20	47,000	21	423,000	
9	Episode 9	1 November 2022	Tuesday 7:30 pm	309,000	>20	43,000	18	515,000	
10	Episode 10	6 November 2022	Sunday 7:30 pm	206,000	13	32,000	14	368,000	
11	Episode 11	7 November 2022	Monday 7:30 pm	260,000	20	35,000	19	450,000	
12	Episode 12 End Game	13 November 2022	Sunday 7:30 pm	228,000 265,000	12 9	29,000 28,000	11 12	424,000 421,000	
