= GEF =

Gef may refer to a supposed talking mongoose from the Isle of Man

Gef or GEF may also refer to:

== Organization ==
- Global Enrichment Foundation, a Canadian humanitarian organization
- Global Environment Facility, an intergovernmental environmental organizations
- Global Equality Fund, of the United States Department of State
- Global Esports Federation, an international esports organization based in Singapore
- Green European Foundation, a European political foundation
- Greif, Inc., an American manufacturing company

== Science and technology ==
- Graphical Editing Framework, a software framework
- Guanine nucleotide exchange factor, a group of proteins

== Other use ==
- Greek Expeditionary Force (Korea), during the Korean War
