= Foreign hostages in Somalia =

The following is a list of known foreign hostages captured in Somalia, particularly since the start of the Ethiopian intervention and the 2009–present phase of the civil war.

== Australia ==
=== Released (1) ===
- Nigel Brennan, was a photojournalist who was kidnapped on August 23, 2008, alongside his colleagues, Canadian journalist Amanda Lindhout, and Somali photojournalist Abdifatah Mohamed Elmi, who were seized near Mogadishu along with two Somali drivers. Abdifatah and the two drivers were released on January 15, 2009. Lindhout and Brennan were released 15 months later on November 25, 2009 after a $600,000 ransom was paid. The abductors were teenage insurgents from the Hizbul Islam fundamentalist group.

== Canada ==
=== Released (1) ===
- Amanda Lindhout, was a journalist who was kidnapped on August 23, 2008, alongside her colleagues, Australian photojournalist Nigel Brennan, and Somali photojournalist Abdifatah Mohamed Elmi, who were seized near Mogadishu along with two Somali drivers. Abdifatah and the two drivers were released on January 15, 2009. Lindhout and Brennan were released 15 months later on November 25, 2009 after a $600,000 ransom was paid. The abductors were teenage insurgents from the Hizbul Islam fundamentalist group.

== Denmark ==
=== Rescued (1) ===
- Poul Hagen Thisted, was an aid worker who worked for the Danish Refugee Council's demining unit alongside American Jessica Buchanan. On October 25, 2011, they were abducted in the north-central Galkayo area. Gunmen from the al-Shabaab group were alleged to be responsible. The hostages were later rescued by US Navy SEALs on January 25, 2012, and taken to Camp Lemonnier at Djibouti's Djibouti-Ambouli International Airport.

== France ==
=== Escaped (1) ===
- Marc Aubriere, was a DGSE operative alongside Denis Allex, who worked for the government from the Sahafi hotel in Mogadishu. The men were subsequently taken by al-Shabaab and Hizbul Islam militants following a skirmish on July 14, 2009. Both men were then split between Al-Shabaab and Hizbul Islam. Aubriere escaped from his kidnappers while they slept on August 26, 2009.

=== Killed (2) ===
- Marie Dedieu, was kidnapped from Kenya's Manda Island on October 1, 2011 and taken to Somalia. Police suspect al-Shabaab gunmen were responsible. Dedieu, who was paraplegic, died later in the month.
- Denis Allex, was a DGSE operative alongside Marc Aubriere, who worked for the government from the Sahafi hotel in Mogadishu. The men were subsequently taken by al-Shabaab and Hizbul Islam militants following a skirmish on July 14, 2009. Aubriere escaped from his kidnappers while they slept on August 26, 2009. Allex was killed in an unsuccessful rescue attempt on January 11, 2013. In exchange for Allex's release, al-Shabaab had demanded cessation of French support for the Somali authorities and the complete withdrawal of AMISOM forces from Somalia. According to the French Ministry of Defence, 17 militants were also killed in the crossfire.

== Germany ==
=== Hostage (1) ===
- Sonja Nientiet, was a nurse for the International Committee of the Red Cross. Nientiet was kidnapped in Mogadishu on May 2, 2018 at around 8pm. In December 2024, it was reported that the German Federal Intelligence Service located Nientiet and planned a rescue operation. However, then-Foreign Minister Heiko Maas allegedly ceased the mission because he feared "the operation could end in a bloodbath and the death of the hostage. In March 2025, a video was released showing Nientiet pleading for her release.

== Kenya ==
=== Released (3) ===
- Fredrick Irungu Wainaina, Edward Mule Yesse, and Dekow Mohammed, were kidnapped on January 11, 2013. Retaliating against the coordinated Operation Linda Nchi inside Somalia, about 100 heavily armed al-Shabaab gunmen raided a police camp in Gerille, Wajir District, near the Somalia-Kenya border. The militants bombed the camp, killed six people and wounded three others, stealing firearms, ammunition and a vehicle in the process. Three individuals were taken hostage. According to local media reports, the insurgents later paraded the hostages in the southern Somali town of Bardhere (BardherBardere). On January 19, the militants released photos of two of their captives, who were identified as Kenyan government officials Fredrick Irungu Wainaina and Edward Mule Yesse. A third hostage, Dekow Mohammed, was of Somali descent. He was released on January 17, 2013. Two of the hostages reportedly included a chief and a district officer. Wainaina and Yesse were released on July 30, 2013.

=== Unknown (1) ===
- Patrick Amukhuma, was an environmentalist who, alongside his British colleague Murray Watson, was an employee of an Indian company under contract with the UN. On April 1, 2008, they were seized by unknown gunmen while conducting a survey in southern Somalia's conflict zones. Their driver, translator and two guards were not taken. Amukhuma and Watson have not been seen or heard from since. Their kidnappers' demands ranged from $2 million to $4 million in exchange for the men's release.

== Spain ==
=== Released (2) ===
- Montserrat Serra and Blanca Thiebaut, who were employed by Médecins Sans Frontières were kidnapped from the Dadaab refugee camp in Kenya on October 13, 2011, and taken to Somalia. Their Kenyan driver was wounded but not abducted. Police suspect al-Shabaab militants were responsible for the abductions. The two aid workers were released on July 19, 2013.

== United Kingdom ==
=== Released (3) ===
- Judith Tebbutt, was kidnapped on September 11, 2011 when gunmen stormed a bungalow on Kiwayu island, Kenya. Tebbutt's husband, British publishing executive David Tebbutt, was shot dead whilst Judith was taken to a hideout in Somalia. Police suspect that militants with the al-Shabaab group were responsible. On March 21, 2012, Judith Tebbutt's captors released her after her family reportedly paid a ransom.
- Paul and Rachel Chandler, were a British couple who were kidnapped on October 23, 2009, from their 38 ft sailing boat off the archipelago of the Seychelles during the night. The distress signal was sent out at 22:00. Naval forces and Search & Rescue centres were slow to react until the story broke on 27 October and pirates informed the media that the couple were in danger. The yacht S/Y Lynn Rival was found the next day by naval forces, abandoned off the Central Somali Coast. The two hostages had been first taken onto a previously hijacked merchant ship, the MV Kota Wajar. After ransoms were paid, the couple were released on 14 November 2010.

=== Unknown (1) ===
- Murray Watson, was an environmentalist who, alongside his Kenyan colleague Patrick Amukhuma, was an employee of an Indian company contracted by the UN. On April 1, 2008, they were seized by unknown gunmen while conducting a survey in southern Somalia's conflict zones. Their driver, translator and two guards were not taken. Watson and Amukhuma have not been seen or heard from since. Their kidnappers' demands ranged from $2 million to $4 million in exchange for the men's release.

== United States ==
=== Rescued (1) ===
- Jessica Buchanan, was an aid worker for the Danish Refugee Council's demining unit, alongside Dane Poul Hagen Thisted. On October 25, 2011, they were abducted in the north-central Galkayo area. Gunmen from the Al-Shabaab Islamist group were alleged to be responsible. The hostages were later rescued by US Navy SEALs on January 25, 2012, and taken to Camp Lemonnier at Djibouti's Djibouti-Ambouli International Airport.

== See also ==
- Captive, documentary series in which the Paul and Rachel Chandler hostage situation was featured.
- Foreign hostages in Iraq
- Foreign hostages in Nigeria
- Foreign hostages in Afghanistan
