= The Traitors (Australian TV series) =

Australian reality television series

- Logo used in Season 3
- Also known as: The Traitors Australia
- Genre: Reality; Game show
- Based on: De Verraders by: Marc Pos; Jasper Hoogendoorn
- Directed by: Gary Deans
- Creative director: Ben Skinner
- Presented by: Rodger Corser; Gretel Killeen
- Composers: Dinesh Wicks; Adam Gock; Anthony Ammar; Rory Chenoweth; Brontë Horder; David Bruggeman
- Country of origin: Australia
- Original language: English
- No. of seasons: 3
- No. of episodes: 33

Production
- Executive producers: AJ Johnson (2022–2023); Lisa Fardy (2022–2023); Sarah Hadfield (2026); Kelly Martin (2026); Andrew Szusterman (2026)
- Producers: Matt Lovkis (2022–2023); Paul Soares (2022–2023); Ciaran Flannery (2022–2023)
- Production locations: Robertson Hotel, Robertson, New South Wales (2022–2023); Castle Claremont, Timaru, Canterbury, New Zealand (2026–present)
- Cinematography: Bennie Cronje
- Camera setup: Multi-camera
- Running time: 50–80 minutes
- Production companies: Endemol Shine Australia (2022–2023); South Pacific Pictures (2026–present)

Original release
- Network: Network 10
- Release: 16 October 2022 – present

Related
- The Traitors NZ; International versions

The Traitors (also known as The Traitors Australia outside of Australia) is an Australian reality television series broadcast on Network 10, which premiered on 16 October 2022. It is based on the Dutch series De Verraders.

Following the premise of other versions of De Verraders, the show features a group of contestants participating in a social deduction game similar to Mafia or Werewolf, as they stay in a luxurious heritage manor. During their stay, a small group of contestants become the titular "Traitors," and must work together to eliminate the other contestants to win a grand prize, while the remaining contestants become "Faithful" and are tasked to discover and banish the Traitors by voting them out of the game to win a grand prize worth up to $250,000.

Announced in 2022, the Australian edition was one of the first to be announced and aired, following the original Dutch version in 2021, with Endemol Shine producing the series. Two seasons hosted by actor Rodger Corser aired in 2022 and 2023. The series was axed in 2024, though 10 teased that the series may return in the future. In September 2025, 10 announced a third season, to air in 2026, with comedian and former Big Brother Australia host Gretel Killeen replacing Corser as host. This season featured a full cast of reality television personalities.

== Format ==
A group of contestants arrive at a mysterious luxurious manor as "Faithful" contestants – hoping to share a prize fund worth up to A$250,000. Among the group are the "Traitors" – a small group of contestants selected by the host on the first day, whose goal is to eliminate the Faithfuls and claim the prize for themselves. Should the Faithful contestants eliminate all the Traitors, they will share the prize fund. If a Traitor makes it to the end, they steal the money.

Each night, the Traitors secretly meet in the "Traitors Tower" and decide upon one Faithful contestant to "murder" – and that person will leave the game immediately. The remaining Faithful contestants will not know who has been eliminated until the following day when they will not arrive for breakfast. The group then take part in a mission to win money for the prize fund (awarded in the form of silver bars). In some episodes, the group also participates in a Shield challenge to win individual player immunity from elimination. In season one, the shield awarded safety from both Murder and Banishment. In the second season, the shields only awarded immunity from murder. The second season introduced the Armoury, a hidden room in which, in some episodes, players from the winning team of the day's mission were rewarded with the chance for one player to be secretly awarded the shield of protection, which gives the player immunity from being murdered, but not the banishment vote. An attempted murder on the shield holder will result in no player being eliminated.

At the end of each day, the group will participate in the Banishment Ceremony – where the players gather at the Round Table to discuss who they wish to vote out before individually voting for a player to banish. Players cast their votes privately before revealing their vote in turn to everyone. The person obtaining the most votes is banished from the game and must reveal their affiliation. In a tied vote, a run-off vote occurs between those tied with the highest vote tallies.

Occasionally, twists will impact the course of the game – most notably with Traitors being given opportunities to recruit new Traitors among remaining Faithful players.

=== End Game ===
After the final Banishment Ceremony, the remaining players (typically three or four) participate in the End Game. The players can choose to "Banish" or "End Game". A Unanimous "End Game" vote would end the game, while a vote to "Banish" would trigger another Banishment Vote. This voting process, "Banish" or "End", continues until the players have voted to conclude the game or if two players remain. If the remaining players are all Faithful, they will share the prize.

In the event that the game ends with multiple Traitors, they play the 'Traitors' Dilemma' - similar to the Prisoner's dilemma. Each player is given the option to "Share" or "Steal". If all voted to "Share", then each of them would equally share the pot. If at least one player voted to "Share" while any other Traitor voted to "Steal", then each "Steal" voter would share the pot, while the "Share" voters get nothing. If all Traitors voted to "Steal", then no one would win any money.

== Production ==
The logo of the first and second seasons

The series and casting for the first season were first announced in February 2022, with the series set to be produced by Endemol Shine Australia. By May, Rodger Corser was announced as the host, with filming taking place in mid-2022 in the heritage Robertson Hotel in Robertson in the Southern Highlands, and the season premiered on 16 October 2022.

Although the series was not formally renewed when the first season aired, casting for a potential second season was opened in January 2023. On 28 April 2023, the show was officially announced for renewal for a second season, which was teased to feature Celebrity contestants among Civilian contestants. The second season premiered on 13 August 2023. The series was axed in 2024 due to low viewership despite the series' cult following and the continued international success of franchise (including in the broadcast of the Australian version overseas), though 10 teased that the series may return in the future.

In August 2025, rumours surfaced that 10 were considering reviving the series for 2025, based on the continued international success of the The Traitors franchise. The new season would feature a cast of Reality TV personalities (much like the American version), and is set to be filmed in New Zealand, with South Pacific Pictures, the production team behind The Traitors NZ, producing the new season . These rumours were later confirmed with 10 also announcing Gretel Killeen as host.. The location was also revealed as Castle Claremont, Timaru, Canterbury in New Zealand, with the site acting as a Production Hub for the Australian and New Zealand versions (much like the Ardross Castle in Scotland for the American & British versions), with the hopes that the site will also host other versions, particularly for other countries in the Asia–Pacific region.

The series was distributed internationally by All3Media International and Endemol Shine International.

== Episodes ==
=== Series overview ===
Series overview
Series	Contestants	Host	Episodes	Originally released		Winner(s)	Prize	Traitors
Series	Contestants	Host	Episodes	First released	Last released	Winner(s)	Prize	Traitors
1	24	Rodger Corser	12	16 October 2022	13 November 2022	Alex Duggan (Traitor)	$250,000 (out of $250,000)	Nigel Brennan; Marielle Intveld; Angus McNicol; Claire Sawyer; Alex Duggan (from ep. 8); Kate Williams (from ep. 10)
2	20	Rodger Corser	9	13 August 2023	10 September 2023	None (Note: After Finalist & Traitors Blake, Sam & Camille participated in the Traitor's Dilemma, and all elected to "Steal", the trio each walked away empty-handed. The prize fund earned was not awarded.)	~~$208,000~~; ~~(out of $250,000)~~	Sam McGlone; Ash Pollard; Blake Willoughby; Camille Chicheportiche (from ep. 7)
3	22	Gretel Killeen	12	4 August 2026	9 September 2026	Kirby Bentley (Traitor)	$200,600 (out of $250,000)	Kirby Bentley; Alex Nation; Alvin Quah; Rhys Nicholson (from ep. 8)

=== Season 1 (2022) ===
No.	Title	Air date	Timeslot	Overnight ratings		Consolidated ratings		Total viewers	Ref(s)
No.	Title	Air date	Timeslot	Viewers	Rank	Viewers	Rank	Total viewers	Ref(s)
1	Episode 1	16 October 2022	Sunday 7:30 pm	257,000	10	209,000	11	466,000	
2	Episode 2	17 October 2022	Monday 7:30 pm	253,000	23	216,000	19	469,000	
3	Episode 3	18 October 2022	Tuesday 7:30 pm	265,000	18	207,000	18	472,000	
4	Episode 4	23 October 2022	Sunday 7:30 pm	221,000	16	177,000	14	398,000	
5	Episode 5	24 October 2022	Monday 7:30 pm	243,000	>20	194,000	21	437,000	
6	Episode 6	25 October 2022	Tuesday 7:30 pm	259,000	>20	212,000	19	471,000	
7	Episode 7	30 October 2022	Sunday 7:30 pm	225,000	16	44,000	14	399,000	
8	Episode 8	31 October 2022	Monday 7:30 pm	224,000	>20	47,000	21	423,000	
9	Episode 9	1 November 2022	Tuesday 7:30 pm	309,000	>20	43,000	18	515,000	
10	Episode 10	6 November 2022	Sunday 7:30 pm	206,000	13	32,000	14	368,000	
11	Episode 11	7 November 2022	Monday 7:30 pm	260,000	20	35,000	19	450,000	
12	Episode 12 End Game	13 November 2022	Sunday 7:30 pm	228,000 265,000	12 9	29,000 28,000	11 12	424,000 421,000	

=== Season 2 (2023) ===
No.	Title	Air date	Timeslot	Overnight ratings		Consolidated ratings		Total viewers	Ref(s)
No.	Title	Air date	Timeslot	Viewers	Rank	Viewers	Rank	Total viewers	Ref(s)
1	Episode 1	13 August 2023	Sunday 7:30 pm	216,000	17	232,000	12	448,000	
2	Episode 2	14 August 2023	Monday 7:30 pm	250,000	21	209,000	20	459,000	
3	Episode 3	21 August 2023	Monday 7:30 pm	268,000	20	50,000	19	476,000	
4	Episode 4	22 August 2023	Tuesday 7:30 pm	218,000	23	45,000	19	422,000	
5	Episode 5	27 August 2023	Sunday 7:30 pm	207,000	16	58,000	13	420,000	
6	Episode 6	28 August 2023	Monday 7:30 pm	265,000	20	48,000	19	494,000	
7	Episode 7	3 September 2023	Sunday 7:30 pm	211,000	15	—N/a	—N/a	211,000	
8	Episode 8	4 September 2023	Monday 7:30 pm	275,000	19	—N/a	—N/a	275,000	
9	Episode 9 End Game	10 September 2023	Sunday 7:30 pm	265,000 322,000	13 11	—N/a	—N/a	265,000 322,000	

=== Season 3 (2026) ===
No.	Title	Air date	Timeslot	National reach viewers	National total viewers	Night rank	Ref(s)
1	Episode 1	4 August 2026	Tuesday 7:30 pm	1,374,000	636,000	9	
2	Episode 2	5 August 2026	Wednesday 7:30 pm	957,000	539,000	14	
3	Episode 3	11 August 2026	Tuesday 7:30 pm	1,049,000	561,000	12	
4	Episode 4	12 August 2026	Wednesday 7:30 pm	893,000	515,000	14	
5	Episode 5	18 August 2026	Tuesday 7:30 pm	1,042,000	561,000	12	
6	Episode 6	19 August 2026	Wednesday 7:30 pm	935,000	543,000	14	
7	Episode 7	25 August 2026	Tuesday 7:30 pm	1,020,000	574,000	12	
8	Episode 8	26 August 2026	Wednesday 7:30 pm	943,000	565,000	15	
9	Episode 9	1 September 2026	Tuesday 7:30 pm	1,097,000	630,000	11	
10	Episode 10	2 September 2026	Wednesday 7:30 pm	970,000	596,000	14	
11	Episode 11	8 September 2026	Tuesday 7:30 pm	1,101,000	665,000	12	
12	Grand Finale	9 September 2026	Wednesday 7:30 pm	1,069,000	668,000	13	

== International broadcast ==
- In the United States, the show is available to stream on Peacock, the broadcaster of the American version.
- In Canada, the show is available to stream on Crave.
- In the United Kingdom, the first season was broadcast in July 2023 by the BBC, the broadcaster of the British version, premiering on BBC Three and BBC iPlayer on 9 July 2023.
- In New Zealand, the series was available on ThreeNow, as a companion to the New Zealand version aired by Three.
- In the Netherlands, the series is available on Videoland.
- In Croatia, the series premiered in March 2025 on Voyo.
- In Ireland, the series was available on the RTÉ Player, as a companion to their version of the show.

== See also ==
Other versions

- The Traitors Canada
- The Traitors India
- The Traitors Ireland
- The Traitors NZ
- The Traitors UK
- The Traitors US

Similar shows

- Australian Survivor
- Big Brother Australia
- The Mole
