= Global Enrichment Foundation =

Canadian-based humanitarian organization

- Formation: 2010
- Type: Humanitarian
- Headquarters: Alberta, Canada

The Global Enrichment Foundation (GEF) is a humanitarian organization. Founded by Amanda Lindhout in May 2010, it is dedicated to empowering women in developing and conflict-ridden countries.

== Overview ==
In 2010, Lindhout founded the Global Enrichment Foundation to create more opportunities in Somalia by offering university scholarships to women. Lindhout currently serves as the organization's Executive Director, with Ahmed Hussen, the president of the Canadian Somali Congress, acting as the foundation's co-director. Aurala Warsame, a Somali researcher at the University of Alberta in Edmonton, supervises the program and vetted the first applicants.

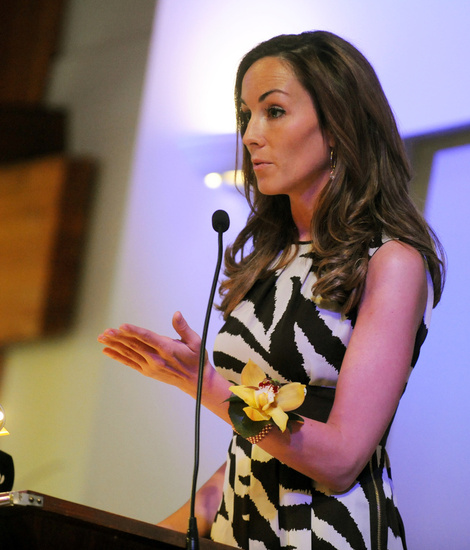
Amanda Lindhout, founder and Executive Director of GEF.

In response to why she established the Foundation Lindhout told the CBC's The National "You can very easily go into anger and bitterness and revenge thoughts and resentment and 'Why me?'[...] Because I had something very, very large and very painful to forgive, and by choosing to do that, I was able to put into place my vision, which was making Somalia a better place[...] I've never questioned whether or not it was the right thing to do[...] What else to do after the experience that I had, than something like this?"

In conjunction with various private university institutions across Somalia, the GEF's Somali Women's Scholarship Program (SWSP) offers higher education opportunities to women in Somalia on a contribution basis. Lindhout's foundation aims to annually send 100 women in the country to university for the next four years, and is sponsoring tertiary education for 36 women who are expected to go on to become teachers, doctors, environmentalists and engineers, among other professions. The GEF also started the SHE WILL micro-loan initiative to financially empower widows and other Somali women.

In response to the 2011 Eastern Africa drought, the GEF put into motion its Convoy for Hope program. The initiative received a US$1 million donation from the Chobani Yoghurt company. As part of the GEF, teachers with the Memorial Composite also raised funds to sponsor the Sankaroos women's basketball team of Abaarso School in Somalia, and a group of high school students in Alberta raised over $23,000 to support the GEF's educational work.
