= Kirby Bentley =

Australian rules footballer

Personal information
- Born: 9 May 1986 (age 40); Perth, Western Australia
- Original team: Swan Districts (WAWFL)
- Debut: Round 1, 2017, Fremantle vs. Western Bulldogs, at VU Whitten Oval
- Height: 172 cm (5 ft 8 in)
- Position: Utility

Playing career^{1}
Years	Club	Games (Goals)
2017–2018	Fremantle	7 (1)
2019	Carlton	3 (0)
Total		10 (1)

Representative team honours^{2}
Years	Team	Games (Goals)
2017	The Allies	1 (0)
- ^{1} Playing statistics correct to the end of the 2019 season.^{2} Representative statistics correct as of 2017.

Kirby Bentley (born 9 May 1986) is an Australian rules footballer and television personality who played for the Fremantle and Carlton Football Clubs in the AFL Women's competition (AFLW).

== Sports career ==
Bentley was signed as a priority player by Fremantle in August 2016 ahead of the league's inaugural 2017 season. She made her debut in Round 1, 2017, in the club's inaugural match against Western Bulldogs at VU Whitten Oval.

In 2017, Bentley played a State of Origin match for the Allies and injured her knee, which required surgery. She was delisted by Fremantle at the end of the 2018 season.

In October 2018, Bentley joined Carlton as a free agent.

The Kirby Bentley Cup, an Australian rules football trophy played for by Indigenous girls aged between thirteen and fifteen, is named for Bentley.

Kirby has also played netball for both West Coast Fever and Western Sting.

== Reality TV ==
=== Australian Survivor ===
Bentley competed as a contestant on the 9th season of Network 10's Australian franchise of Survivor, Australian Survivor: Titans V Rebels. she was praised by fans and critics for her strong social and strategic gameplay, and having great success in voting out other players through blindsides. However, she was eliminated before the finale, finishing in fifth place.

In September 2024, Bentley was announced to be competing on the forthcoming special global all-stars season of Australian Survivor, titled Survivor: Australia V The World. She was the sixth contestant voted out, finishing in ninth place.

=== The Traitors ===
In October 2025, Bentley was announced as a contestant for the third season of Network 10's The Traitors Australia. She ended up winning the season.
