= The Traitors (Australian TV series) season 2 =

Australian television series season

The Traitors
- Season 2
- Promotional poster
- Presented by: Rodger Corser
- No. of contestants: 20
- Winner: None
- Runners-up: Camille Chicheportich; Sam McGlone; Blake Willoughby
- Location: Robertson Hotel, Robertson, New South Wales
- No. of episodes: 9

Release
- Original network: Network 10
- Original release: 13 August – 10 September 2023

Season chronology
- ← Previous; Season 1 Next → Season 3

The second season of the Australian television series The Traitors premiered on Network 10 on 13 August 2023. In a franchise first, the season did not have a formal winner. Camille Chicheportich, Sam McGlone and Blake Willoughby made it to the final round as Traitors but lost the prize money following the Traitors' Dilemma.

== Production ==
The second season of The Traitors Australia featured celebrities competing alongside members of the general public.

== Format ==
The contestants arrived at the castle and are referred to as the "Faithful". Among them are the "Traitors", a group of contestants secretly selected by the host, Rodger Corser. Each night, the Traitors would decide who to "murder" and that same contestant would leave the game. After the end of each day, where the contestants participated in various challenges to add money to the prize fund, they would decide who to banish from the game, trying to identify the Traitor.

If all the remaining players are Faithful, then the prize money is divided evenly among them. However, if any Traitors remain, they win the entire pot.

== Contestants ==
Contestant	Age	Home State	Occupation / Original Series	Affiliation	Status
Anjelica Whitelaw	26	NSW	Lawyer	Faithful	Murdered (Episode 1)
Corinne Martell	61	QLD	Nurse	Faithful	Banished (Episode 1)
Elias Nohra	27	NSW	Insurance Disputes Manager	Faithful	Murdered (Episode 2)
Gyton Grantley	42	VIC	Actor	Faithful	Banished (Episode 2)
Paeden Bennetts	30	SA	Graphic Designer	Faithful	Murdered (Episode 3)
Ash Pollard	37	VIC	My Kitchen Rules 6	Traitor	Banished (Episode 3)
Paul de Gelder	46	LA	Shark Attack Survivor & Motivational Speaker	Faithful	Murdered (Episode 4)
Ian Zaro	27	QLD	Content Creator	Faithful	Banished (Episode 4)
Roha Taiapa	27	WA	Creative Director & Luxury Fashion Rep	Faithful	Murdered (Episode 5)
Annabel Fidler	30	VIC	Customer Success Manager	Faithful	Banished (Episode 5)
Luke Toki	36	WA	Australian Survivor 2017	Faithful	Murdered (Episode 6)
Simone Williams	32	QLD	Wrestler	Faithful	Banished (Episode 6)
Keith Banks	65	VIC	Police Officer	Faithful	Banished (Episode 7)
Hannah Ferrier	36	NSW	Below Deck Mediterranean	Faithful	Murdered (Episode 8)
Gloria Rono	25	VIC	Disability Support Worker	Faithful	Banished (Episode 8)
Liam Davern	23	TAS	Apprentice Electrician	Faithful	Banished (Episode 9)
Sarah Short	44	SA	Psychotherapist	Faithful	Banished (Episode 9)
Camille Chicheportiche	53	ACT	Former Federal Agent	Traitor (Note: Chicheportiche was recruited as a Traitor in Episode 7.)	Loss (Episode 9)
Sam McGlone	27	QLD	Marketing Consultant	Traitor	Loss (Episode 9)
Blake Willoughby	35	VIC	Beer Sales Manager	Traitor	Loss (Episode 9)

== Elimination history ==
Key

The contestant was a Faithful.
The contestant was a Traitor.

Episode	1	2	3	4	5	6	7	8	9
Traitor's Decision	Anjelica	Elias	Paeden	Paul	Roha	Luke	Camille	Hannah	None
Traitor's Decision	Murder			Murder (Note: Following this Banishment, the remaining Traitors were given the choice to either recruit or murder a Faithful. The Traitors chose to murder.)			Offer (Note: Following this Banishment, the remaining Traitors were given their final opportunity to invite one Faithful to become a Traitor. Should they accept, they would switch allegiances immediately and become a Traitor.)	Murder	None
Shield	Simone	Simone	Liam	Liam	Blake	Sam	Keith	None	
Banishment	Corinne	Gyton	Ash	Ian	Annabel	Simone	Keith	Gloria	Liam
Vote	9–8–1–1	15–1–1	8–2–2– 1–1–1	8–4–1	8–2–1	6–3	5–2–1	5–1	4–1
Blake	Corinne	Gyton	Ash	Liam	Annabel	Sam	Keith	Gloria	Liam
Camille	Corinne	Gyton	Ash	Sarah	Annabel	Sam	Keith	Gloria	Liam
Sam	Sarah	Gyton	Ash	Ian	Annabel	Simone	Keith	Gloria	Liam
Sarah	Corinne	Gyton	Camille	Ian	Annabel	Simone	Keith	Gloria	Liam
Liam	Corinne	Gyton	Ian	Ian	Annabel	Simone	Keith	Gloria	Sam
Gloria	Corinne	Gyton	Ash	Ian	Blake	Simone	Blake	Sam	Banished (Episode 8)
Hannah	Sarah	Gyton	Sarah	Liam	Annabel	Simone	Liam	Murdered (Episode 8)	
Keith	Sarah	Gyton	Ian	Ian	Annabel	Simone	Liam	Banished (Episode 7)	
Simone	Corinne	Gyton	Ash	Ian	Annabel	Sam	Banished (Episode 6)		
Luke	Sarah	Gyton	Ash	Ian	Sam	Murdered (Episode 6)			
Annabel	Corinne	Gyton	Ash	Ian	Sam	Banished (Episode 5)			
Roha	Sarah	Gyton	Sam	Liam	Murdered (Episode 5)				
Ian	Paeden	Luke	Ash	Liam	Banished (Episode 4)				
Paul	Sarah	Gyton	Keith	Murdered (Episode 4)					
Ash	Sarah	Gyton	Sam	Banished (Episode 3)					
Paeden	Corinne	Gyton	Murdered (Episode 3)						
Gyton	Corinne	Ash	Banished (Episode 2)						
Elias	Sarah	Murdered (Episode 2)							
Corinne	Annabel	Banished (Episode 1)							
Anjelica	Murdered (Episode 1)								

End game

Episode	9		
Decision	Sarah	Traitors' Dilemma (Note: Following Sarah's Banishment, the Final 3 traitors participated in the Traitor's Dilemma and were given a choice to either Share or Steal – The Share option would result in either – 1) if all Traitors choose the option, all remaining Traitors would get an equal split of the pot, or 2) If any other Traitor chooses the Steal option, anyone who chooses Share does not win any share of the pot, while the Steal option would result in either – 1) If one Traitor chooses the option, the Traitor would win the entire pot, or 2) If two Traitors choose the option, the Traitors would evenly split the pot, or 3) If all three Traitors choose the option, no Traitor would win any of the prize.)	Game Over; No Winner
Vote	3–1	3–0	Game Over; No Winner
Blake	Sarah	Steal	Loss
Camille	Sarah	Steal	Loss
Sam	Sarah	Steal	Loss
Sarah	Sam	Banished	

== Missions ==
Episode	Mission description	Money available	Money earned	Total pot	Shield winner
1	Players were split into two teams and tasked with pulling a wooden horse up a hill, lighting it on fire, and rolling it through a door at the bottom of the hill. Each team to finish would add $20,000 to the prize pot, and the first team to finish would win access to the Armoury.: Red Team: Annabel, Ash, Blake, Corinne, Gyton, Ian, Keith, Paul, Sam, Simone; Blue Team: Anjelica, Camille, Elias, Gloria, Hannah, Liam, Luke, Paeden, Roha, Sarah	$40,000	$40,000	$40,000	Simone
2	Players were split into two teams, designating two players each to paddle a boat onto a lake to retrieve puzzle pieces. Once all pieces were retrieved, the remaining players would assemble a puzzle on the shore. Each completed puzzle would award the players $16,000, and the first team to finish won access to the Armoury.: Red Team: Ash, Camille, Gyton, Hannah, Ian, Liam, Paul, Roha, Simone; Blue Team: Annabel, Blake, Gloria, Keith, Luke, Paeden, Sam, Sarah	$32,000	$16,000	$56,000	Simone
3	Split into two teams, the mission was played in rounds. Each round teams would designate a player to retrieve a riddle clue pertaining to an accessory worn by a person among the parish in a church; the first team to find the correct parishioner would receive $2,000 for the pot, and the team who won the most rounds won a trip to the Armoury.: Red Team: Blake, Camille, Gloria, Ian, Paul, Sam, Simone; Blue Team: Annabel, Ash, Hannah, Keith, Liam, Luke, Roha, Sarah	$16,000	$16,000	$72,000	Liam
4	Teams would send 2 players at a time into a minefield, with each mine having a true or false statement pertaining to the players. If the players chose a true statement, they would receive $2,000 for the pot; if they chose a false statement, they received nothing. The team with the most correct statements chosen were allowed to play in a mission for a shield. Shield Mission: The winning team was pitted against each other, using a flaming crossbow to shoot at model ships on a lake bearing their names; once a player's ship was hit by a bolt, they were eliminated. Last player standing won the shield.: Red Team: Annabel, Gloria, Liam, Luke, Sam, Simone, Sarah; Blue Team: Blake, Camille, Hannah, Ian, Keith, Roha	$16,000	$14,000	$86,000	Liam
5	Players were split into two groups, one answering collectively, and the others answering individually. Players were asked opinion questions about the remaining players in the game; if the collective group answered the same as the individual being asked the question, the players would add $2,000 to the pot and the individual would win access to the Armoury.: Armoury Access: Annabel, Blake, Gloria, Keith, Liam, Sam	$22,000	$12,000	$98,000	Blake
6	Players were given a weighted backpack with 20kg and tasked to climb up a 2km hill. Every trip, they would bring a silver bar up the hill, and each successful trip added $2,000 to the pot. Midway up, players were tempted to anonymously give up their bar of silver for either access to the Armoury, or a luxury item. Each offer taken would reduce the money banked by $2,000.: Armoury Access: Gloria, Keith, Liam, Sam, Simone	$48,000	$18,000	$116,000	Sam
7	Two players were chained up in a cabin and given a map of the surrounding area; the remaining players needed to find barrels at the listed locations on the map, smash them open, and find keys hidden inside them. Once eight keys were collected, the players in the cabin needed to remove their chains and escape the cabin. Succeeding in thirty minutes or less won $30,000. Shield Mission: Targets were set up with one player's face printed on each. One at a time, players took turns throwing axes at the targets; once a target had been hit twice, the designated player was eliminated from the mission. Last player standing won a shield.	$30,000	$30,000	$146,000	Keith
8	Players with split into teams of two and tasked with finding a specific antique while one was blindfolded. The only person who can touch the item is blindfolded and the players would lose money if other antiques were damaged in their pursuit while under the 30 minute time limit. Only one team could be inside at a time. Over the course of the challenge, everyone manages to knock other items over, causing them to lose $4,000.	$20,000	$16,000	$162,000	—N/a
9	Players must find silver bars that had been "stolen" by a neighbor. They have to reenact a heist under a time limit of 30 minutes. They are given a map of places to look which include the pond, a pump shed, a cattle yard, and a "manor". When inside the final room, an alarm goes off but everyone rushes off with them succeeding on finding all the silver bars, earning $46,000.	$46,000	$46,000	$208,000	—N/a

== Ratings ==
No.	Title	Air date	Timeslot	Overnight ratings		Consolidated ratings		Total viewers	Ref(s)
No.	Title	Air date	Timeslot	Viewers	Rank	Viewers	Rank	Total viewers	Ref(s)
1	Episode 1	13 August 2023	Sunday 7:30 pm	216,000	17	232,000	12	448,000	
2	Episode 2	14 August 2023	Monday 7:30 pm	250,000	21	209,000	20	459,000	
3	Episode 3	21 August 2023	Monday 7:30 pm	268,000	20	50,000	19	476,000	
4	Episode 4	22 August 2023	Tuesday 7:30 pm	218,000	23	45,000	19	422,000	
5	Episode 5	27 August 2023	Sunday 7:30 pm	207,000	16	58,000	13	420,000	
6	Episode 6	28 August 2023	Monday 7:30 pm	265,000	20	48,000	19	494,000	
7	Episode 7	3 September 2023	Sunday 7:30 pm	211,000	15	—N/a	—N/a	211,000	
8	Episode 8	4 September 2023	Monday 7:30 pm	275,000	19	—N/a	—N/a	275,000	
9	Episode 9 End Game	10 September 2023	Sunday 7:30 pm	265,000 322,000	13 11	—N/a	—N/a	265,000 322,000	
