= The Traitors (Australian TV series) season 3 =

Australian television series season

The Traitors
- Season 3
- Presented by: Gretel Killeen
- No. of contestants: 22
- Winner: Kirby Bentley
- Runner-up: Keira Maguire
- Location: Castle Claremont, Timaru, Canterbury
- No. of episodes: 12

Release
- Original network: Network 10
- Original release: 4 August – 9 September 2026

Season chronology
- ← Previous; Season 2

The third season of the Australian television series The Traitors premiered on Network 10 on 4 August 2026. The premiere episode of the season was released early on the network's streaming service on 2 August 2026.

== Production ==
In August 2025, rumours surfaced that Network 10 were considering reviving the series for 2026, based on the continued international success of the The Traitors franchise. The new season featured a cast of reality television personalities (much like the American series) and was filmed in New Zealand with South Pacific Pictures, the production team behind The Traitors NZ, producing the new season. The series was later confirmed by the network in September 2025, with Gretel Killeen announced as host.

The first trailer for the series aired on 1 June 2026, during series 18 of MasterChef Australia.

== Format ==
The contestants arrived at the manor and are referred to as the "Faithful". Among them are the "Traitors", a group of contestants secretly selected by the host, Gretel Killeen. Each night, the Traitors would decide who to "murder" and that same contestant would leave the game. After the end of each day, where the contestants participated in various challenges to add money to the prize fund, they would participate in the Round Table, where they must decide who to banish from the game, trying to identify the Traitor.

If all the remaining players are Faithful, then the prize money is divided evenly among them. However, if any Traitors remain, they win the entire pot.

== Contestants ==
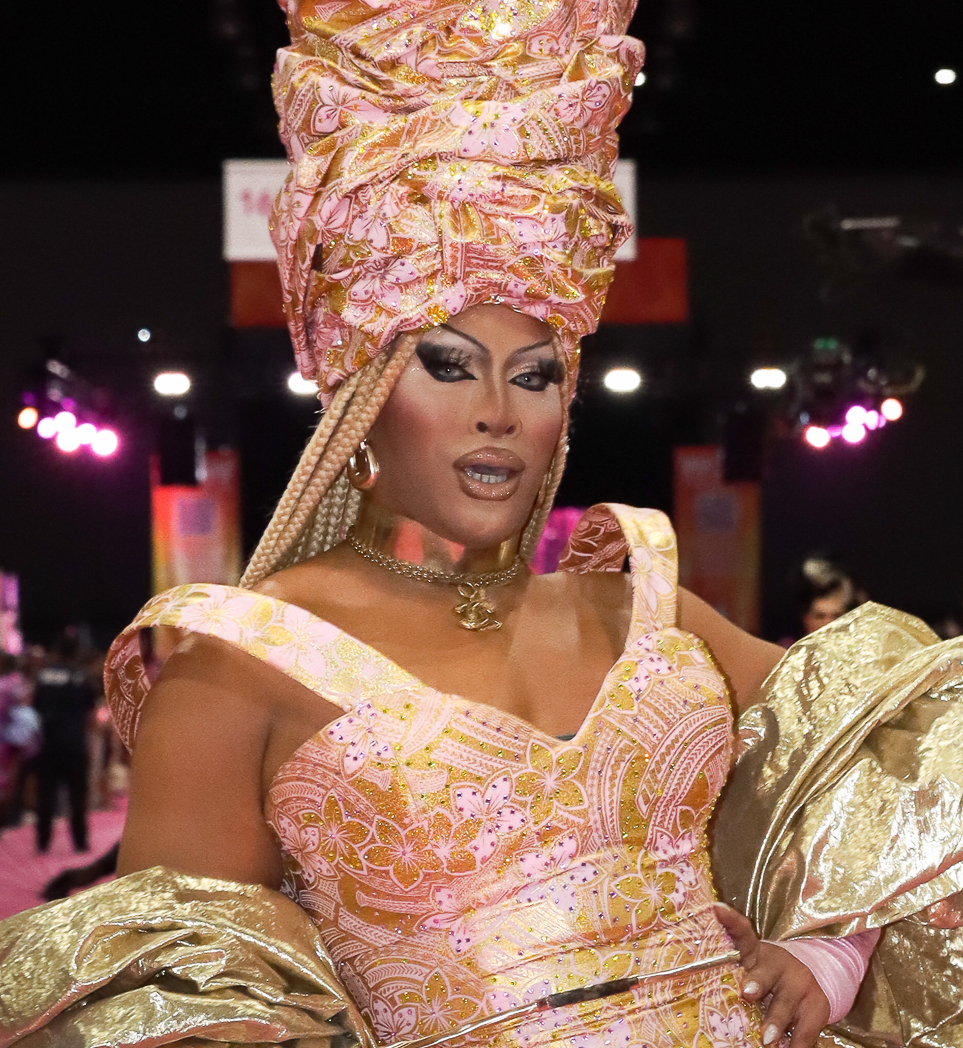
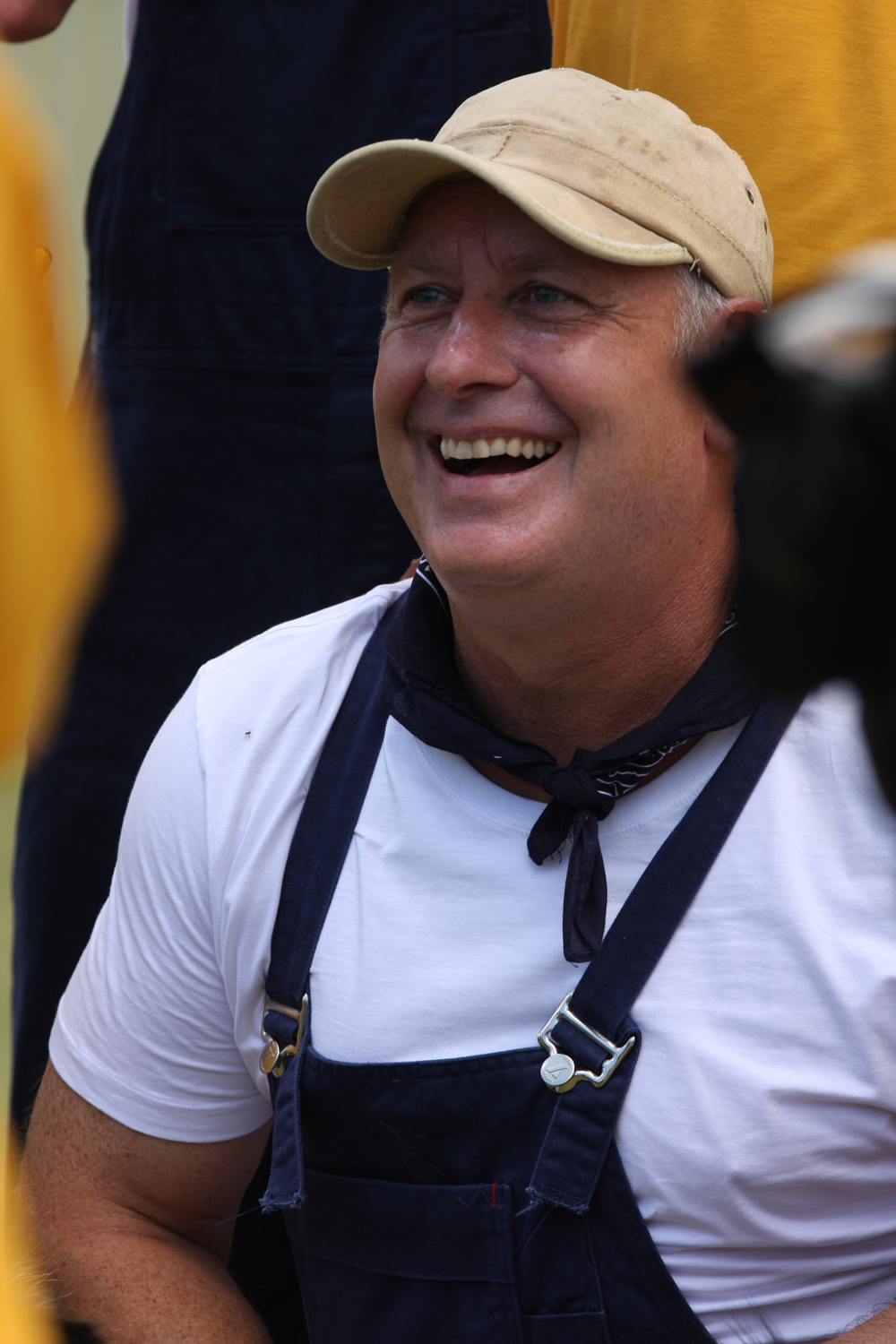
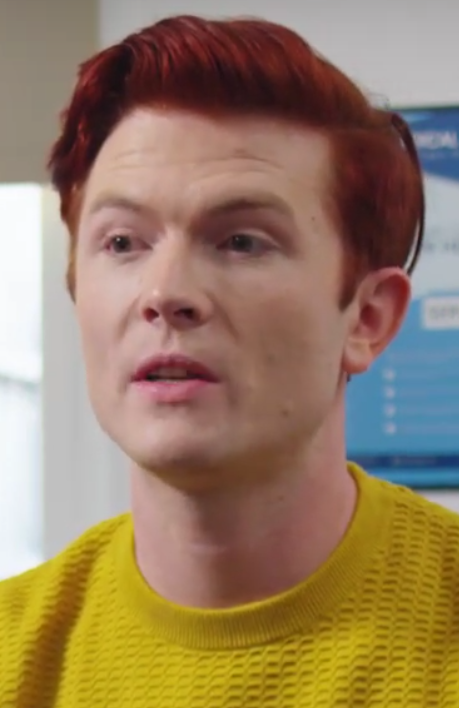
From left to right: Kween Kong, Shane Gould, Ian Dickson and Rhys Nicholson

The cast was announced in October 2025, shortly after filming was completed. Similar to the American edition and unlike the earlier seasons, this season's cast was composed entirely of reality show participants and public figures.

Notably, this is also the first season to feature a personal relationship, with twin brothers Josh and Luke Packham both featured in the show. The brothers both participated on Love Island Australia 2 and as a team on The Block: Fans V Faves 2.

List of The Traitors contestants
Contestant	Age	From	Notability / Original series	Affiliation	Finish
Cam Merchant	42	Sydney, New South Wales	Married at First Sight Australia 6	None (Note: Cam was eliminated before roles were assigned.)	Eliminated (Episode 1) (Note: Towards the end of Episode 3's Mission, the group that remained had to decide whether to allow Cam (whose identity was hidden by a cloak) back into the game, earning the group an additional $10,000. The group decided against it, sealing Cam's elimination.)
Kween Kong	33	Adelaide, South Australia	Drag Race Down Under 2	Faithful	Murdered (Episode 2)
Shane Gould	68	Bicheno, Tasmania	Australian Survivor: Champions V Contenders	Faithful	Banished (Episode 2)
Manaaki Hoepo	23	Melbourne, Victoria	Aussie Shore	Faithful	Murdered (Episode 3)
Cosima De Vito	48	Sydney, New South Wales	Australian Idol 1	Faithful	Banished (Episode 3)
Henry Nicholson	34	Adelaide, South Australia	Australian Survivor 2017	Faithful	Banished (Episode 4)
Gamble Breaux	53	Melbourne, Victoria	The Real Housewives of Melbourne	Faithful	Murdered (Episode 5)
Ian "Dicko" Dickson	62	Sunshine Coast, Queensland	Australian Idol judge	Faithful	Banished (Episode 5)
Rob Farnham	44	Sydney, New South Wales	Musician / son of John Farnham	Faithful	Murdered (Episode 6)
Alvin Quah	50	Sydney, New South Wales	MasterChef Australia 2	Traitor	Banished (Episode 6)
AJ Antonios	36	Sydney, New South Wales	Australian Survivor: Brains V Brawn II	Faithful	Murdered (Episode 7)
Alex Nation	34	Melbourne, Victoria	The Bachelor Australia 4	Traitor	Banished (Episode 7)
Claudia Bonifazio	26	Adelaide, South Australia	Love Island Australia 4	Faithful	Banished (Episode 8)
Luke Packham	30	Sydney, New South Wales	Love Island Australia 2	Faithful	Murdered (Episode 9)
Rachael Evren	25	Brisbane, Queensland	Love Island Australia 3	Faithful	Banished (Episode 9)
Lawson Mahoney	23	Sydney, New South Wales	Made in Bondi	Faithful	Banished (Episode 10)
Tully Smyth	37	Melbourne, Victoria	Big Brother Australia 2013	Faithful	Murdered (Episode 11)
Josh Packham	30	Sydney, New South Wales	Love Island Australia 2	Faithful	Banished (Episode 11)
Rhys Nicholson	35	Melbourne, Victoria	Comedian / Drag Race Down Under judge	Traitor (Note: Nicholson was recruited as a Traitor in Episode 8.)	Banished (Episode 12)
Krissy Marsh	53	Sydney, New South Wales	The Real Housewives of Sydney	Faithful	Banished (Episode 12)
Keira Maguire	39	Brisbane, Queensland	The Bachelor Australia 4	Faithful	Runner-up (Episode 12)
Kirby Bentley	40	Melbourne, Victoria	Australian Survivor: Titans V Rebels	Traitor	Winner (Episode 12)

== Elimination history ==
Key

The contestant was a Faithful.
The contestant was a Traitor.

Episode	1	2	3	4	5	6	7	8		9	10	11	12
Traitors' Decision	None	Kween	Manaaki	Claudia; Gamble; Rachael; ~~Rhys~~ (Note: Following the Death Row choice, the death row contestants participated in a challenge for a shield. Rhys won the subsequent challenge and was removed from Death Row.)	Gamble	Rob	AJ	Rhys	Josh; Luke	None (Note: Luke was revleaed to have been murdered from losing the Death Match.)	None (Note: There was no murder. This was awarded to the Faithful as part of the Episode 9 mission.)	Tully	None
Traitors' Decision	None	Murder		Death Row (Note: Following Cosima's Banishment, the Traitors were tasked to put four players without a shield on "Death Row" – marking them as the only people eligible for the next Murder. They chose Claudia, Gamble, Rachael and Rhys. Players on Death Row were isolated from the other players (including during the Challenge) until the Banishment Ceremony.)	Murder			Blackmail (Note: Following Alex’s banishment, Kirby was allowed to give a Faithful an ultimatum: become a Traitor or be Murdered. She chose Rhys, who accepted the offer.)	Death Match (Note: After the Round Table in Episode 8, the Traitors were tasked to shortlist two players for a Death Match by writing their names in slots four and thirteen on the billiards chalkboard before the end of the night. Luke lost the match and was killed.)	None	None	Murder	None
Shield	Josh; Rachael; Rob	None	AJ; Henry; Josh; Keira; Kirby; Lawson; Luke; Rob	Rhys	Keira	Claudia; ~~Krissy~~ (Note: Following the mission, each of the shield winners was offered $15,000 to the group if they handed back their shield. Krissy accepted the offer.); Tully	Claudia; Krissy	None		All (Note: note=No Murder)	Josh; Lawson	None	
Banishment	Cam	Shane	Cosima	Henry	Dicko	Alvin	Alex	Claudia		Rachael	Lawson	Josh	Rhys
Vote	Shane's; Choice (Note: Shane was selected by the group as the "most virtuous" contestant. When giving out keys to the Manor, she was left without a key and had to decide to give up her place in the game or steal another player’s key and banishing them. After making her decision, Cam was immediately forced to leave the manor.)	14–2–2–1–1	14–2–1–1	6–5–4–1–1	5–4–4–1–1	4–3–2–2–1–1	9–1–1	10–1 (Note: Luke was awarded the Dagger in Episode 8.)		4–3–1	5–2	3–2–1 (Note: Keira was awarded the Dagger in Episode 11.)	3–1
Kirby	No vote	Shane	Cosima	Henry	Dicko	Lawson	Alex	Claudia		Lawson	Lawson	Rhys	Rhys
Keira	No vote	Shane	Cosima	Rachael	Rachael	AJ	Alex	Claudia		Lawson	Lawson	Josh(2x) (Note: This player was awarded the Dagger, making their vote count twice at the round table.)	Rhys
Krissy	No vote	Shane	Cosima	Rachael	Dicko	Kirby	Alex	Claudia		Josh	Kirby	Josh	Rhys
Rhys	No vote	Rachael	Cosima	Dicko	Dicko	AJ	Alex	Claudia		Rachael	Lawson	Krissy	Krissy
Josh	No vote	Shane	Cosima	Henry	Rachael	Alvin	Alex	Claudia		Rachael	Lawson	Krissy	Banished (Episode 11)
Tully	No vote	Shane	Cosima	Rachael	Rachael	AJ	Claudia	Claudia		Rachael	Lawson	Murdered (Episode 11)	
Lawson	No vote	Luke	Kirby	Dicko	Rachael	Alvin	Alex	Claudia		Rachael	Kirby	Banished (Episode 10)	
Rachael	No vote	Keira	Cosima	Krissy	Rhys	Lawson	Alex	Claudia		Lawson	Banished (Episode 9)		
Luke	No vote	Shane	Cosima	Henry	Alvin	Alex	Alex	Claudia(2x)		Murdered (Episode 9)			
Claudia	No vote	Rachael	Cosima	Dicko	Rhys	Kirby	Alex	Rhys		Banished (Episode 8)			
Alex	No vote	Shane	Cosima	Dicko	Dicko	Alvin	Rhys	Banished (Episode 7)					
AJ	No vote	Shane	Cosima	Dicko	Rhys	Alvin	Murdered (Episode 7)						
Alvin	No vote	Shane	Cosima	Henry	Dicko	Rhys	Banished (Episode 6)						
Rob	No vote	Shane	Cosima	Henry	Luke	Murdered (Episode 6)							
Dicko	No vote	Shane	Henry	Henry	Rhys	Banished (Episode 5)							
Gamble	No vote	Shane	Cosima	Rachael	Murdered (Episode 5)								
Henry	No vote	Shane	Kirby	Kirby	Banished (Episode 4)								
Cosima	No vote	Shane	Claudia	Banished (Episode 3)									
Manaaki	No vote	Keira	Murdered (Episode 3)										
Shane	Cam	Rhys	Banished (Episode 2)										
Kween	No vote	Murdered (Episode 2)											
Cam	No vote	Eliminated (Episode 1)											

=== End game ===
Episode	12		
Decision	Banish	Krissy	Game Over; Traitor Win
Vote	2–1	2–1	Game Over; Traitor Win
Kirby	Banish	Krissy	Winner
Keira	Banish	Krissy	Runner-up
Krissy	End Game	Kirby	Banished

== Missions ==
Episode	Mission description	Money available	Money earned	Total pot	Shield winner(s)
1	Gretel's "lions" dug up one of her exes skeletons and hid them around the property. Players must go find its bones. If it is the wrong one players must go back and look for a different one. For each correct bone the players can win up to $15,000. They can also find shields on the way. They also must do this in a time limit.	$15,000	$15,000	$15,000	Josh
1	Gretel's "lions" dug up one of her exes skeletons and hid them around the property. Players must go find its bones. If it is the wrong one players must go back and look for a different one. For each correct bone the players can win up to $15,000. They can also find shields on the way. They also must do this in a time limit.	$15,000	$15,000	$15,000	Rachael
1	Gretel's "lions" dug up one of her exes skeletons and hid them around the property. Players must go find its bones. If it is the wrong one players must go back and look for a different one. For each correct bone the players can win up to $15,000. They can also find shields on the way. They also must do this in a time limit.	$15,000	$15,000	$15,000	Rob
2	Players must get into groups of three for today's game of true or false. Yesterday the traitors were asked to put answers to questions. They could either make an answer completely wrong to make the contestants heads spin or just answer truthfully. Player one must go up to the planks, players 2 and 3 get asked a question and have to guess what the traitors would say. If they get it correct the plank doesn’t move, if they are standing on the wrong plank Gretel will pull a lever and they will fall into a massive pool of slime.	$18,000	$7,500	$22,500	—N/a
3	Players must carry a palanquin along a path collecting money at various points. They must return it within the timeframe and leave players behind. The players who return earned shields.	$20,000 (Note: $10,000 was available from the mission and another $10,000 was available if the group allowed Cam to re-enter the game.)	$10,000	$32,500	AJ
3	Players must carry a palanquin along a path collecting money at various points. They must return it within the timeframe and leave players behind. The players who return earned shields.	$20,000	$10,000	$32,500	Henry
3	Players must carry a palanquin along a path collecting money at various points. They must return it within the timeframe and leave players behind. The players who return earned shields.	$20,000	$10,000	$32,500	Josh
3	Players must carry a palanquin along a path collecting money at various points. They must return it within the timeframe and leave players behind. The players who return earned shields.	$20,000	$10,000	$32,500	Keira
3	Players must carry a palanquin along a path collecting money at various points. They must return it within the timeframe and leave players behind. The players who return earned shields.	$20,000	$10,000	$32,500	Kirby
3	Players must carry a palanquin along a path collecting money at various points. They must return it within the timeframe and leave players behind. The players who return earned shields.	$20,000	$10,000	$32,500	Lawson
3	Players must carry a palanquin along a path collecting money at various points. They must return it within the timeframe and leave players behind. The players who return earned shields.	$20,000	$10,000	$32,500	Luke
3	Players must carry a palanquin along a path collecting money at various points. They must return it within the timeframe and leave players behind. The players who return earned shields.	$20,000	$10,000	$32,500	Rob
4	In the previous night the traitors assigned 4 contestants to be on death row who didn’t have shields. The competed in multiple races to win the shield and not be on death row. Whilst the rest of the contestants put bets on who they think would win. Rhys won the shield which meant gamble, Rachael and Claudia must die that night. But who dies is the traitors decision.	$21,000	$6,000	$38,500	Rhys
5	The previous night, the Traitors assigned seven players a "deadly sin". The players must try to predict who the Traitors picked for each "deadly sin". The group gets $3,000 for each correct answer. The previous night murdered player Gamble, gave three players a shield if they matched the selections. The group picked three players by telling them to stay in the church.	$21,000	$0	$38,500	Keira
6	Contestants climbed a steep hillside to retrieve three separate pieces of scattered effigies (legs, torso, head) and assemble them on posts at the top, carrying only one piece per trip. Each completed effigy earned $2,000, with a maximum of $26,000 for all 13. Shields were awarded to the players whose effigies were completed first, third, and twelfth. After awarding the three shields, Gretel offered each shield-holder an extra $15,000 added to the prize pot in exchange for returning their Shield.	$71,000	$41,000	$79,500	Claudia
6		$71,000	$41,000	$79,500	Tully
6		$71,000	$41,000	$79,500	~~Krissy~~ (Note: Krissy accepted the $15,000 offer for the shield.)
7		$18,000	$18,000	$97,500	Claudia
7		$18,000	$18,000	$97,500	Krissy
8		$20,000	$20,000	$117,500	—N/a
9		$18,000	$9,000	$126,500	—N/a
10		$41,100	$11,100	$137,600	Josh
10		$41,100	$11,100	$137,600	Lawson
11		$27,000	$27,000	$164,600	—N/a
12		$36,000	$36,000	$200,600	—N/a

== Ratings ==
No.	Title	Air date	Timeslot	National reach viewers	National total viewers	Night rank	Ref(s)
1	Episode 1	4 August 2026	Tuesday 7:30 pm	1,374,000	636,000	9	
2	Episode 2	5 August 2026	Wednesday 7:30 pm	957,000	539,000	14	
3	Episode 3	11 August 2026	Tuesday 7:30 pm	1,049,000	561,000	12	
4	Episode 4	12 August 2026	Wednesday 7:30 pm	893,000	515,000	14	
5	Episode 5	18 August 2026	Tuesday 7:30 pm	1,042,000	561,000	12	
6	Episode 6	19 August 2026	Wednesday 7:30 pm	935,000	543,000	14	
7	Episode 7	25 August 2026	Tuesday 7:30 pm	1,020,000	574,000	12	
8	Episode 8	26 August 2026	Wednesday 7:30 pm	943,000	565,000	15	
9	Episode 9	1 September 2026	Tuesday 7:30 pm	1,097,000	630,000	11	
10	Episode 10	2 September 2026	Wednesday 7:30 pm	970,000	596,000	14	
11	Episode 11	8 September 2026	Tuesday 7:30 pm	1,101,000	665,000	12	
12	Grand Finale	9 September 2026	Wednesday 7:30 pm	1,069,000	668,000	13	
