= Nigel Brennan =

Australian photojournalist and author (born 1972)

- Born: 18 May 1972 (age 54)
- Education: Griffith University
- Occupations: Photojournalist and author

Nigel Brennan (born 18 May 1972) is an Australian photojournalist and author. In 2008, Islamist insurgents in southern Somalia kidnapped him and Canadian freelance journalist Amanda Lindhout. He was released 15 months later after a ransom payment was given to his captors. He then went on to write a memoir recounting his hostage experience. In 2013, Brennan competed in the Clipper Round the World Yacht Race, and spoke after the end of the Atlantic leg about his abduction and its psychological aftermath.

In 2022, he was cast on the first season of the Australian reality show The Traitors, finishing 7th of 24 contestants.

== Abduction ==
On 23 August 2008, three days after having arrived in Mogadishu, Nigel Brennan and Amanda Lindhout went to interviews at an IDP camp. On the way they were stopped by gunmen and kidnapped along with their Somali translator, Abdifatah Mohammed Elmi, their driver, Mahad Isse, and a driver from the Shamo Hotel, Marwali. The abductors were teenage insurgents affiliated with the Hizbul Islam fundamentalist group.

The kidnappers initially demanded a ransom of three million US dollars. Brennan and Lindhout were held in isolation, mostly in a room 3 x 5 meters, and often in the dark. Both Brennan and Lindhout converted to Islam to ingratiate themselves with their captors. An escape attempt through a toilet window ended with their dramatic recapture in a mosque.

Elmi and the two drivers were released on 15 January 2009.

The Australian Government having a no-ransom policy led them to having very little involvement in Brennan's case. The kidnappers later lowered the ransom demand to $1 million.

After being held hostage for 462 days, the ransom was paid. Australian Greens parliamentary leader Senator Bob Brown and businessman Dick Smith lent money to secure their release. They were both released on 25 November 2009.

== Memoir ==
In 2011, Brennan released the memoir The Price of Life: A True Story of Kidnap & Ransom, which detailed his psychological journey, from the first weeks to the end - as well as the family's perspective. He co-authored it with his sister Nicky Bonney, and sister-in-law Kellie Brennan.

== Dramatization ==
British documentary/docudrama television series Banged Up Abroad featured the personal account of photojournalist Nigel Brennan in Series 7 (2012) Episode 18: Somalia/Nightmare in Somalia. Actor Tom Oakley played the role of Brennan.

== The Traitors ==
Brennan was a contestant on the Australian version of the gameshow The Traitors in the first season.

== See also ==
- Foreign hostages in Somalia
- List of kidnappings
- List of solved missing person cases (post-2000)
