= Hodan Nalayeh =

Somali-Canadian social activist and entrepreneur. (1976–2019)

Hodan Nalayeh هوذن نلايا
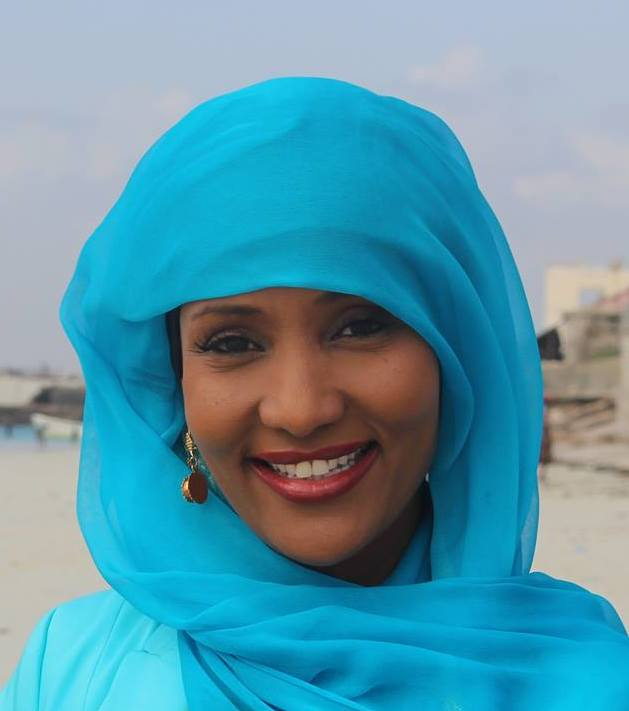
- Hodan Nalayeh in Somalia in 2015
- Born: 1976; Las Anod, Somali Democratic Republic (now Somalia)
- Died: July 12, 2019 (aged 42–43); Kismayo, Somalia
- Citizenship: Canadian
- Education: University of Windsor; Seneca College
- Occupations: Media executive, marketing consultant, activist, entrepreneur, journalist
- Title: President of the Cultural Integration Agency

Hodan Nalayeh (Somali: Hodan Naalleeye; Arabic: هوذن نلايا; 1976 – July 12, 2019) was a Somali-Canadian media executive, marketing consultant, social activist and entrepreneur. She was president of the Cultural Integration Agency and vice president of Sales & Programming Development of Cameraworks Productions International.

== Early life ==
Nalayeh was born in 1976 in Somalia She was raised in a large family, with four brothers and seven sisters. She hails from the Naleye Ahmed sub-clan of the Dhulbahante tribe. Her sister Dega Nalayeh is a senior vice president private client advisor with U.S. Trust.

Along with her parents and siblings, an eight-year-old Nalayeh later emigrated to Canada in 1984. They initially settled in Edmonton, Alberta, before eventually moving to Toronto in 1992.

Nalayeh attended the West Humber Collegiate Institute, a high school in Etobicoke. For her post-secondary education, she studied at the University of Windsor, where she received a Bachelor of Arts in communications. Additionally, she earned a postgraduate certificate in broadcast journalism from Seneca College.

== Career ==
Nalayeh was involved in client management, sales and production in radio and television for over 13 years. She served as a producer on a number of TV shows, including American Idol and So You Think You Can Dance. Additionally, Nalayeh provided marketing and writing consultancy to burgeoning companies. Her work in this area was centered on video marketing combined with online branding.

In September 2013, Nalayeh was appointed Vice President of Sales & Programming Development of Cameraworks Productions International's Canadian operation based in Vaughan, Ontario. The company is a global, full-service and comprehensively-equipped video and television production facility focusing on pre- to post-production of business-to-business video assets.

Nalayeh served as the President of the Cultural Integration Agency, a full-service media firm specializing in the development, production, marketing and distribution of multicultural programs. In February 2014, the company partnered with Cameraworks Productions International to produce a new television format for cultural community programming. To this end, on March 1 Nalayeh began hosting the half-hour Somali community show Integration: Building a New Cultural Identity, which airs Saturday nights on Citytv. She also served as an Executive Producer on the weekly Toronto program.

Besides media production and consultancy, Nalayeh was involved in voluntary and advocacy work for the Somali community. She founded the Somali Refugee Awareness Project, which in 2011 presented the veteran Somali artist Saado Ali Warsame with a Lifetime Achievement Award. In this capacity, Nalayeh also worked closely with a number of non-profit organizations.

== Death ==
Hodan Nalayeh and her husband Farid Juma Suleiman were killed during a terrorist attack at Hotel Asasey in Kismayo, Somalia, on July 12, 2019. The attack involved a car bombing and gunfire. The jihadist radical group al-Shabaab, based in Southern Somalia, claimed responsibility for the attack. Nalayeh and Suleiman married in November 2018 in Nairobi, Kenya, according to Nalayeh's sister. Nalayeh was the mother of two sons and was pregnant.

== Legacy ==
In March 2021, a secondary school in Vaughan was officially renamed to Hodan Nalayeh Secondary School.

== See also ==
- List of journalists killed during the Somali Civil War
