= Hassan Abdillahi =

Somali journalist and social activist

Hassan Abdillahi حسن عبد الله
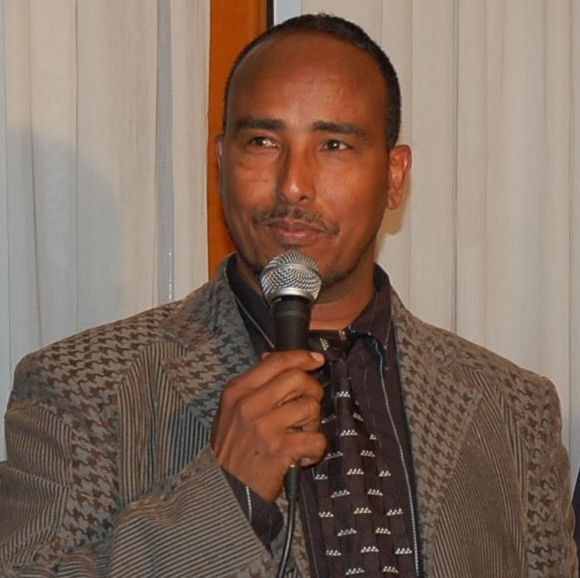
- Born: Somalia
- Occupation: journalist
- Title: President of Ogaal Radio

Hassan Abdillahi "Karate" (Somali: Xasan Cabdullaahi, Arabic: حسن عبد الله) is a Somali journalist and social activist who is the founder and President of Ogaal Radio.

== Biography ==
Abdi hails from the Ogaden Darod clan.

Nicknamed "Karate", he is the founder and President of the Toronto-based Ogaal Radio (88.9FM), the largest Somali community radio station in Canada.

Abdillahi has also played an active supporting role in the formation of the autonomous Jubaland state in southern Somalia, which was officialized in 2013.

== Awards ==
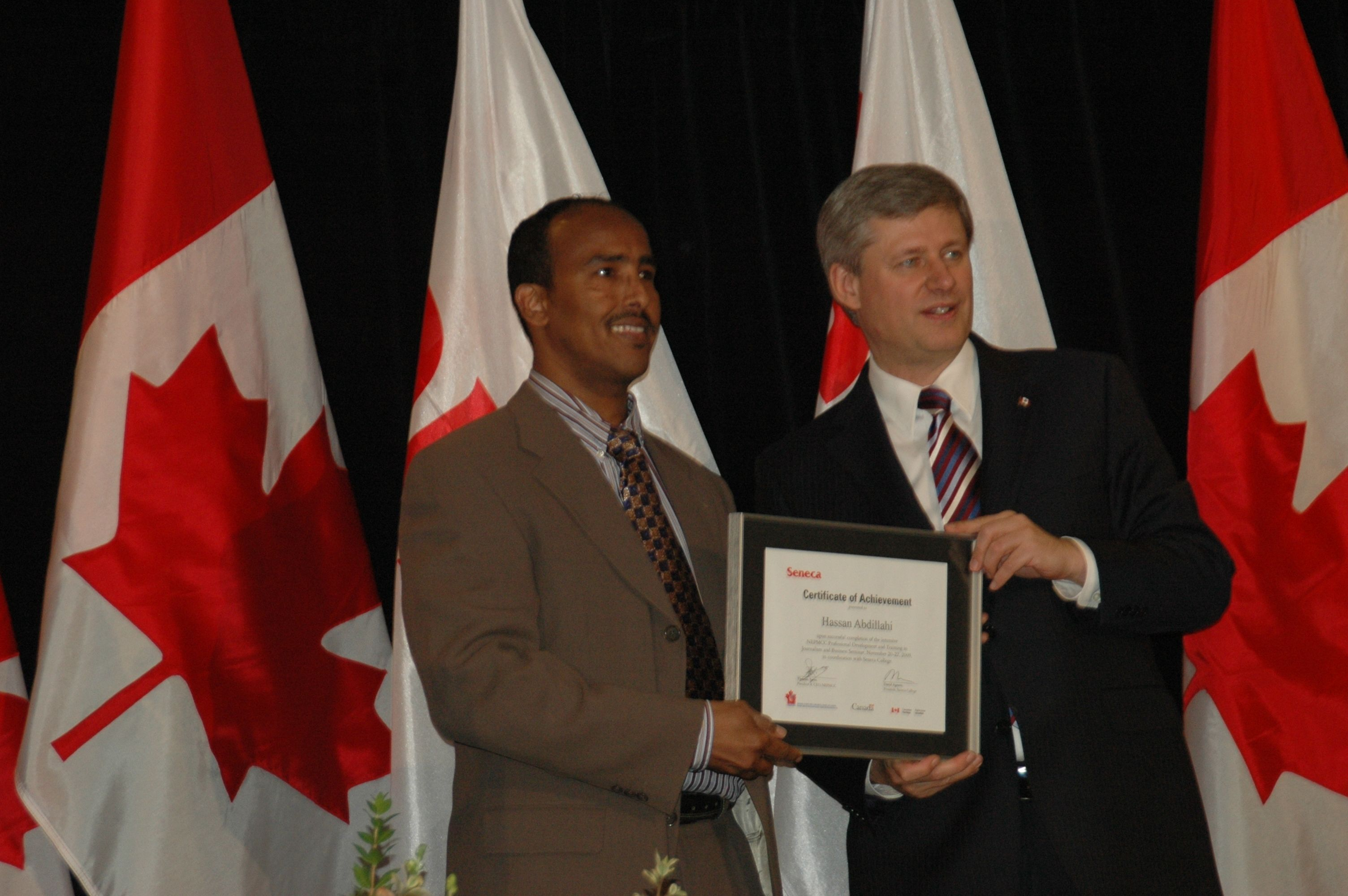
Hassan Abdillahi "Karate" being presented with a NEPMCC Media Award by Prime Minister Stephen Harper at Seneca College (2009).

In November 2009, Abdillahi was presented with a National Ethnic Press and Media Council of Canada (NEPMCC) award by Prime Minister Stephen Harper at an event in Seneca College.

== See also ==
- Hodan Nalayeh
