= Ahmed Hussen =

Canadian politician (born 1976)

The Honourable Ahmed Hussen PC MP
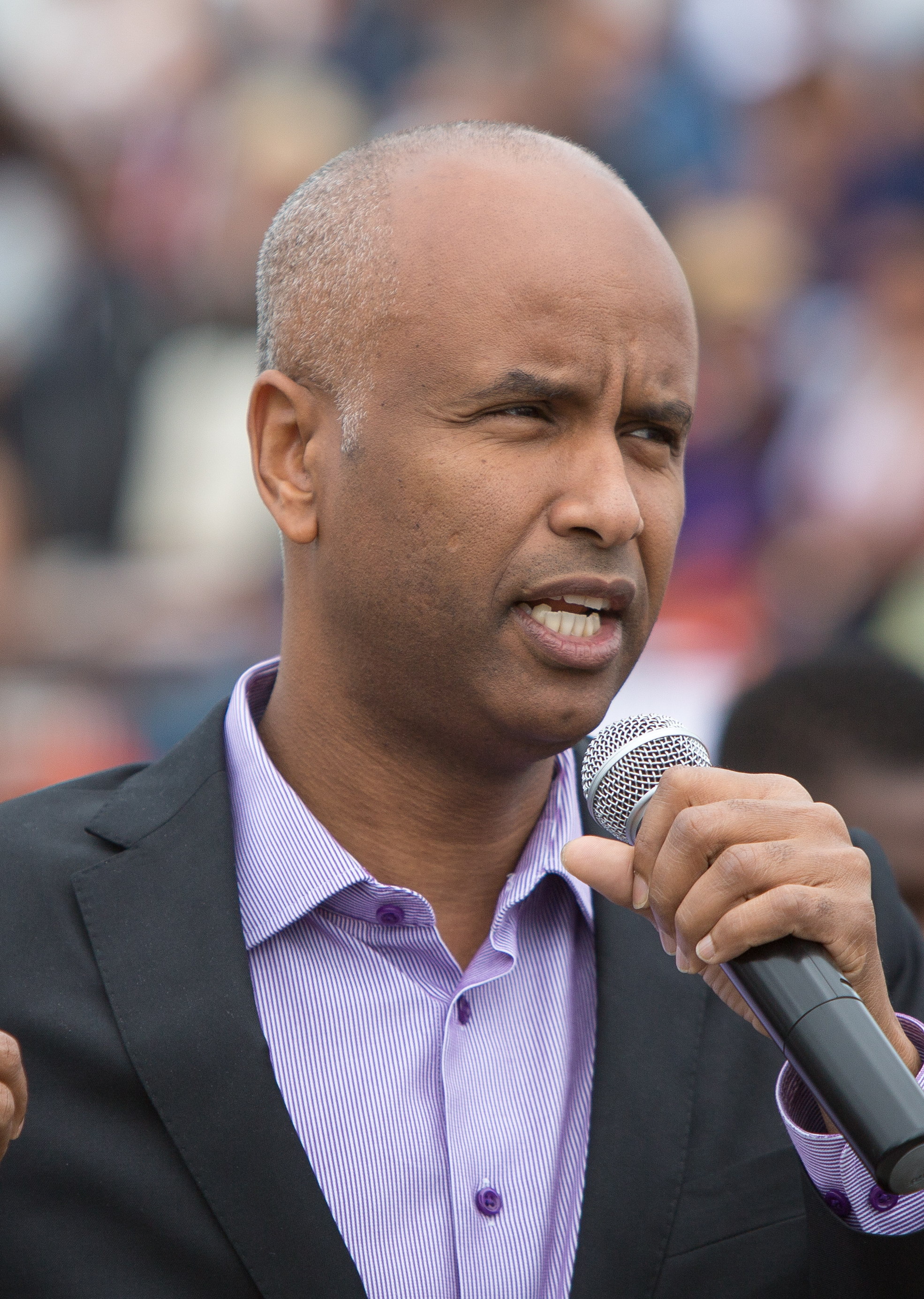
- Hussen in 2017

Minister of International Development
- In office July 26, 2023 – March 14, 2025
- Prime Minister: Justin Trudeau
- Preceded by: Harjit Sajjan
- Succeeded by: Mélanie Joly

Minister of Housing and Diversity and Inclusion
- In office October 26, 2021 – July 26, 2023
- Prime Minister: Justin Trudeau
- Preceded by: Bardish Chagger (Diversity and Inclusion)
- Succeeded by: Sean Fraser (Housing); Kamal Khera (Diversity and Inclusion)

Minister of Families, Children and Social Development
- In office November 20, 2019 – October 26, 2021
- Prime Minister: Justin Trudeau
- Preceded by: Jean-Yves Duclos
- Succeeded by: Karina Gould

Minister of Immigration, Refugees and Citizenship
- In office January 10, 2017 – November 20, 2019
- Prime Minister: Justin Trudeau
- Preceded by: John McCallum
- Succeeded by: Marco Mendicino

Member of Parliament for York South—Weston—Etobicoke York South—Weston (2015–2025)
- Incumbent
- Assumed office October 19, 2015
- Preceded by: Mike Sullivan

Personal details
- Born: 1976 (age 49–50) Mogadishu, Somalia
- Party: Liberal
- Spouse: Ebyan Farah
- Education: York University; University of Ottawa
- Profession: Lawyer, activist

Ahmed Hussen PC MP (Somali: Axmed Xuseen; born 1976) is a Canadian lawyer and politician who has been the member of Parliament (MP) for York South—Weston—Etobicoke since 2025. A member of the Liberal Party, Hussen was a Cabinet minister from 2017 to 2025, under Prime Minister Justin Trudeau. He was the minister of international development from 2023 to 2025, minister of housing, diversity and inclusion from 2021 to 2023, minister of families, children and social development from 2019 to 2021 and minister of immigration, refugees and citizenship from 2017 to 2019. He is the first Somali-Canadian to be elected to the House of Commons and the first to hold a federal Cabinet position.

== Early life and education ==
Hussen was born and raised in Mogadishu, Somalia. He has five older siblings and his father was a long-distance trucker. Hussen learned to speak English there from a cousin. He and his family left Mogadishu after the Somali Civil War reached their neighbourhood. He described his experience in the civil war: "I was 15 years old when Somalia was going through a civil war. There were chaos and violence everywhere. My parents and I decided that we had no choice but to flee. We gathered a few belongings, got on the back of a big truck with a few other families, left Somalia never to return". They lived for a period of time in Kenya, in a camp in Mombasa and several apartments in Nairobi.

Two years after leaving Mogadishu, Hussen moved to Canada as a refugee, when his parents bought him an airplane ticket to Toronto, where two of his brothers had already moved. He initially resided with a cousin in Hamilton, and moved to Toronto in 1994, where he settled in Regent Park in 1996.

Hussen completed secondary school in Hamilton. Due to a Canadian government policy that delayed granting permanent residency status to emigrants from Somalia, he had to decline three athletic running scholarships to universities in the United States. Hussen eventually attended York University, where he earned a BA in History in 2002. Having received a law degree from the University of Ottawa, and passed the bar exam in September 2012, he specialized in the practice of immigration and criminal law.

Hussen is married to Ebyan Farah, a fellow Somali-Canadian refugee. Together, they have three sons.

== Early career ==
Hussen began his career in public service and politics in the fall of 2001. He started out doing volunteer work in Legislative Assembly of Ontario. He was hired the following year as an assistant to Ontario Liberal leader Dalton McGuinty, then-leader of the province's Official Opposition. Hussen was promoted to special assistant, concurrent with McGuinty's 2003 election as the premier of Ontario. He held this new post for two years, during which he was in charge of issues management, policy and communications.

Hussen later worked with the Royal Canadian Mounted Police's Youth Engaged in National Security Issues committee.

He also founded the Regent Park Community Council. The representative body facilitated a $500 million revitalization and redevelopment project in Regent Park, the largest such initiative in the country. During the project's implementation, he was tasked with consulting with and protecting the interests of over 15,000 residents.

Hussen currently serves as the national president of the Canadian Somali Congress (CSC). Under his leadership, the CSC partnered with the Canadian International Peace Project and Canadian Jewish Congress to establish the Canadian Somali-Jewish Mentorship Project. It is the first national mentoring and development project between a sizable Muslim community and the Jewish community.

In May 2010, the Canadian Somali Congress and Canadian International Peace Project also partnered with the Global Enrichment Foundation to launch the Somali Women Scholarship Program. Hussen acts as the program's founding director.

Until 2012, Hussen served as a sitting member of the Harper government's Cross-Cultural Roundtable on Security. Established in 2005, the panel brought together prominent members from a number of Canada's cultural communities and government officials in order to discuss policy and program issues, and to promote dialogue and strengthen understanding between the national authorities and its electorate.

== Political career ==
=== Member of Parliament for York South—Weston ===
In December 2014, Hussen presented himself as a candidate for a Liberal Party of Canada seat in the riding of York South—Weston for the 42nd Canadian federal election. He won the nomination in a field of six aspirants. The victory makes Hussen the first Somali-Canadian elected to the House of Commons.

=== Minister of Immigration, Citizenship and Refugees ===
On January 10, 2017, Hussen was appointed minister of immigration as part of a Cabinet shuffle by Prime Minister Justin Trudeau. The nomination makes Hussen the first Somali-Canadian to serve in the government cabinet.

As immigration minister, Hussen announced on 2017 the Government of Canada will welcome nearly one million immigrants over the next three years. The number of migrants would climb to 310,000 in 2018, up from 300,000 in 2017. That number was to rise to 330,000 in 2019 then 340,000 in 2020.

On October 31, 2018, Hussen announced that the Government of Canada had updated its multi-year immigration levels plan, which would see the number of new immigrants in Canada rise to 350,000 by 2021. This plan was to see immigration levels rise by 40,000 more than Canada's target of 310,000 immigrants in 2018. The planned increases were set to reflect needs in the economic class of immigration to aid with Canada's labour shortages, as well as in humanitarian streams of immigration.

In a 2018, Angus Reid Institute poll found that Hussen is one of the least popular ministers in Trudeau's cabinet.

=== Minister of Families, Children and Social Development ===
Hussen was shuffled to the families, children and social development portfolio following the 2019 federal election.

=== Minister of Housing and Diversity and Inclusion ===
After the Liberals won the 2021 federal election, Prime Minister Justin Trudeau kept Hussen in his cabinet, moving him to the housing and diversity and inclusion file. Hussain owns a rental property in Ottawa, which has raised suggestions of conflict of interest.

In May 2022, Hussein accused critics of his record in tackling the housing crisis of "misinformation and disinformation".

In August 2022, it was discovered that Hussen's department had given a $133,000 grant to the Community Media Advocacy Centre (CMAC), an organization whose senior consultant has a history of anti-semitism. Fellow Liberal MP Anthony Housefather claims that he told Minister Hussen about the anti-semitic consultant before the news broke, and that Hussen and his department could have moved quicker to cut CMAC's funding.

In 2023, it was revealed that Hussein's office gave at least $93,050 to the sister of one of his senior ministerial staffers.

=== Minister of International Development ===
In July 2023, Hussen became Minister of International Development, succeeding Harjit Sajjan.

On 13 September 2023, Hussen joined the Advisory Board of the Global Center on Adaptation.

In January 2025, Hussen went on a Middle Eastern tour to discuss regional issues after the fall of the Assad regime the previous December. The trip included the first Canadian delegatory visit to the Syria–Turkey border area, where $17.25 million of humanitarian aid to help Syria was announced. Hussen also held meetings on Syria and the Middle East in Qatar with the minister of state for international cooperation, in Turkey with the deputy foreign minister, as well as a meeting in Saudi Arabia with the minister of state for foreign affairs and the secretary general of the Gulf Cooperation Council.

=== Backbench MP ===
He was re-elected in York South—Weston—Etobicoke in the 2025 Canadian federal election.

He was elected chair of the Canadian House of Commons Standing Committee on Foreign Affairs and International Development in the 45th Canadian Parliament in 2025.

== Awards ==
Hussen has over the years received honours and recognition for his public work. In January 2004, the Toronto Star named him among the 10 individuals who have made significant contributions to Toronto in various fields, including community service, business, sports and science. In 2017, Hussen was presented with the Top 25 Canadian Immigrant Awards, an award that honours the achievements of immigrants who have chosen to make Canada their home.

Hussen was also presented a Queen's Gold and Diamond Jubilee medal. He also received the Ontario Non-Profit Housing Authority Award for his efficacious advocacy work in Regent Park.

== Electoral record ==
2025 Canadian federal election: York South—Weston—Etobicoke
** Preliminary results — Not yet official **
Party	Candidate	Votes	%	±%	Expenditures
Liberal	Ahmed Hussen	24,540	55.24	–0.34	
Conservative	Nicolas Pham	17,562	39.53	+17.05	
New Democratic	Louise James	2,325	5.23	–9.36	
Total valid votes/expense limit					
Total rejected ballots					
Turnout		44,427	57.53		
Eligible voters		77,219			
Liberal notional hold		Swing		–8.70	
Source: Elections Canada

2021 Canadian federal election: York South—Weston
Party	Candidate	Votes	%	±%	Expenditures
Liberal	Ahmed Hussen	21,644	56.1	-2.3	$74,095.01
Conservative	Sajanth Mohan	7,783	20.2	+1.3	$20,850.17
New Democratic	Hawa Mire	6,517	16.9	-0.5	$57,283.18
People's	Sitara Chiu	1,754	4.5	+3.0	none listed
Green	Nicki Ward	872	2.3	-1.4	$1,360.28
Total valid votes/expense limit		38,570	99.0	–	$109,157.97
Total rejected ballots		404	1.0		
Turnout		38,974	51.1		
Eligible voters		76,304			
Liberal hold		Swing		-1.8	
Source: Elections Canada

2019 Canadian federal election: York South—Weston
Party	Candidate	Votes	%	±%	Expenditures
Liberal	Ahmed Hussen	25,976	58.42	+12.45	$96,745.62
Conservative	Jasveen Rattan	8,415	18.93	-0.29	none listed
New Democratic	Yafet Tewelde	7,754	17.44	-12.95	$55,295.42
Green	Nicki Ward	1,633	3.67	+1.63	$1,307.06
People's	Gerard Racine	685	1.54	-	$2,285.36
Total valid votes/expense limit		44,463	98.72		
Total rejected ballots		575	1.28	+0.46	
Turnout		45,038	56.75	-4.37	
Eligible voters		79,364			
Liberal hold		Swing		+6.37	
Source: Elections Canada

2015 Canadian federal election: York South—Weston
Party	Candidate	Votes	%	±%	Expenditures
Liberal	Ahmed Hussen	20,093	46.0	+13.2	$82,886.06
New Democratic	Mike Sullivan	13,281	30.4	−9.7	$155,467.41
Conservative	James Robinson	8,399	19.2	−5.1	$16,183.98
Libertarian	Stephen Lepone	1,041	2.4	–	$202.00
Green	John Johnson	892	2.0	−0.8	$455.00
Total valid votes/Expense limit		43,706	100.0		$203,875.44
Total rejected ballots		362	0.82	+0.02	
Turnout		44,068	62.63	+9.53	
Eligible voters		70,361			
Liberal gain from New Democratic		Swing		+11.45	
Source: Elections Canada

29th Canadian Ministry (2015–2025) – Cabinet of Justin Trudeau
Cabinet posts (2)
Predecessor	Office	Successor
Jean-Yves Duclos	Minister of Families, Children and Social Development; November 20, 2019 – October 26, 2021	Karina Gould
John McCallum	Minister of Immigration, Refugees and Citizenship; January 10, 2017 – November 20, 2019	Marco Mendicino
