= MV Kota Wajar =

Container ship built in 1997

History
- Name: MV Kota Wajar
- Operator: Pacific International Lines
- Port of registry: Singapore
- Launched: 22 July 1997
- Completed: 1997
- Identification: Call sign: S6BT; IMO number: 9157399; MMSI number: 564379000
- Status: in active service

General characteristics
- Type: Container ship
- Tonnage: 16,772 GT; 24,637 DWT
- Length: 184.5 metres (605 ft)
- Beam: 27.5 metres (90 ft)
- Speed: 16.8 kn (31.1 km/h) maximum; 10.4 kn (19.3 km/h) average
- Capacity: 1500 TEU
- Crew: 21

MV Kota Wajar is a 1997-built container ship operated by Pacific International Lines. On 15 October 2009, she was captured by Somali pirates en route to Mombasa. After received a $4 million ransom, the pirates released the ship on 28 December 2009, she was then assisted with medical supplies and logistics by the Canadian frigate HMCS Fredericton (FFH 337).
