= Somali Youth Coalition =

Youth organization based in Canada

The Somali Youth Coalition (SYC) is a community reach organization based in Toronto, Ontario, Canada. It was formed in 2001 when representatives from several child-youth service organizations united to identify and address the needs of and challenges facing the city's Somali youth.

== Projects ==
In 2003, the Trillium Foundation of Ontario approved an SYC grant to establish the Somali Youth Support Project. The project's goals include keeping youth in school, involving them in community, social, recreational, sporting and educational activities, encouraging volunteerism, and promoting youth leadership within the Somali community.

That same year, the SYC initiated two youth support programs: the Gang Prevention program and the Youth Support Services project. The Gang Prevention project is aimed at young Somalis in the Rexdale area of Toronto with the goal of working in conjunction with the Somali community, Somali parents, and Canadian public systems such as Education, Parks & Recreation, Child Welfare, and Criminal Justice to provide educational and preventative services to the local Somali youth and their parents. The Somali Youth Support program, for its part, works with the Somali community as well as mainstream institutions to reduce the risk factors that might cause Somali youth to drop out of school, join gangs and run into trouble with the law. The Project's strategy is to adopt an early prevention approach by promoting staying in school, getting involved in community recreation and sporting events, and developing young leaders who can serve as role models for other Somali youth.

== Somali Youth Recognition Awards ==
Under the umbrella of the Somali Youth Coalition, the Somali Youth Association of Toronto (SOYAT), Midaynta (a settlement and family services organization) and the Children's Aid Society of Toronto established in 2004 the Somali Youth Recognition Awards (SYRA), a ceremony that recognizes the significant achievements of and contributions to the Somali community by individual Somali youngsters. The SYRA also gives the Somali community a chance to show ownership and pride in its young people.

In order to win the award, nominees must meet a series of demanding general and award-specific criteria such as maintaining a minimum grade point average, managing or owning a business, setting a good example for other Somali youth, getting involved with the community and volunteering on a regular basis, among other things. Nine young men and nine young women are then selected to be recognized for outstanding achievement in a specific category.

=== Basic eligibility requirements ===
A candidate:

- must be of Somali descent
- must be a resident of the Greater Toronto Area (GTA)
- must be between the ages of 14 and 29
- Previous winners cannot win for the same category

=== Award categories ===
- Academic Achievement Award
- Entrepreneurship Achievements Award
- Successful Career Achievement Award
- Sports/ Athletics Achievement Award
- Community Work Achievement Award
- Music / Arts Achievement Award
- Spiritual Achievement Award
- Leadership Award

== See also ==
- Yasmin Warsame
