= Canadian Somali Congress =

Somali community organization in Canada

- Abbreviation: CSC
- Type: community organization
- Purpose: social, educational and peer work
- Headquarters: Toronto, Ontario
- Region served: Canada
- Official language: Somali, English, French
- Website: www.canadiansomalicongress.com

The Canadian Somali Congress (CSC) is a Somali community organization based in Toronto, Ontario.

== Overview ==
Lawyer Ahmed Hussen serves as the CSC's national President.

The body works closely with national and regional authorities to strengthen civic relations. Among other initiatives, the Canadian Somali Congress has formed a partnership with the Canadian International Peace Project and Canadian Jewish Congress to establish the Canadian Somali-Jewish Mentorship Project, the first national mentoring and development project between a sizable Muslim community and the Jewish community.

== See also ==
- Somali Youth Coalition
