= Upolu =

Island in Samoa

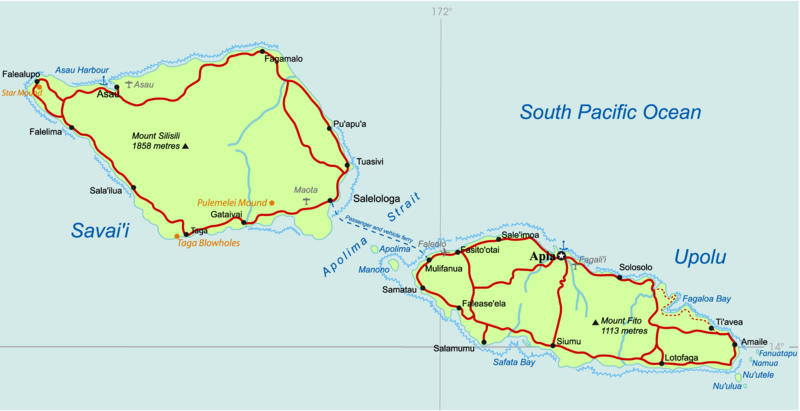
- Map of Samoa showing Upolu at right

- Location of Upolu in the Samoan Islands

Geography
- Location: Pacific Ocean
- Coordinates: 13°55′S 171°45′W
- Area: 1,125 km^{2} (434 sq mi)
- Length: 75 km (46.6 mi)
- Highest elevation: 1,113 m (3652 ft)
- Highest point: Mount Vaivai

Administration
- Samoa
- Largest settlement: Apia (pop. ~35,000)

Demographics
- Population: 143,418 (2011)
- Pop. density: 127/km^{2} (329/sq mi)
- Ethnic groups: 92.6% Samoans, 7% Euronesians (persons of European and Polynesian blood), 0.4% Europeans

Upolu is an island in Samoa, formed by a massive basaltic shield volcano which rises from the seafloor of the western Pacific Ocean. The island is 75 kilometres (47 miles) long and 1,125 square kilometres (434 square miles) in area, making it the second largest of the Samoan Islands by area. With approximately 145,000 inhabitants, it is by far the most populous of the Samoan Islands. Upolu is situated to the southeast of Savai'i, the "big island". Apia, the capital, is in the middle of the north coast, and Faleolo International Airport at the western end of the island. The island has not had any historically recorded eruptions, although there is evidence of three lava flows, dating back only to between a few hundred and a few thousand years ago.

In the Samoan branch of Polynesian mythology, Upolu was the first woman on the island.

James Michener based his character Bloody Mary in Tales of the South Pacific (later a major character in the Rodgers and Hammerstein musical, South Pacific) on the owner of Aggie Grey's Hotel on the south end of the island. She was still running the hotel in 1960. A branch was later opened in Apia, overlooking the harbor.

== History ==
In 1841, the island was the site of the Bombardment of Upolu, an incident during the United States Exploring Expedition.

In the late 19th century, the Scottish writer Robert Louis Stevenson owned a 400-acre (160-hectare) estate in the village of Vailima in Upolu. He died there in 1894 and is buried at the top of Mount Vaea overlooking his former estate. The Vailima estate was purchased in 1900 to serve as the official residence for the German governor of German Samoa. When the British/Dominion took over governance of the islands, they confiscated the estate and put it to the same use. It later served as the residence for the New Zealand administrator and, after independence, for the Samoan head of state. During World War II, the US Navy built Naval Base Upolu on the island.

=== 2009 Samoa tsunami ===
The island of Upolu was hit by a tsunami at 06:48:11 local time on 29 September 2009 (17:48:11 UTC). Twenty villages on Upolu's south side were reportedly destroyed, including Lepā, the home of Samoa's prime minister, Tuila'epa Sa'ilele Malielegaoi. In Lepā, only the church and the village's welcome sign remained standing after the disaster.

=== 2024 HMNZS Manawanui sinking ===
On 5 October 2024 the Royal New Zealand Navy ship HMNZS Manawanui ran aground and sank off the coast of Siumu on the southern coast of Upolu. The Manawanui had been surveying a nearby reef and was caught up in a storm. The sinking of the Manawanui polluted the surrounding sea and disrupted the livelihoods of local communities in the Safata district, who were unable to fish due to restrictions around the wreckage site. The Samoan and New Zealand authorities were criticised by local villagers for a lack of compensation and engagement with local communities. This led local villagers to seek financial assistance from the Chinese Embassy in Apia.

On 12 February 2025 the Samoan Government lifted a "precautionary zone" around the wreckage of HMNZS Manawanui following testing by the Scientific Research Organisation of Samoa (SROS). However, a two km prohibition zone around the sunken ship remained in force.

== Wildlife ==
The Samoan moss spider (Patu marplesi), an extremely small species of spider, lives on Upolu. According to the Guinness Book of World Records, the spider is the size of a period (full stop) on a printed page.

== Depictions in popular culture ==
Upolu was the filming location for the 1953 South Seas film Return to Paradise, starring Gary Cooper.

The island was also the filming location for several seasons of several editions of the competition reality television series, Survivor. This included:

- Seven seasons of Australian Survivor: the 3rd season in 2016 and the 4th season in 2017; Australian Survivor: Heroes vs Villains in 2023 (10th season); Australian Survivor: Titans vs Rebels in 2024 (11th season); Australian Survivor: Brains vs Brawn II in 2025 (12th season); Australian Survivor: Australia V The World in 2025 (13th season); Australian Survivor: Redemption in 2026 (14th season).
- Four seasons of the American version of Survivor, Survivor: Samoa (19th season); Survivor: Heroes vs. Villains (20th season); Survivor: South Pacific (23rd season); and Survivor: One World (24th season).
- One season of Survivor South Africa: Survivor South Africa: Island of Secrets (7th season) in 2019.

== Gallery ==
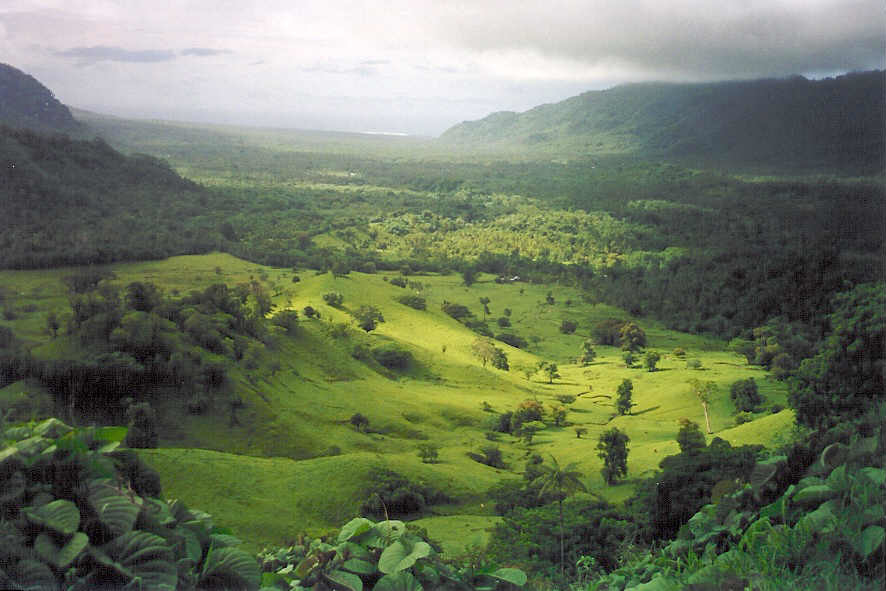
Falefa Valley

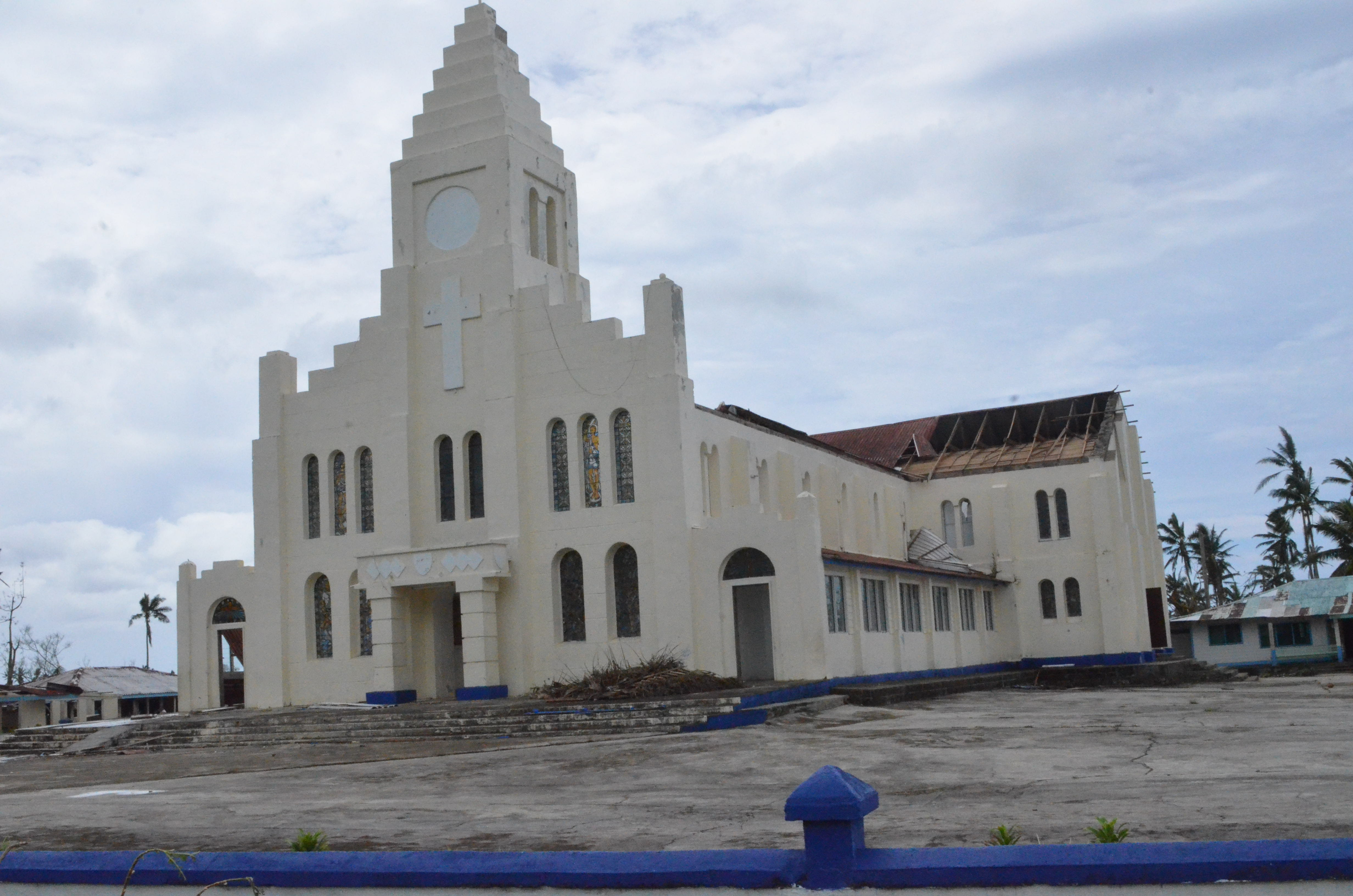
Damage from Cyclone Evan in 2012

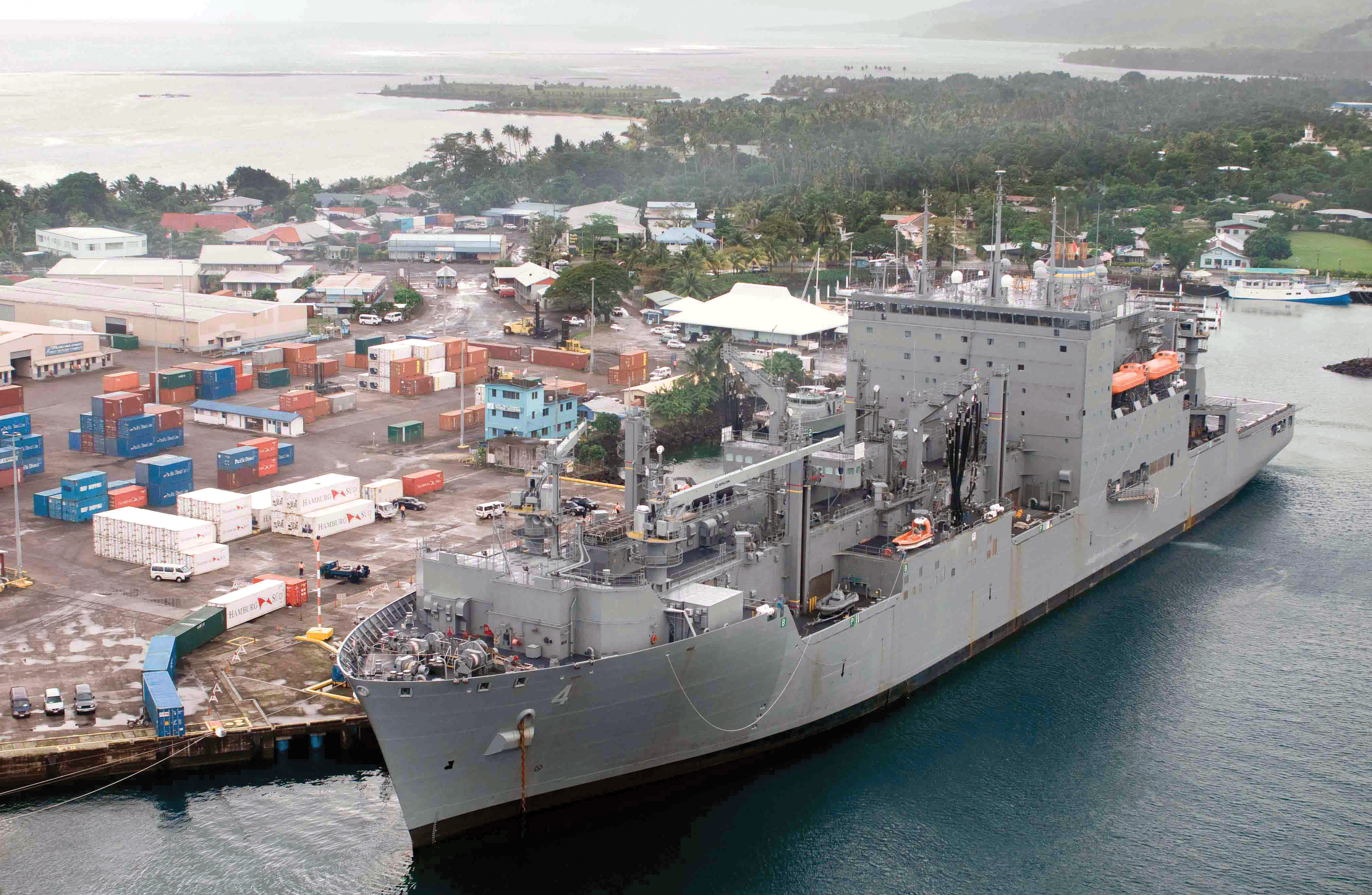
USNS Richard E. Byrd docked at Upolu

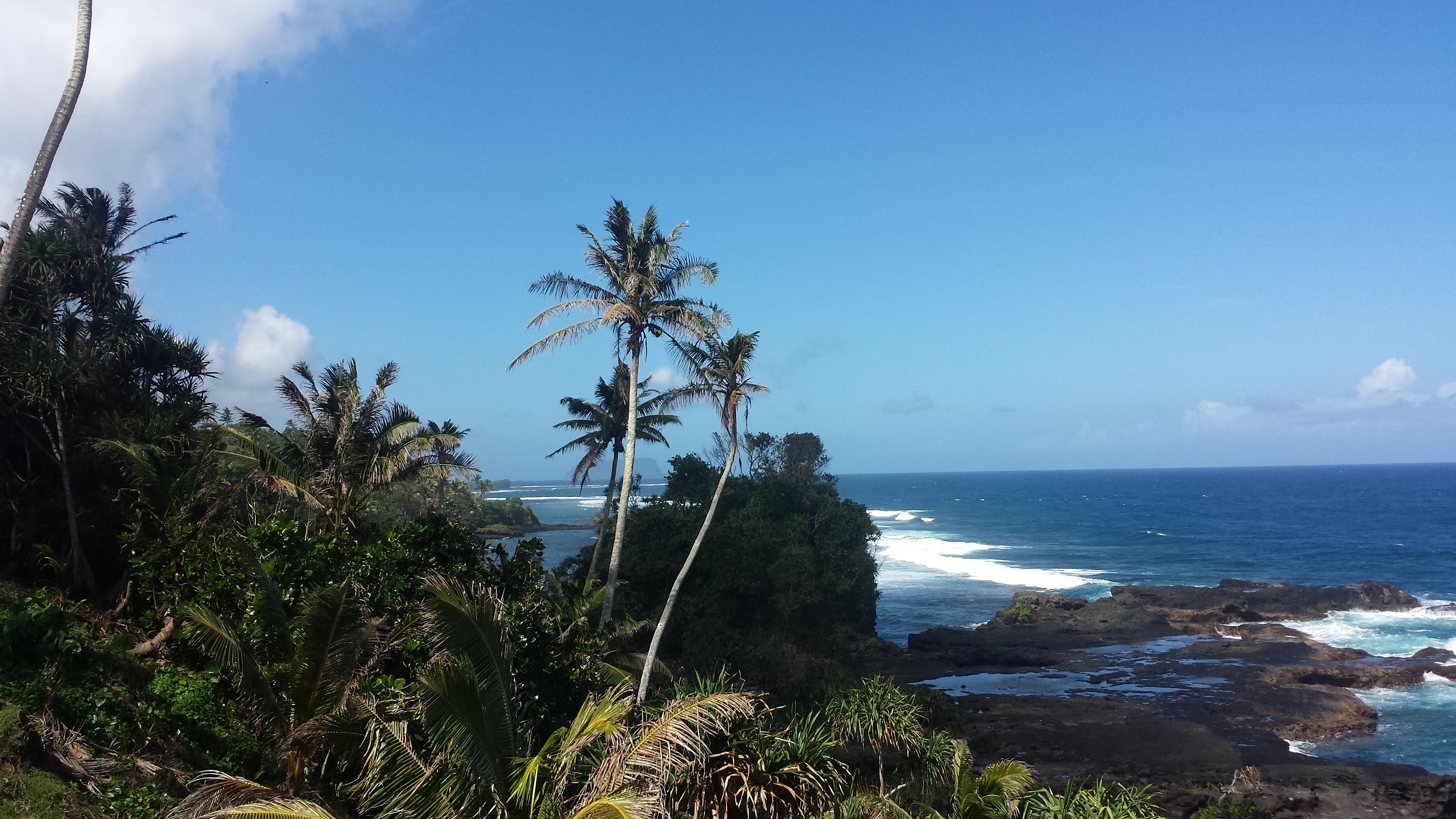
The south-eastern coast of Upolu, Nu'utele island can be seen in the far distance.

== See also ==
- 1889 Apia cyclone
- Archaeology of Samoa
- Samoa Tourism Authority
