= Australian Survivor: Titans V Rebels =

Season of television series Australian Survivor

- Season 11
- Presented by: Jonathan LaPaglia
- No. of days: 47
- No. of castaways: 24
- Winner: Feras Basal
- Runner-up: Caroline Courtis
- Location: Upolu, Samoa
- No. of episodes: 24

Release
- Original network: Network 10
- Original release: 29 January – 19 March 2024

Additional information
- Filming dates: 1 August – 16 September 2023

Season chronology
- ← Previous; Heroes V Villains Next → Brains V Brawn II

Australian Survivor: Titans V Rebels is the eleventh season of Australian Survivor, which premiered on Network 10 on 29 January 2024 and is based on the international reality competition franchise Survivor.

In this season, twenty-four contestants were stranded in Samoa and divided into two tribes: "Titans", composed of twelve high-achievers who excelled in their fields, and "Rebels", composed of twelve peoeple with a rebellious nature. Feras Basal was named the winner of the season, defeating Caroline Courtis in a 9–0 vote.

The season was filmed in Upolu, Samoa, the same location of the previous season.

== Contestants ==
The 24 contestants are divided into two tribes based on their respective approaches to life, as either a "Titan" or a "Rebel". The cast includes AFL footballers Nathan Freeman and Kirby Bentley as contestants.

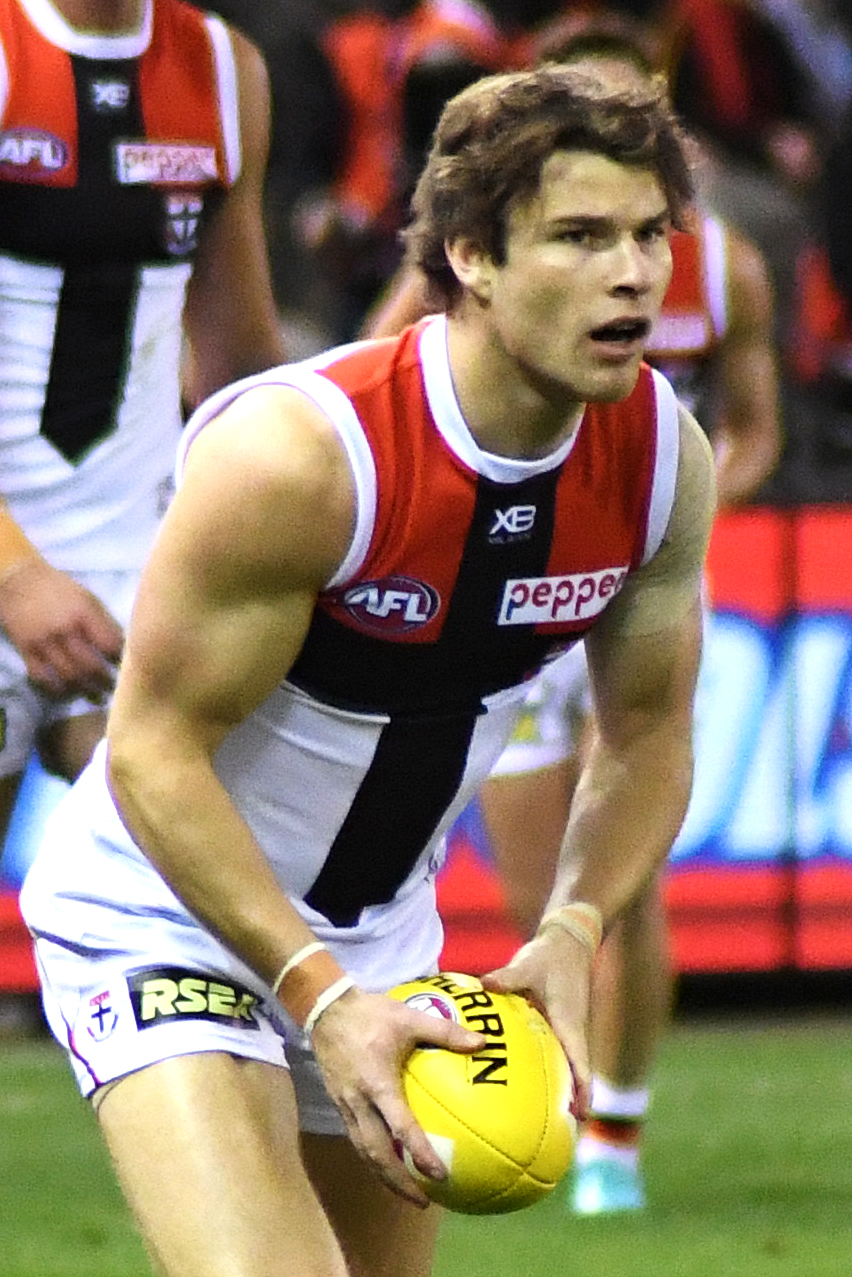
Nathan Freeman

List of Australian Survivor: Titans V Rebels contestants
Contestant	Original tribes (Note: Kelli temporarily joined the Titans as a Saboteur on Day 12, tasked to Sabotage the next Immunity Challenge for the Titans Tribe. The Titans tribe subsequently lost the next Immunity Challenge, thus Kelli returned to the Rebels Tribe on Day 14.)	Shuffled tribes	Post-Swap tribes	Merged tribes	Finish
Frankie Guascoine 33, Sydney, NSW	Titans				1st voted out Day 2
Jessica Danaher 33, Melbourne, VIC	Titans				2nd voted out Day 5
Peta Bennett 33, Perth, WA	Rebels				3rd voted out Day 7
Tobias Grant 41, Byron Bay, NSW	Rebels				4th voted out Day 9
Nathan Freeman 28, Melbourne, VIC	Titans				5th voted out Day 14
Viola Jokudu 22, Sydney, NSW	Titans	Rebels			6th voted out Day 16
Sarah Moore 24, Newcastle, NSW	Rebels	Rebels			7th voted out Day 18
Garrick Wildman 59, Gold Coast, QLD	Rebels	Titans			8th voted out Day 20
Charles Noonan 35, Melbourne, VIC	Titans	Titans			9th voted out Day 21
Kelli Harris 55, Cairns, QLD	Rebels	Titans	Titans		10th voted out Day 25
Scott Butler 31, Hobart, TAS	Rebels	Titans	Titans	Tasi	Quit; Day 27
Winna Bhun 25, Sydney, NSW	Titans	Titans	Titans	Tasi	11th voted out Day 29
Eden Porter 39, Melbourne, VIC	Titans	Rebels	Rebels	Tasi	12th voted out Day 31
Aileen Chong 26, Melbourne, VIC	Rebels	Titans	Titans	Tasi	13th voted out 1st jury member Day 33
Jaden Laing 27, Upper Coomera, QLD	Titans	Rebels	Rebels	Tasi	14th voted out 2nd jury member Day 35
Valeria Sizova 31, Sydney, NSW	Titans	Titans	Titans	Tasi	15th voted out 3rd jury member Day 37
Alex Coe 26, Perth, WA	Rebels	Rebels	Titans	Tasi	16th voted out 4th jury member Day 39
Rianna Bowley 31, Adelaide, SA	Rebels	Rebels	Rebels	Tasi	17th voted out 5th jury member Day 41
Kitty Blomfield 42, Gold Coast, QLD	Titans	Rebels	Rebels	Tasi	18th voted out 6th jury member Day 42
Kirby Bentley 37, Melbourne, VIC	Rebels	Titans	Titans	Tasi	19th voted out 7th jury member Day 44
Raymond Chaney 27, Central Coast, NSW	Rebels	Titans	Titans	Tasi	20th voted out 8th jury member Day 45
Mark Warnock 35, Townsville, QLD	Titans	Rebels	Rebels	Tasi	21st voted out 9th jury member Day 46
Caroline Courtis 55, Melbourne, VIC	Titans	Rebels	Rebels	Tasi	Runner-up; Day 47
Feras Basal 28, Sydney, NSW	Rebels	Titans	Titans	Tasi	Sole Survivor; Day 47

=== Future appearances ===
In 2025, Kirby Bentley competed on Australian Survivor: Australia V The World. In 2026, Mark Warnock competed on Australian Survivor: Redemption.

In 2026, Kirby competed on the third season of The Traitors.

== Season summary ==
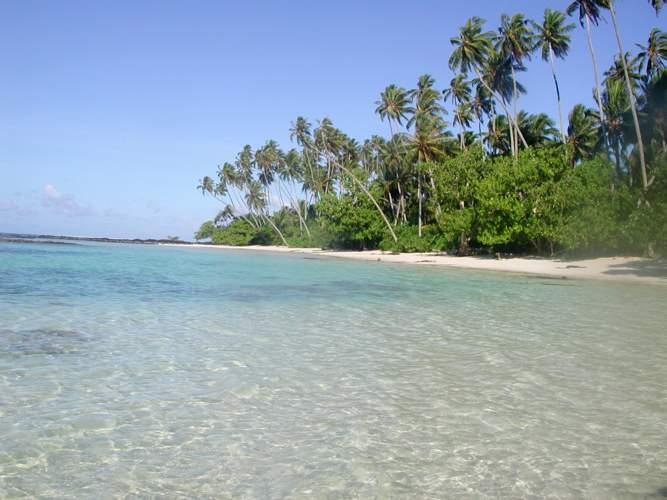
The season filmed in Upolu in Samoa.

Twenty-four new contestants were divided into two tribes: "Titans", known for being the top of their profession, and "Rebels", known for their free-spirited nature. Both tribes turned against their athletic players early, ousting physically strong players before the merge. The Titans were largely controlled by the “Middle Aged Mafia” alliance of older players like Caroline and Mark, while the Rebels saw strategic minds Kirby and Feras butt heads and seek to weaken one another's influence.

After a tribe swap, Caroline took control of the new Rebels tribe, double-crossing former ally Mark by blindsiding Viola. Kirby and Feras fought for control of the new Titans tribe, with players like Valeria playing the middle and keeping both sides at each other's throats. The power players weakened one another by removing their closest allies, but keeping the other threats in the game as future shields.

When the tribes merged, the original Titans and original Rebels began plotting against each other with a few floaters in the middle. Two primary opposing groups formed, one led by Feras and Kirby in the majority and another led by Caroline and Mark in the minority. However, the former Rebels turned on one another near the end, with Feras and Raymond betraying Kirby and Rianna as major threats while Mark won key immunity challenges to keep himself alive.

Feras won the final immunity challenge to take out Mark, and he and Caroline faced the jury. Caroline was criticized for failing to make any big substantial moves, while Feras was questioned about his decision-making with idols. Caroline defended her attempts to swing the game that did not work out, while Feras explained how he deceived people and created paranoia by holding onto his idol for so long. The jury unanimously voted for Feras, awarding him $500,000 and the title of Sole Survivor.

Challenge winners and eliminations by episode

Tribal phase (Days 1–25)
Episode			Challenge winner(s)		Eliminated	Finish
No.	Title	Original air date	Reward	Immunity	Eliminated	Finish
1	"We've All Seen; This Movie"	29 January 2024	Rebels	Rebels	Frankie	1st voted out Day 2
2	"The Invisible Hand"	30 January 2024	Titans	Rebels	Jessica	2nd voted out Day 5
3	"The Cuddle Club"	31 January 2024	Titans	Titans	Peta	3rd voted out Day 7
4	"B is for Blindside"	4 February 2024	Rebels	Titans	Tobias	4th voted out Day 9
5	"Where Angels; Fear to Tread"	5 February 2024	Rebels	Titans	No elimination on Day 12 due to saboteur vote. (Note: Jonathan informed the Rebels at Tribal Council of Day 12 that instead of voting someone out, they would vote someone to join the Titans tribe as a Saboteur. If the Saboteur makes the Titans lose the next immunity challenge, they will return to the Rebels tribe. If the Saboteur fails to sabotage the Titans, the Saboteur will remain on Titans. Kelli was voted to go to the Titans tribe and the Titans tribe subsequently lost the next Immunity Challenge, thus Kelli returned to the Rebels Tribe before the vote commenced at Tribal Council.)	
6	"The Saboteur"	6 February 2024	Rebels	Rebels	Nathan	5th voted out Day 14
7	"Get, Or Get Got"	11 February 2024	None (Note: No Reward Challenge, due to Tribe Swap.)	Titans	Viola	6th voted out Day 16
8	"The Divorce"	12 February 2024	None	Titans	Sarah	7th voted out Day 18
9	"Excited For; The Actions"	13 February 2024	Titans	Rebels	Garrick	8th voted out Day 20
10	"Bad Hair Day"	18 February 2024	None	Rebels	Charles	9th voted out Day 21
10	"Bad Hair Day"	18 February 2024	None	Aileen, Feras, Kirby (Note: At Day 21's Tribal Council a special individual challenge was held, for the right to vote and immunity. This was won by Aileen, Feras and Kirby.)	Charles	9th voted out Day 21
11	"It's Not Sarong, It's So Right"	19 February 2024	None	Titans	No elimination on Day 23 due to a tribe swap vote. (Note: Jonathan informed the Rebels at Tribal Council of Day 23 that instead of voting someone out, they would vote someone to draw rocks to join the Titans tribe.)	
12	"To Infinity And Beyond"	20 February 2024	Feast or Clue; Dilemma (Note: Instead of a Reward Challenge, everyone was offered a dilemma between enjoying a feast or taking an idol clue to their beach.)	Rebels	Kelli	10th voted out Day 25

Merge phase (Days 26–47)
Episode			Challenge winner(s)		Eliminated	Finish
No.	Title	Original air date	Reward	Immunity	Eliminated	Finish
13	"Revenge Is a Dish; Best Served Russian"	25 February 2024	Valeria (Note: This Reward Challenge included Immunity by allowing the winner to attend Tribal Council as a spectator with no risk of being voted off but with no vote to cast.)		Scott	Quit; Day 27
13	"Revenge Is a Dish; Best Served Russian"	25 February 2024		Winna	Scott	Quit; Day 27
14	"A Line in the Sand"	26 February 2024	None	Rianna	Winna	11th voted out Day 29
15	"Master and Apprentice"	27 February 2024	Mark [Caroline, Kitty, Valeria]	Jaden	Eden	12th voted out Day 31
16	"The Wedge"	3 March 2024	Survivor; Auction	Kitty	Aileen	13th voted out 1st jury member Day 33
17	"Floater or Flexible?"	4 March 2024	None	Rianna	Jaden	14th voted out 2nd jury member Day 35
18	"The Best Actor Award"	5 March 2024	Alex [Feras, Kitty, Valeria]	~~Kirby~~ (Rianna) (Note: Kirby won the Immunity Challenge but gave her necklace to Rianna at Tribal Council.)	Valeria	15th voted out 3rd jury member Day 37
19	"How do Rainbows Work?"	10 March 2024	Alex [Caroline, Kirby, Rianna]	Rianna	Alex	16th voted out 4th jury member Day 39
20	"Pride & Paranoia"	11 March 2024	None	Kirby	Rianna	17th voted out 5th jury member Day 41
21	"How to Build A Resume"	12 March 2024	None	Kirby	Kitty	18th voted out 6th jury member Day 42
22	"Dilemmas of the End"	17 March 2024	None	Mark	Kirby	19th voted out 7th jury member Day 44
23	"A Nation of One"	18 March 2024	None	Mark	Raymond	20th voted out 8th jury member Day 45
24	"The Fire That I Can Bring"	19 March 2024	None	Feras	Mark	21st voted out 9th jury member Day 46
24	"The Fire That I Can Bring"	19 March 2024			Final vote	
24	"The Fire That I Can Bring"	19 March 2024			Caroline	Runner-up; Day 47
24	"The Fire That I Can Bring"	19 March 2024			Feras	Sole Survivor; Day 47

== Episodes ==
No. overall	No. in season	Title	Timeline	Original release date
223	1	"We've All Seen This Movie"	Days 1–2	29 January 2024
Twenty-four new contestants are divided into two tribes of twelve: “Titans”, representing the best of their respective professions, and “Rebels”, embodying a more free-spirited nature. Jonathan welcomes the new players and introduces them to their first reward challenge.: Reward challenge: Players race out to a pontoon in the ocean to gather fire-making materials and bring them back to the beach. They then must construct a fire large enough to light a large wooden totem and burn their tribe flag atop it. First team to finish wins flint to bring back to camp.; Rebels win reward, and return to camp to introduce themselves. Alex takes charge of constructing a shelter and comments on the tribe unity, though Kelli is starting to grate on people's nerves. At the Titans beach, Eden is worried about the number of strong men on his tribe and bonds instead with the older players like Mark. Valeria forms a tight bond with Viola and plans to work with her to the end. Jess suggests to Nathan that they target Frankie first, but Nathan is close with Frankie and shares this with the rest of the tribe, painting Jess as sneaky.: Immunity challenge: Each tribe works together to navigate a heavy wrecking ball through an obstacle course. They must then roll the ball down a ramp to smash a series of targets. First team to smash all their targets wins immunity.; Rebels win immunity. Nathan and Frankie begin to rally votes against Jess, but Eden feels left out of the decision-making process. He and Mark point out the dynamic of the strong players banding together and suggest breaking up the power trio of Nathan, Frankie and Jaden. At Tribal Council, many in the tribe remain optimistic despite their rough start. Caroline points out the lack of strong leadership to guide the tribe. Jessica suggests that there are different types of strength in the challenges, and physical strength shouldn’t be the only factor considered. When the votes are read, Frankie is blindsided 8–4 over Jess, making her the first person voted out of the game.
224	2	"The Invisible Hand"	Days 3–5	30 January 2024
At the Rebels camp, Kelli is starting to annoy people with her loud personality, and Alex predicts that she won’t last longer than three Tribal Councils. Sarah bonds with Tobias over their shared free-spirited nature, and views Raymond as sneaky and aloof. At the Titans camp, Nathan plays it cool despite being upset over Frankie's blindside. Mark and Eden celebrate their successful play and hope to remain in the shadows as the “invisible hand” guiding the votes while letting others like Jess take the credit.: Reward challenge: Tribe members take turns in rounds of group tug-of-war over sealed crates. The winners of each round keep the contents of their crate for their tribe.; Titans win three rounds, winning fishing gear, a bunch of bananas, and a tarp and hammock; Rebels win one round, winning s'mores. Back at the Titans camp, Winna finds an idol clue hidden inside a banana, sharing it with Jaden to solidify their alliance. The next morning, Winna sneaks out of camp early and locates the idol.: Immunity challenge: Tribes race through an obstacle course and free coconuts from an overhead chute. Tribe members then throw coconuts into a basket being held up by members of the opposing tribe. First tribe to force their opponents to drop their basket wins immunity.; Rebels win immunity. Jess doesn’t trust Eden and wants to vote him out, but when she suggests this plan to Mark, he begins to rally votes against Jess instead. He elects not to tell Eden so as not to spook him, but Eden finds out anyway, and begins to scramble to split the votes between Jess and Nathan to protect himself from a potential idol play. At Tribal Council, Eden feels nervous about his name coming up and isn’t super confident in the vote going his way. Nathan feels better about this vote than the last, hoping that he won’t be left in the dark again. Jess takes credit for Frankie's blindside and admits to throwing out Eden's name. Mark feels that he learned a lot about each player's game style in tonight's Tribal, which may influence his vote. When the votes are read, Eden's plan is successful, and Jess becomes the second person voted out in a 6–4–1 split vote.
225	3	"The Cuddle Club"	Days 6–7	31 January 2024
At the Titans camp, Eden celebrates another successful vote and vows to eliminate anyone who targets him in the future. He solidifies a new alliance with Mark, Caroline and Kitty, dubbing themselves the "Middle Aged Mafia". At the Rebels camp, Peta feels tight with the other physically-fit players, and does not get along well with Kelli and Raymond, hoping to target them first. Kirby is annoyed by Peta's over-confidence and worries about how tight she is with her "cuddle crew" alliance of Alex, Tobias and Sarah. Kirby hopes to work instead with Feras and Garrick, admiring their under-the-radar dispositions.: Reward challenge: Two members of each tribe square off in a net cage in the ocean, attempting to prevent the other tribe from climbing out of the cage and scoring a point. First tribe to three points wins a reward of canned food goods.; Titans win reward, though they are disappointed by the sparse food in their cans. Nathan hopes to pull in some of the female Rebels after a tribe swap, because they flirted with him at the last challenge. At the Rebels camp, Peta finds a hidden immunity idol and shares it with Alex to solidify their “Barbie and Ken” alliance. They pitch the idea of throwing the next immunity challenge to vote out Raymond or Kelli.: Immunity challenge: Tribes load sandbags onto a pole to reach a machete, then use the machete to cut open bags to free balls within. They must then use a slingshot to fire the balls into a wall of puzzle pieces, then re-assemble the pieces into a completed puzzle.; Titans win immunity. Back at the Rebels camp, Alex is excited to go to Tribal Council and crafts a plan to split the votes between Kelli and Raymond. Garrick and Feras suspect that the cuddle crew threw the challenge, and Kirby suggests that they target Peta to break them up. Kelli worries that she might have an idol, but Kirby reassures her that she won’t see the vote coming. At Tribal Council, Raymond says that he likes "most" of his tribe mates, and Peta theorises that she is excluded from that group. Kelli knows she is on the chopping block and worries that a tight-knit majority will vote her out. Feras is excited about the vote and hopes to "make an example" out of someone tonight. Players speculate about a potential idol, and Alex suggests it should be played tonight, while Feras disagrees and thinks it is too early. When the votes are read, Peta declines to play her idol, and she is blindsided in a 6–3–3 vote over Kelli and Raymond, becoming the third person voted out.
226	4	"B is for Blindside"	Days 8–9	4 February 2024
At the Titans camp, Caroline is concerned about how close her ally Mark is with Valeria and Viola and wants to keep a close eye on them. Valeria notices this and tells Mark that she doesn’t trust Caroline. At the Rebels camp, Aileen feels somewhat on the outs with her socially-extroverted tribe mates and wants to be more assertive. Alex feels foolish for throwing the challenge after Peta's blindside and still wants Kelli out, but knows he has to make amends with the tribe to stay safe. Garrick and Feras are annoyed with Kirby for changing her last vote without telling them. Feras finds a buried box with a padlock on it, vowing to find a way to open it.: Reward challenge: One member of each tribe races to ring a bell, while an opposing player attempts to block them. First tribe to ring the bell three times wins a charcuterie board and champagne.; Rebels win reward, and return to camp to enjoy their food and drink. The board also includes three keys, which the tribe speculates about, but Feras knows they must unlock the buried box he found. The tribe spreads out to search, while Feras leads Garrick to the box and opens it, which contains an idol and a key that unlocks a box on the other tribe's beach. He is caught by Alex, who alerts the rest of the tribe, and Feras lies about the idol, sharing only the key with them. Before the next immunity challenge, Feras openly asks the Titans tribe if anyone has found their tribe's "treasure box" yet, which they seem confused about. He later describes the box to Mark and instructs him to look for it on Titans beach.: Immunity challenge: Members of each tribe take turns throwing balls at one another, attempting to knock out the other tribe's strikers. First tribe to win three rounds wins immunity.; Titans win immunity. Aileen crafts a plan to split the votes onto Alex and Tobias, but is nervous about Kelli messing up the plan. Feras lies to Alex that they are voting Kelli, but Alex wants to blindside Feras, whom everyone is already suspicious about. Feras still doesn’t trust Kirby fully and considers playing his idol in case she decides to flip her vote again. At Tribal Council, Feras says he hoped to sow chaos and confusion among the Titans with his question at the last challenge. Alex reflects on his turbulent relationship with Kelli and the importance of being patient with one another. Tobias feels calm about the vote and didn’t feel the need to scramble. Feras comments that the vote seems too easy and is suspicious that there might be another plan in place. Before the votes are read, Feras plays his idol, negating three votes against him. Tobias earns five votes against Alex's three after Kelli flips her vote and Tobias becomes the fourth person voted out.
227	5	"Where Angels Fear to Tread"	Days 10–12	5 February 2024
At the Rebels camp, Sarah is upset about Tobias leaving, and Kelli tearfully confesses to changing her vote, but doesn’t explain why. Privately, she hopes she can work with Alex moving forward, but Alex still doesn’t trust her or Feras. Feras and Kirby make amends and vow to work together moving forward, but privately still distrust one another. At the Titans camp, the tribe speculates about the "treasure box" Feras mentioned, but some believe he made it up to mess with their heads. Mark goes searching for it with Valeria and Viola and finds it, but has no way to open it.: Reward challenge: One member of each tribe is tethered to two idols on pedestals, and fights to knock off both of their opponents' idols before theirs fall. First tribe to win four rounds wins a kids' party.; Rebels win reward, and enjoy food and drink while going over children's photos of themselves. Kirby remarks on how untrustworthy Feras is and hopes to stay one step ahead of him.: Immunity challenge: Tribes use puzzle planks to traverse an obstacle course, then construct a puzzle and knock it down with sandbags. First tribe to finish wins immunity.; Titans win immunity. At the Rebels camp, the tribe is frustrated with Kelli's failures in the challenge after volunteering for a key role. However, Kirby sees her as valuable distraction, whereas Feras is a huge threat she can't trust. She brings in Alex as a number, but he informs Feras about her deception. Feras suggests targeting Rianna to weaken Kirby's power in the tribe. At Tribal Council, Kirby stresses the importance of having the right people in the right places to win challenges. Alex and Kelli argue over who cost them today's challenge. Jonathan informs the tribe that tonight they will not be voting someone out of the game, but voting to send someone to the other tribe as a saboteur. If that person successfully sends the Titans to the next Tribal Council, they will rejoin the Rebels; otherwise, they will stay on the Titans. Kirby does not want Feras to go because he has the key to the Titans' treasure box, and lobbies to send Kelli instead. Kelli does not want to go and suggests Feras instead. When the votes are read, Kelli receives nine votes to Raymond's one, and she is sent to the Titans tribe.
228	6	"The Saboteur"	Days 13–14	6 February 2024
Kelli arrives at the Titans camp and explains why she was evicted from her tribe, but is vague about the true nature of the "treasure box", causing suspicion. Nathan worries about his future in the tribe, hoping that Kelli's arrival will take some of the heat off of him and the other strong players. Mark returns to the treasure box and breaks it open, retrieving the idol within and sharing the news with Valeria and Viola. At the Rebels camp, Alex celebrates the peace and quiet that comes with Kelli's departure, but hopes she will return to them after the next Tribal Council. Scott tells Kirby that Rianna was Feras' original target, concerning Kirby and causing her to trust Feras even less.: Reward challenge: Tribe members balance in pairs against each other's backs with their feet on footholds over the ocean. At intervals, they must move down to narrower footholds. Last tribe with a pair still upright wins a reward of toasted pastries and coffee.; Rebels win reward. Feras sneaks off with Raymond while the others eat to look for an idol, finding one in a tree. He tells Alex about his idol, hoping to cause fear and confusion with the tribe. At the Titans camp, Caroline is annoyed by how much more food the strong men are eating than everyone else, and sees Nathan as a drag on the tribe. Kelli contemplates her mission as a saboteur and wonders if she would be better off staying with her new tribe.: Immunity challenge: Tribes untangle rope to unlock paddles from a chest, then paddle out to retrieve puzzle pieces from the ocean. They must then manoeuvre the pieces to the top of a tower and assemble them into a word puzzle. First tribe to finish wins immunity.; Rebels win immunity. At the Titans camp, Kelli reflects on her decision to sit out the immunity challenge, saying she likes her new tribe mates and didn’t want to sabotage them. Caroline begins rallying votes to get rid of Nathan, and the majority crafts a plan to split the vote onto Jaden in case of an idol. However, Mark contemplates getting rid of Caroline instead to solidify his secondary alliance with Valeria and Viola. Viola informs Winna and Jaden of the plan, and they agree, but they are slightly suspicious of her motives. At Tribal Council, Jonathan informs the tribe that Kelli's mission is complete, and she is sent back to Rebels camp. Nathan knows he has been on the chopping block in recent votes but feels better about his chances tonight. Eden and Valeria comment that no one should ever feel too secure in the game. Jaden expresses confusion about tonight's plan and hopes for a clue from somebody about what to do. When the votes are read, Nathan is voted out 6–3–1 over Jaden and Caroline, becoming the fifth person voted out of the game.
229	7	"Get, Or Get Got"	Days 15–16	11 February 2024
Kelli returns to the Rebels tribe and claims to have orchestrated Nathan's vote-out, but is criticised for volunteering to sit out of the immunity challenge. She is unable to answer questions about alliances and power structures on the Titans tribe, making her tribe suspicious. Kirby fills Kelli in on the new tribe dynamics and paints Feras as a dangerous player. At the Titans camp, Eden and Caroline discuss Mark's close relationship with Viola and Valeria and contemplate making a move to break them up. Mark senses this possibility and suggests going after Caroline to protect themselves. The tribes arrive at the reward challenge and are instructed to drop their buffs for a tribe swap. Raymond is given his choice of tribes and chooses the Titans. The tribes are then sent back to camp to get to know each other. At the new Titans camp, Valeria is frustrated that her old allies were all sent to the Rebels, and is in a minority along with Winna and Charles. However, she plans to be hospitable and endear herself to the old Rebels through food. Kirby is separated from Rianna and still stuck with Feras, but both agree to set their differences aside and stay old Rebels strong for the time being. At the new Rebels camp, Alex feels outnumbered on his new tribe and doesn’t see any cracks in the old Titans yet. Mark celebrates his “Middle Aged Mafia” alliance remaining intact, but worries about how Valeria will fare on the other tribe. Viola doesn’t fully trust her former allies and worries that Caroline and Eden could flip on her.: Immunity challenge: Players balance a ball on small gutters, working together to pass the ball from one gutter to the next. First tribe to transfer their ball to the end of the line wins immunity.; Titans win immunity. Back at the Rebels camp, Rianna worries that she could be an easy vote tonight in the minority, and spills old tribe secrets to her new tribe to appear useful. Mark suggests a split vote between Rianna and Sarah, with Rianna going home as the bigger social threat. However, Viola and Caroline don’t trust each other and approach their respective allies about targeting the other. Eden is concerned about blowing up the alliance too soon and ruining their numbers advantage. Mark is also wary about striking too early and wants to stay old Titans strong. At Tribal Council, Rianna comments on tribal divisions and believes there are no cracks in the old Titans alliance, while Alex hopes the tribe will keep him for his strength. Mark suggests that the old Rebels could be easy votes or easy numbers to use to make a move, but he and Viola espouse loyalty to their old tribe. Eden discusses the importance of timing moves properly to not wind up the target. When the votes are read, Caroline's blindside is successful, and Viola becomes the sixth person voted out of the game.
230	8	"The Divorce"	Days 17–18	12 February 2024
At the Titans camp, Feras and Scott discuss possibly picking off the old Titans members first, but Feras is nervous about Kirby betraying her. He talks to Winna, Charles and Valeria about how untrustworthy she is, and Valeria weighs the merits of siding with Feras or Kirby. At the Rebels camp, Caroline and Mark make amends after the Viola blindside, but privately Mark is furious and wants revenge, approaching Alex about breaking up his old alliance.: Immunity challenge: Tribes manoeuvre a heavy cart of puzzle pieces through an obstacle course, then use the pieces inside to solve a puzzle. First tribe to finish wins immunity.; Titans win immunity. Back at the Rebels camp, Caroline crafts a plan to split the vote between Sarah and Rianna, but Mark secretly plans to join the old Rebels in voting out Kitty. Rianna and Sarah are unsure if they can trust Mark, and tell Kitty about his plan, but she doesn’t believe this and relays this back to Mark. Mark decides to continue with his plan anyway and switch the vote to Caroline, informing the old Rebels about his idol. Alex tells Sarah and Rianna about the original split vote plan between them, and Sarah quickly runs off to tell Kitty and Eden. Sarah realises that Mark was telling the truth and she has to vote with him to survive. At Tribal Council, Rianna comments on the cracks in the majority alliance after Viola's blindside, hoping she can exploit them to survive. Eden comments on the confusion and chaos at camp and hopes everyone can block out the noise. Sarah felt left out of many conversations today and is not sure whom to trust. Eden decides to secretly change the split plan at the last second and put all the majority votes on Sarah. Before the votes are read, Mark plays his idol, negating Rianna's vote against him. Sarah receives four votes to Caroline's three, becoming the seventh person voted out.
231	9	"Excited For The Actions"	Days 19–20	13 February 2024
At the Rebels camp, Mark apologises to Caroline for trying to blindside her, saying that he felt at the bottom of the alliance. They make amends and vow to work together again, with Caroline asking for a token of trust from Mark by voting how she tells him at the next tribal. At the Titans camp, Feras worries about Kelli's shifty behaviour, believing she has an idol. Kirby relays this belief to Kelli, who doesn’t have one, but plans to act otherwise to stir paranoia in Feras.: Reward challenge: Players race out to the ocean in pairs collecting coconuts with painted letters on them, bringing them back to their station to spell specific words. First tribe to win two rounds wins a Mexican feast.; Titans win reward. Kirby knows that Feras will be after her soon, and hopes to use the former Titans as numbers to strike at him first. Winna, Charles and Valeria weigh their options and discuss the merits of joining Feras or Kirby's alliance.: Immunity challenge: Each player holds up a heavy barrel. Players may drop out and pass their barrel to another tribe member, but if one person drops a barrel, the whole tribe loses. Last tribe standing wins immunity.; Rebels win immunity. At the Titans camp, Aileen implores the former Rebels majority to stick together, but Garrick is still dead-set on voting out Kirby. Raymond accidentally leaks this plan to Kelli, who relays it to Kirby, changing her plans. Scott suggests that they target Garrick in case Feras plays his idol, and Kirby agrees. Valeria, Winna and Charles consider which group to side with. At Tribal Council, Aileen comments on the power position the former Titans are in sitting in the middle. Charles sees it as a more precarious position, as one false step could make people distrust you. Kirby calls Feras paranoid, while Feras and Garrick say that she has been untrustworthy since Day 1. Garrick begins to feel nervous he is the one going home. Before the votes are read, Aileen tells Feras that he should play his idol for Garrick, but Feras declines. The former Titans side with Kirby's group and Garrick becomes the eighth person voted out.
232	10	"Bad Hair Day"	Day 21	18 February 2024
At the Titans camp, Feras is surprised by Garrick being voted out, feeling betrayed by the original Titans minority and wanting revenge, but plans to lay low and not appear too bitter. He continues to claim having an idol, but no one believes him, reasoning that he would've played it for Garrick. Aileen hopes to carry favour with Kirby by explaining why she didn’t vote for her at the last tribal. At the Rebels camp, Rianna feels unsure of her position in the tribe and hopes to survive to merge to reconnect with Kirby. Caroline confers with both Rianna and Mark and debates privately which one she trusts more.: Immunity challenge: Tribes manoeuvre a series of balls through an obstacle course and up a tower, then one player attempts to throw each ball into a cargo net held up on poles by the rest of the tribe. First tribe to catch all their balls wins immunity.; Rebels win immunity. Back at the Titans camp, Valeria crafts a plan to split the votes between Feras and Aileen, and asks Aileen to act as a spy against Feras and confirm the existence of his idol. Feras pitches his case for Kirby being too dangerous to let reach the merge, but Winna rejects his pitch outright. Winna reflects on how long he's had an idol for and hopes to keep it secret as long as possible. Aileen signals to the majority that Feras does have an idol despite not being sure, hoping that they will trust her enough to keep her around. At Tribal Council, Aileen pushes for the original Rebels to stay strong against the old Titans, and is rebuked by Charles for it, causing her and Feras to consider switching their votes onto him. Valeria criticises Feras for his poor leadership and for ignoring Aileen's opinion at the last vote. Scott reflects on the deep divisions in the tribe and doesn't believe they will be resolved easily. Jonathan informs the tribe that nobody's vote is guaranteed tonight, and brings them to a different part of the island for a surprise individual challenge.: Individual Immunity & Right to Vote challenge: Players build a frame out of blocks, then throw sandbags through the frame onto a barrel without knocking it over. First three players to land three sandbags gain the right to vote and are immune from tonight's vote.; Aileen, Kirby and Feras win immunity and a vote each. The tribe returns to Tribal Council, where Aileen reflects on how badly she needed to win tonight to survive. Kirby pitches to Aileen and Feras that she will vote however they want against a former Titan. Winna antagonises Feras, privately hoping to get the votes on himself so he can play his idol to blindside them. He privately asks Kirby who he should play his idol for, but she isn’t sure who the other two will vote for. Before the votes are read, Winna plays his idol for himself, negating one vote against him. However, Aileen and Feras split their vote between him and Charles; on the re-vote, Charles receives two votes to Raymond's one, becoming the ninth person voted out.
233	11	"It's Not Sarong, It's So Right"	Days 22–23	19 February 2024
At the Titans camp, Valeria is upset about losing one of her close allies, but is glad that Kirby stayed loyal despite the twist, planning to stick to her until the merge. Valeria criticises Aileen for not voting with the majority despite pretending to work with them, and makes it clear that she's next on the chopping block. At the Rebels camp, Mark feels like he has successfully made amends with Caroline after previously betraying her, but Caroline still doesn’t trust him and believes he may be too dangerous to take to merge.: Immunity challenge: Players balance on the side of a ramp holding onto a rope. At intervals, they must move higher up the ramp, making it more difficult to balance. Last tribe standing wins immunity.; Titans win immunity. Mark tells his "Middle Aged Mafia" allies that he’ll vote however they want, and they feed him a false plan to split the votes between Alex and Rianna, when in reality he is the target. However, Mark inserts himself into every conversation, making it difficult for everyone to keep their story straight with him. Caroline begins to have second thoughts and considers targeting Alex instead to simplify things. Jaden hears conflicting plans and isn't sure which one is the real one. At Tribal Council, the tribe expresses anxiety about returning after a long stretch of immunity, as much has changed since their last vote. The majority begins whispering to one another, still confused about who the real target is. Jonathan informs the tribe that they won't be sending anyone home tonight; instead, anyone who receives votes will have to draw rocks to determine who is sent to the Titans tribe. Eden discusses the potential benefits of solidifying established relationships by sending somebody like Rianna to the Titans. Caroline sees value in sending someone with no relationships over like Alex, to prevent side alliances from being formed. Alex believes he will be next on the chopping block if Rianna is sent to the other tribe. When the votes are read, Rianna and Alex receive all the votes; after a rock draw, Alex is sent to the Titans tribe.
234	12	"To Infinity And Beyond"	Days 24–25	20 February 2024
At the Titans camp, Feras is thrilled that Alex has joined the tribe, hoping that he will be a useful number in the future. Alex is annoyed by Kelli, but doesn’t want to antagonise her right away. Kirby is frustrated about Feras gaining a new ally and plots with the original Titans to break his group up. They suggest voting out Raymond, but Kelli refuses, feeling close to Raymond and believing it to be a wasted move.: Reward challenge: Each player is given their choice between a reward feast and a clue to a hidden immunity idol, with the latter returning to camp immediately.; Aileen, Feras and Alex each take a clue for the Titans; Rianna, Mark and Eden each take a clue for the Rebels. Everyone else arrives for the feast, where Valeria is disappointed that Mark isn’t there to explain what happened to Viola. Caroline and Kitty explain their reasoning for voting her out, but Valeria doesn’t believe them, vowing revenge against them. Kelli whispers tribe secrets to Kitty, painting Kirby as a ruthless leader, which Kirby overhears, making her realise Kelli is untrustworthy. Back at the Rebels camp, Rianna finds the idol first and Mark knows he's in trouble at the next tribal council. At the Titans camp, Feras spots the idol first but decides not to take it, allowing Alex to find it to take some of the heat off of himself.: Immunity challenge: Players race to score three balls in a series of nets in the ocean, while opposing players attempt to stop them. First tribe to win three rounds wins immunity.; Rebels win immunity. At the Titans camp, Kirby approaches Feras about voting out Kelli, which he agrees to. However, she is nervous about both Feras and Alex having idols, hoping to bait both of them into playing them despite not targeting either one. Scott and Winna speak to Feras hoping to plant seeds of doubt in him, which succeeds in making him paranoid. He speaks to Alex about a potential blindside against them and they both consider playing their idols tonight. At Tribal Council, Alex explains his decision to skip the feast in favor of an idol clue, feeling unsettled in his new tribe. Feras describes his paranoia at seeing so many unnecessary conversations around camp and Kirby expresses that anyone who has an idol should feel uncomfortable. Kelli expresses frustration at being dictated to about the vote by her former allies and Valeria and Kirby both rebuke her for thinking too emotionally. Alex and Feras both decline to play their idols, and by a unanimous vote, Kelli becomes the tenth person voted out of the game.
235	13	"Revenge Is a Dish Best Served Russian"	Days 26–27	25 February 2024
At the Titans camp, everyone celebrates Kelli's departure, feeling unified by the consensus vote. Kirby feels close with Valeria and hopes to continue working with her, but still does not trust Feras. Valeria wants revenge for Viola on her old allies on the other tribe, and hopes to hear Mark's side of the story. Before the next challenge, Jonathan informs players that the tribes have merged.: Reward/Immunity challenge: Players stand on a narrow beam balancing a ball on a wooden bow. At intervals, players must move to narrower sections of the beam, making it more difficult to balance. Last player standing wins $60,000, a mattress to sleep on for one night and a spectator role at the next tribal council.; Valeria wins reward. The merged tribe returns to their new camp and dubs themselves "Tasi". Caroline sees Feras as a big target and hopes to align players against him quickly, approaching Valeria about working together again. However, Mark tells Valeria and Winna the truth of Viola's blindside, and they plot to target either Caroline or Kitty next.: Immunity challenge: Players hold up a bar with their legs, balancing a ball in an overhead chute. Last player standing wins individual immunity.; Winna wins immunity after Jaden drops out for him. Back at camp, the old Titans plan a split vote between Feras and Raymond, while Kirby begins amassing votes against Kitty. Scott feels close with Kitty and informs her that her name has come up, and that he suspects Mark and Valeria are behind it. Kitty and Caroline confront the two about this; Valeria lies that Feras was behind the plan. Eden suggests they cancel the split vote plan and put all their votes on Raymond. At Tribal Council, Winna reflects on the amount of lies and agendas in the tribe and is happy to be safe tonight. Alex and Raymond comment on how difficult it is to craft a plan with so many variables in play. Kitty admits to hearing her name and vows to come after anyone who targets her. Scott is highly emotional about the tension in the tribe and doesn’t feel mentally well enough to play the game properly. Scott elects to leave the game, canceling the planned vote.
236	14	"A Line in the Sand"	Days 28–29	26 February 2024
Kitty regrets her aggressive behaviour at last night's tribal council, hoping to make amends with the tribe and lower her threat level. Others like Kirby and Mark notice how paranoid she and Caroline are acting, believing it puts a bigger target on their backs.: Immunity challenge: Players hold onto a rope over the ocean, balancing on a knot. At intervals, they must move up to stand on smaller knots, making it more difficult to balance. Last player standing wins immunity.; Rianna wins immunity. Kirby approaches Rianna about targeting Kitty, but Rianna feels close with Kitty and Caroline and considers joining them in voting for Mark. Valeria suggests switching the vote to Caroline to maintain an element of surprise. Kitty and Caroline approaches Feras with the possibility of voting out Winna to weaken Mark, which he strongly considers. They plan to keep Rianna out of the vote due Feras's distrust of her, and they tell Alex to vote for Valeria. At Tribal Council, Mark discusses how Scott's departure kept alliance lines obscured by canceling the vote. Eden likens the changing game to speed-dating as everyone has been forming new relationships very quickly. Caroline feels like nobody knows exactly where the vote will fall tonight, and Jaden believes trust will be broken tonight one way or another. Winna hopes that today's chaos will result in greater clarity about tribal dynamics. When the votes are read, Feras's alliance teamed up with the Middle Aged Mafia and Winna is blindsided in a 6–5–1–1 vote over Caroline, Mark and Valeria, respectively, and Winna becomes the eleventh person voted out.
237	15	"Master and Apprentice"	Days 30–31	27 February 2024
Caroline is grateful to Feras for saving her, and feels burned by both Mark and Valeria for turning on her. Eden hopes to take control of the tribe by reuniting the old Titans, approaching Jaden and Mark with the plan, but Mark worries that Kitty and Caroline won’t want to work with him again.: Reward challenge: Two teams of six rush to fill a bucket with water from the ocean to open a gate. First team to finish is divided into two teams of three, using monkey fists to raise flags. First team to finish competes in an individual puzzle; first player to solve the puzzle wins a barbecue reward and an Isuzu MU-X.; Mark wins reward, and chooses Kitty, Valeria and Caroline to accompany him to the barbecue. Back at camp, Eden is upset that he wasn’t chosen, and worries that it was a mistake to bring both Valeria and Caroline after the harsh words they exchanged at the last vote. Jaden is still upset that Winna was blindsided, and wants to start playing more aggressively and avenge his friend. Meanwhile at the barbecue, Mark implores the group to make amends and join forces moving forward, but Caroline feels deeply hurt by Valeria's comments at tribal council. Valeria apologises and the group pledges to start over, though Caroline is still unsure if she can trust Mark.: Immunity challenge: Players balance an idol on a pole. At intervals, they must add segments to the pole to make it longer, making it harder to balance the idol. Last player standing wins immunity.; Jaden wins immunity. Eden wants to target Raymond to weaken Feras' alliance, convincing Caroline and Kitty to turn on their old allies and solidify their new majority alliance. Eden lies to Rianna that she will receive votes tonight, causing her to consider playing her idol. Feras begins to suspect the Titans are conspiring against him and confronts Caroline and Kitty separately, but they don’t give anything away. At Tribal Council, Mark explains his decision to bring Caroline on the reward and try to make amends, and Caroline and Valeria discuss burying the hatchet. Kirby and Feras begins to suspect deception from the Titans and secretly spread a plan for the old Rebels to target Eden. Before the votes are read, Rianna plays her idol for herself, but she receives no votes. Eden and Raymond receive six votes each; on the re-vote, Jaden flips his vote, and Eden becomes the twelfth person voted out.
238	16	"The Wedge"	Days 32–33	3 March 2024
Feras and Aileen discuss whether to target Kitty and Caroline or bring them farther into the game as numbers. Feras approaches Caroline about forming a secret alliance, but has no intentions of honouring it in reality. Kirby hopes to take control for herself and doesn't want to be Feras' pawn, starting by eliminating Aileen to weaken his power.: Reward auction: Players are given $500 to bid on various food and luxury rewards.; During the auction, Raymond finds an advantage hidden within a bucket of popcorn he purchased, allowing his lone vote to send a person home at one of the next three tribal councils, but only if every other member of his tribe votes for him. He tells Feras about the advantage, but isn't sure how to pull it off. Kirby approaches Feras with a plan to split votes between Mark and Caroline, but in reality she plans to blindside Aileen. She approaches Kitty with this plan, but the Titans don't fully trust her and consider ratting her out to Feras instead.: Immunity challenge: Players use a rope to balance a small unstable platform, attempting to transfer eight blocks onto it one at a time. If any blocks fall over in the process, they must start over. First player to stack all eight blocks on the platform wins immunity.; Kitty wins immunity. Feras informs Caroline that her name will come up but that she isn't the target, instructing her to vote for Mark. Meanwhile, Kirby rallies votes against Aileen, but Caroline has second thoughts, unsure if she can trust Kirby. Feras suspects that Caroline and Kitty are lying to him, and cancels the split vote plan with his allies to solely target Mark. Alex worries that he will be targeted because of his idol and considers playing it. At Tribal Council, Kirby expresses doubt that the remaining Titans will last long in the game moving forward. Caroline feels vulnerable tonight, but Alex suspects that something could happen to shift the power structure of the tribe. Aileen reflects on the lack of idols played correctly this season, and contemplates whether one will be played tonight. Alex declines to play his idol, and when the votes are read, Aileen is blindsided in a 7-4 vote over Mark, becoming the first member of the jury.
239	17	"Floater or Flexible"	Days 34–35	4 March 2024
Kirby and Feras plan to work together now that Aileen is gone, and they agree to target Valeria next. Alex notices how close Kirby and Feras seem to be, and approaches the old Titans about forming a new alliance to counteract them. Kitty reconsiders her alliance with Caroline and contemplates flipping to Kirby's side to protect herself.: Immunity challenge: Players hang upside-down over water, holding onto a rope for balance. At intervals, they must move down lower on the rope, making it harder to hang on. Last player standing wins immunity.; Rianna wins immunity. Mark suggests that his alliance put their votes on Jaden in case Feras plays an idol, but Kitty leaks this plan to the other alliance. Jaden bickers with Caroline over the fire, causing her to suspect that somebody leaked the plan. Alex explains to Feras that he flipped sides because he felt left out of conversations, which irritates Feras and makes him consider switching the vote to Alex. Raymond contemplates making a big move for his resume and to potentially get use out of his advantage, approaching Alex about possibly working together. At Tribal Council, Kirby and Alex comment on how fluid the alliances are within the tribe. Alex butts heads with both Kirby and Feras over the difference between a "floater" and a "flexible" player. Mark whispers to Raymond about voting for Jaden, and Raymond whispers to Alex that Valeria is the target tonight. Kirby and Feras notice the whispering and secretly switch the vote to Alex at the last second. Before the votes are read, Alex plays his idol for Valeria, negating one vote against her. Jaden is voted out 5-4 over Alex after Raymond flips his vote and Rianna gets confused about the vote, and Jaden becomes the second member of the jury.
240	18	"The Best Actor Award"	Days 36–37	5 March 2024
Kitty apologises to her allies for flipping on them and hopes to work with them again, but Valeria and Mark no longer trust her. Raymond expresses his desire to break out from Feras' shadow and make moves of his own, hoping to trick his tribe mates into all voting for him so he can use his advantage. Feras knows about the advantage and plans to help him pull it off, but knows it can backfire easily.: Reward challenge: Players transfer coconuts through an obstacle course one at a time, then slingshot them at a board with plates bearing each player's name on it. Last player with their name left on the board wins a picnic of sandwiches and pastries.; Alex wins reward, and chooses to bring Valeria, Feras and Kitty with him to the picnic. Feras tells the group that Raymond is despondent about voting out Jaden and is close to quitting the game, hoping to help him pull off his advantage. Back at camp, the tribe discusses how withdrawn Raymond has become, and contemplate voting him out to honor his wishes. Raymond and Feras later tells Kirby about the advantage, and she agrees to help him pull it off, and they discuss using it to vote out Valeria. However, Valeria grows suspicious about a potential deception and considers using the opportunity to take a bigger threat out.: Immunity challenge: Players manoeuvre a ball through a multi-level table maze; if the ball drops at any time, they must start over from the beginning. First player to finish the maze wins immunity.; Kirby wins immunity. Raymond continues his charade of feeling down, and Feras suggests to the group that they set the game aside for one vote and honor his wish to go home. Valeria approaches Mark about possibly blindsiding Rianna, but Mark worries that they won’t be able to convince enough people to join them and that it will hurt their image with the jury. Kirby tells Rianna about Raymond's advantage to get her on board, but Rianna doesn’t trust Raymond and considers writing a different name down to protect herself. Kirby considers giving Rianna her own immunity necklace to make her feel safe tonight. At Tribal Council, Mark and Kitty discuss the shifting loyalties within the tribe and how many blindsides there have been. Feras suggests that tonight might be the first unanimous vote, and Raymond expresses his desire to go home. Caroline is worried about Raymond's well-being and plans to honour his wish to be voted out. Kirby gives Rianna her immunity necklace, explaining that she wants her to be safe "just in case". Feras hopes that no one will take advantage of this situation. Valeria remains suspicious of another blindside happening, believing the opportunity is ripe for something to happen. Before the votes are read, Raymond plays his advantage, nullifying all eight votes against him. Raymond's lone vote is cast for Valeria, making her the third member of the jury.
241	19	"How do Rainbows Work?"	Days 38–39	10 March 2024
Players compliment Raymond for his successful move at the last Tribal Council, with Feras pretending not to have known about the advantage. Alex and Mark lament losing their ally Valeria and approach Feras about forming a new alliance. Alex also approaches Kirby about possibly working together in the future, but she makes it clear that she doesn’t trust him.: Reward challenge: Players transport water from the ocean to a container using a leaky bucket. First player to fill their container wins an overnight trip to the Survivor Spa.; Alex wins reward, and chooses to bring Rianna, Caroline and Kirby with him. At the reward, Alex attempts to talk strategy with Kirby, but she still is unwilling to discuss game with him. The girls later feed Alex a fake plan of targeting Feras, but still plan to vote Alex out next. Back at camp, Mark is surprised by Alex's decisions on who to take, but hopes to bond with Feras and Raymond. They discuss who to target next and settle on Rianna to weaken Kirby's influence.: Immunity challenge: Players stand on narrow pegs over water, holding onto rungs attached to sandbags. Last player standing wins immunity.; Rianna wins immunity. Alex regrets taking her on the reward, and plots with the men to vote out Kirby. The girls plan to target Alex, and Kirby approaches Feras about joining them, but Feras secretly plans to work against her. Alex and Mark approach Caroline about flipping and targeting Kirby, but Alex worries that she’ll leak the plan to Kitty and ruin the plan. At Tribal Council, Alex discusses his decision to bring the three girls on reward, hoping to get closer to them but failing. He confronts Feras about sticking to his vote on Kirby, causing Feras to grow irritated. Alex attempts to paint Kirby as the biggest threat and implores others to make a big move and take her out. Kirby calls Alex a "floater" and reprimands him for insulting everyone else on the tribe. When the votes are read, Feras and Raymond side with the girls, and Alex is voted out 6–2 over Kirby, becoming the fourth member of the jury.
242	20	"Pride & Paranoia"	Days 40–41	11 March 2024
Kirby is concerned about her threat level after Alex's comments at the last tribal council, and talks with Caroline about voting out Mark next. Kirby tells Feras that she wants to sit next to him at the end, wanting to beat the best to win. Feras approaches Raymond about joining her to vote out Mark, but Raymond is adamant about getting Kirby out first. Feras deduces that there may be an all-girls alliance and lies to Caroline that Kirby wants her out after Mark, making her more suspicious. Kirby realises that she's in trouble and tells Feras that she is willing to sacrifice Rianna to save herself.: Immunity challenge: Players stack blocks upright in a row while holding up a heavy weight. If the weight drops, it will knock over the blocks, forcing them to start over. First player to line up all their blocks and knock them all over in a single domino chain wins immunity.; Kirby wins immunity. Kirby regrets the deal she made with Feras and attempts to talk him out of voting out Rianna, but he still wants her out. Rianna suspects that she is on the chopping block and that Caroline is lying to her. Caroline is unsure if she wants to go along with the Rianna plan, or to vote out Mark and claim the move as her own. At Tribal Council, Feras and Caroline reflect on the impact of Alex's words at the last vote, causing many to reflect on their own game. Kirby admits that she was nervous being painted as such a big threat. Rianna knows she is in trouble tonight but hopes that people will consider more than physical prowess as a threat. Kirby says she wants to take strong players to the end, and Mark suggests that everyone here has played a strong game and shouldn’t be underestimated. When the votes are read, Rianna is voted out 5–2 over Mark, making her the fifth member of the jury.
243	21	"How to Build A Resume"	Day 42	12 March 2024
Mark celebrates Rianna's departure and believes Kirby remains everyone's biggest target in the tribe. Kirby feels betrayed by Kitty and Caroline and hopes to target one of them next. Everyone begins hunting for an immunity idol, and Caroline finds it first, deciding to keep it a secret.: Immunity challenge: Players transport blocks across a trip obstacle using a long pole and stack them atop a platform. If they bump the obstacle, the stack will fall, forcing them to start over. First player to stack all their blocks wins immunity.; Kirby wins immunity. Feras and Kirby discuss whether to target Mark or Kitty tonight; Feras sees Mark as a bigger jury threat but Kirby sees Kitty as a challenge threat. Caroline approaches Kirby and Feras about voting out Mark, but secretly plans to play her idol for Mark and blindside Feras. Mark agrees to vote for Kitty to save himself, but later considers voting for Feras when Caroline tells him he will be receiving votes. At Tribal Council, Kirby discusses her confidence in recent challenges, while Caroline warns about the dangers of over-confidence. Feras does not feel confident that he has all the information about what will happen tonight. Kitty points out Kirby's huge resume in the game and Raymond believes the recent immunity wins puts a bigger target on her back. Mark expects to see his name at least once tonight. Before the votes are read, Caroline plays her idol for Mark, but only one vote is negated. Kitty is voted out 4–1 over Feras, becoming the sixth member of the jury.
244	22	"Dilemmas of the End"	Days 43–44	17 March 2024
Feras tells Kirby and Raymond about his idol and they vow to go to the final three together. Caroline and Mark worry about the Rebels staying loyal to one another and begin searching the island for idols. Feras hatches a plan to give his idol to Raymond and have him pretend to find it, which succeeds in causing Mark and Caroline to give up the search.: Immunity challenge: Players climb a ladder to drop a ball into a track, then run to the bottom of the track to catch it before it hits the ground. At intervals, they must add more balls to the track, until as many as five balls are in the track at one time. Last player to drop a ball wins immunity.; Mark wins immunity. Feras debates whether to target Caroline or Kirby tonight, and Mark suggests the latter, arguing the jury would view him as weak for failing to take her out. Feras worries that he would be losing an easy path to the final three by taking out Kirby, who he believes would take him to the end. Kirby suspects that Raymond might flip on her, and asks Feras if he would consider playing his idol to save her. Feras makes separate final three deals with Mark and Caroline, but isn’t sure if he can trust either of them. At Tribal Council, Mark expresses his relief for winning immunity, while Feras laments his failure to beat him. Mark believes Caroline is on the chopping block since she's one of the few players without immunity or an idol. Feras implies that Kirby has been a shield for him, while Mark and Caroline point out that waiting too long to take out a shield can backfire. Feras claims he isn’t afraid to sit next to Kirby at the end, feeling confident in his own game. Before the votes are read, Feras plays his idol for himself, explaining his ploy with Raymond the day before and his decision to not save Kirby with it. Kirby is voted out 4–1 over Caroline, becoming the seventh member of the jury.
245	23	"A Nation of One"	Day 45	18 March 2024
Mark and Caroline reflect on their final three deals with Feras the day before but worry he won’t uphold it, and consider voting him out next. Feras and Raymond pledge to stay loyal to one another until the final two. However, Feras sees Mark as his biggest threat in the game, and he strikes a deal with Caroline to vote out Raymond if Mark wins immunity.: Immunity challenge: Players navigate an obstacle course, collecting balls along the way. They must then shoot their balls into a narrow goal. First player to score all their balls wins immunity.; Mark wins immunity. Feras is devastated by the loss and feels like he’s taking up a more deserving player’s slot in the game. Caroline tells Mark about the separate deal Feras struck with her earlier, causing Mark to distrust Feras. Caroline promises Feras that she’ll uphold their previous deal, but Feras worries that it is a ploy to blindside him by splitting his vote from Raymond’s. At Tribal Council, Mark reflects on the Titans v. Rebels theme and how it has shaped the post-merge. Feras reflects on his tight bond with Raymond, but Mark exposes the deals Feras has made with him and Caroline, calling his loyalty into question. Feras admits regret about not saving Kirby, which surprises Caroline. Raymond calls out Mark for playing to the jury, but Mark believes it is fair game to bring up. When the votes are read, Raymond and Caroline receive two votes apiece, forcing a fire-making tiebreaker. Caroline’s fire burns through the rope first, and Raymond becomes the eighth member of the jury.
246	24	"The Fire That I Can Bring"	Days 46–47	19 March 2024
Feras reflects on his failure to win individual immunity thus far in the game, and vows to beat Mark in today’s challenge. Mark celebrates his dominance of the late game and is confident about his chances at winning immunity. Caroline feels underestimated but is comfortable with the moves she made, and hopes either she or Mark wins today to vote out Feras. The players are greeted by their loved ones before beginning their final immunity challenge.: Immunity challenge: Players balance on narrow pegs on a giant wheel. At intervals the wheel rotates, forcing them to stand on narrower pegs. Last player left standing wins immunity.; Feras wins immunity. At Tribal Council, Feras is relieved that he is safe tonight, but knows he has a big decision ahead of him. Caroline and Mark each plead their case for Feras to take him, with Caroline seeing herself as a worthy competitor and Mark suggesting that Caroline will be dangerous to sit against at the end. Feras casts his lone vote for Mark, making him the ninth and final member of the jury. Caroline and Feras enjoy a breakfast feast and reflect on their respective journeys before arriving at Final Tribal Council. Caroline describes her moves throughout the game, her loyalty to her allies, and her fire-making challenge win. Feras explains his desire to represent his values and culture while having fun, and how he navigated the tribe swap and made big, risky moves post-merge. The jury grills Feras on his idol misplays throughout the game, and Caroline for lying for little gain and failing to make any big moves. Caroline explains her idol play on Mark as her big move, but is criticized for it failing to work. Feras tells Kirby why he chose not to save her with his idol and why he held onto it for so long, using it for deceptive purposes to keep himself safe. When the votes are read, the jury votes 9-0 in Feras’s favor, awarding him $500,000 and the title of Sole Survivor.

== Voting history ==
Tribal Phase (Day 1–25)

	Original Tribes						Switched Tribes							Post-Swap Tribes
Episode #	1	2	3	4	5	6	7	8	9	10		11		12
Day #	2	5	7	9	12	14	16	18	20	21		23		25
Eliminated	Frankie	Jessica	Peta	Tobias	Kelli (Note: Jonathan informed the Rebels at Tribal Council of Day 12 that instead of voting someone out, they would vote someone to join the Titans tribe as a Saboteur. If the Saboteur makes the Titans lose the next immunity challenge, they will return to the Rebels tribe. If the Saboteur fails to sabotage the Titans, the Saboteur will remain on Titans. Kelli was voted to go to the Titans tribe and the Titans tribe subsequently lost the next Immunity Challenge, thus Kelli returned to the Rebels Tribe before the vote commenced at Tribal Council.)	Nathan	Viola	Sarah	Garrick	Tie (Note: The Tribal Council vote resulted in a tie. Per the rules, a second vote was held where the castaways involved in the tie would not vote and the remaining castaways could only vote for those who tied.)	Charles	Rianna & Alex (Note: Jonathan informed the Rebels at Tribal Council of Day 23 that instead of voting someone out, everyone who received votes would then draw rocks to determine who would be swapped to the Titans tribe. The person who drew the blue rock would be swapped to the Titans tribe.)	Alex	Kelli
Votes	8–4	6–4–1	6–3–3	5–3–0 (Note: Feras played a hidden immunity idol on himself; therefore three votes against him were negated.)	9–1	6–3–1	6–2–1	4–3–0 (Note: Mark played a hidden immunity idol on himself; therefore one vote against him was negated.)	6–3–1	1–1–0 (Note: Aileen, Feras and Kirby were the only castaways eligible to vote after winning a special individual challenge at tribal council, for the right to vote and immunity.) (Note: Winna played a hidden immunity idol on himself; therefore one vote against him was negated.)	2–1	4–3	Rock Draw	8–1
Voter	Vote													
Feras			Peta	Tobias	Kelli				Kirby	~~Winna~~	Charles			Kelli
Caroline	Frankie	Nathan				Nathan	Viola	Sarah				Alex	Immune	
Mark	Frankie	Jessica				Nathan	Sarah	Caroline				Rianna	Immune	
Raymond			Peta	Tobias	Kelli				Kirby	None (Note: This castaway was ineligible to vote after losing a special individual immunity and right to vote challenge.)				Kelli
Kirby			Kelli	Alex	Kelli				Garrick	Raymond	Raymond			Kelli
Kitty	Frankie	Nathan				Jaden	Viola	Sarah				Rianna	Immune	
Rianna			Raymond	Alex	Kelli		Viola	~~Mark~~				Alex	Pink Rock	
Alex			Kelli	~~Feras~~	Kelli		Rianna	Caroline				Rianna	Blue Rock	Kelli
Valeria	Frankie	Jessica				Nathan			Garrick	None				Kelli
Jaden	Jessica	Jessica				Nathan	Viola	Sarah				Alex	Immune	
Aileen			Peta	Alex	Kelli				Kelli	Charles	Charles			Kelli
Eden	Frankie	Nathan				Jaden	Viola	Sarah				Rianna	Immune	
Winna	Jessica	Nathan				Nathan			Garrick	None				Kelli
Scott			Peta	Tobias	Kelli				Garrick	None				Kelli
Kelli			Peta	Tobias	Raymond				Garrick	None				Winna
Charles	Frankie	Jessica				Nathan			Garrick	None				
Garrick			Peta	Tobias	Kelli				Kirby					
Sarah			Raymond	~~Feras~~	Kelli		Viola	Caroline						
Viola	Frankie	Jessica				Jaden	Rianna							
Nathan	Jessica	Jessica				Caroline								
Tobias			Kelli	~~Feras~~										
Peta			Raymond											
Jessica	Frankie	Eden												
Frankie	Jessica													

Individual phase (Day 26–47)

	Merged tribe													
Episode #	13	14	15		16	17	18	19	20	21	22	23		24
Day #	27	29	31		33	35	37	39	41	42	44	45		46
Eliminated	Scott	Winna	Tie	Eden	Aileen	Jaden	Valeria	Alex	Rianna	Kitty	Kirby	Tie (Note: The Tribal Council vote resulted in a tie. Per the rules, the two tied contestants faced off in a fire-making challenge, with the first contestant to do so advancing to the Final 3.)	Raymond	Mark
Votes	Quit (Note: Scott quit the game for concerns of his mental health, cancelling that night's vote.)	6–5–1–1	6–6 (Note: Rianna played a hidden immunity idol on herself; however no votes were cast against her.)	6–4	7–4	5–4–0 (Note: Alex played a hidden immunity idol on Valeria; therefore one vote against her was negated.)	1–0 (Note: Raymond played an ultimate vote advantage that nullified all votes cast against him, so long as the vote was unanimous against him - making Raymond's vote the only valid vote. As the vote was unanimous against Raymond, the eight votes against him were negated.)	6–2	5–2	4–1–0 (Note: Caroline played a hidden immunity idol on Mark; therefore one vote against him was negated.)	4–1	2–2	Challenge	1–0
Voter	Vote													
Feras		Winna	Eden	Eden	Mark	Alex	~~Raymond~~	Alex	Rianna	Kitty	Kirby	Caroline		Mark
Caroline		Winna	Raymond	Raymond	Aileen	Jaden	~~Raymond~~	Alex	Rianna	Feras	Kirby	Raymond	Won	None (Note: This contestant was only able to vote for one other contestant, thus they were not eligible to vote.)
Mark		Caroline	Raymond	Raymond	Aileen	Jaden	~~Raymond~~	Kirby	Rianna	Kitty	Kirby	Raymond		None
Raymond		Winna	Eden	None (Note: Eden and Raymond were ineligible to vote in the revote.)	Mark	Jaden	Valeria	Alex	Rianna	Kitty	Kirby	Caroline	Lost	
Kirby		Caroline	Eden	Eden	Aileen	Alex	~~Raymond~~	Alex	Mark	Kitty	Caroline			
Kitty		Winna	Raymond	Raymond	Aileen	Alex	~~Raymond~~	Alex	Rianna	~~Mark~~				
Rianna		Mark	Eden	Eden	Aileen	~~Valeria~~	~~Raymond~~	Alex	Mark					
Alex		Valeria	Eden	Eden	Mark	Jaden	~~Raymond~~	Kirby						
Valeria	Immune (Note: Valeria won immunity by winning Day 26's Reward Challenge. Part of the rewards allowed Valeria to attend Tribal Council as a spectator with no risk of being voted off but with no vote to cast.)	Caroline	Raymond	Raymond	Aileen	Jaden	~~Raymond~~							
Jaden		Caroline	Raymond	Eden	Aileen	Alex								
Aileen		Winna	Eden	Eden	Mark									
Eden		Winna	Raymond	None										
Winna		Caroline												
Scott														

Final vote
Episode #	24	
Day #	47	
Finalist	Feras	Caroline
Vote	9–0	
Juror	Vote	
Mark	Feras	
Raymond	Feras	
Kirby	Feras	
Kitty	Feras	
Rianna	Feras	
Alex	Feras	
Valeria	Feras	
Jaden	Feras	
Aileen	Feras	

== Reception ==
=== Ratings ===
On 28 January 2024, OzTAM's ratings data recording system changed. Viewership data will now focus on National Reach (viewed for more than one minute) and National Total ratings (average viewership) instead of providing data on the 5 metro centres and overnight shares.

Wk	Episode		Airdate	Timeslot	Overnight			7 Day Timeshift			Source
Wk	Episode		Airdate	Timeslot	Reach viewers	Total viewers	Rank	Reach viewers	Total viewers	Rank	Source
1	1	"We've All Seen This Movie"	29 January 2024	Monday 7:30 pm	1,126,000	572,000	13	1,537,000	857,000	8	
1	2	"The Invisible Hand"	30 January 2024	Tuesday 7:30 pm	1,044,000	578,000	12	1,399,000	843,000	6	
1	3	"The Cuddle Club"	31 January 2024	Wednesday 7:30 pm	1,017,000	524,000	14	1,387,000	785,000	7	
2	4	"B is for Blindside"	4 February 2024	Sunday 7:30 pm	1,081,000	553,000	9	1,326,000	779,000	7	
2	5	"Where Angels Fear to Tread"	5 February 2024	Monday 7:30 pm	1,055,000	590,000	14	1,334,000	815,000	11	
2	6	"The Saboteur"	6 February 2024	Tuesday 7:30 pm	1,051,000	553,000	12	1,381,000	798,000	7	
3	7	"Get, Or Get Got"	11 February 2024	Sunday 7:30 pm	1,098,000	577,000	9	1,403,000	801,000	6	
3	8	"The Divorce"	12 February 2024	Monday 7:30 pm	1,018,000	569,000	16	1,304,000	780,000	12	
3	9	"Excited For The Actions"	13 February 2024	Tuesday 7:30 pm	1,035,000	532,000	12	1,348,000	761,000	7	
4	10	"Bad Hair Day"	18 February 2024	Sunday 7:30 pm	1,137,000	612,000	10	1,380,000	834,000	6	
4	11	"It's Not Sarong, It's So Right"	19 February 2024	Monday 7:30 pm	917,000	560,000	17	1,174,000	766,000	14	
4	12	"To Infinity And Beyond"	20 February 2024	Tuesday 7:30 pm	1,022,000	522,000	12	1,229,000	743,000	9	
5	13	"Revenge Is a Dish Best Served Russian"	25 February 2024	Sunday 7:30 pm	1,078,000	563,000	10	1,332,000	754,000	7	
5	14	"A Line in the Sand"	26 February 2024	Monday 7:30 pm	1,072,000	577,000	13	1,229,000	784,000	9	
5	15	"Master and Apprentice"	27 February 2024	Tuesday 7:30 pm	1,109,000	577,000	12	1,380,000	780,000	8	
6	16	"The Wedge"	3 March 2024	Sunday 7:30 pm	1,089,000	615,000	10	1,333,000	804,000	8	
6	17	"Floater or Flexible"	4 March 2024	Monday 7:30 pm	1,024,000	598,000	15	1,290,000	802,000	10	
6	18	"The Best Actor Award"	5 March 2024	Tuesday 7:30 pm	1,074,000	571,000	13	1,347,000	790,000	8	
7	19	"How do Rainbows Work?"	10 March 2024	Sunday 7:30 pm	1,061,000	595,000	8	1,371,000	827,000	6	
7	20	"Pride & Paranoia"	11 March 2024	Monday 7:30 pm	991,000	595,000	16	1,291,000	797,000	12	
7	21	"How to Build a Resume"	12 March 2024	Tuesday 7:30 pm	1,096,000	603,000	12	1,347,000	790,000	8	
8	22	"Dilemmas of the End"	17 March 2024	Sunday 7:30 pm	993,000	601,000	9	1,237,000	773,000	7	
8	23	"A Nation of One"	18 March 2024	Monday 7:30 pm	1,098,000	670,000	12	1,300,000	818,000	8	
8	24	"The Fire That I Can Bring"	19 March 2024	Tuesday 7:30 pm	1,201,000	706,000	8	1,437,000	877,000	6	
