= Nathan Freeman =

Australian rules footballer

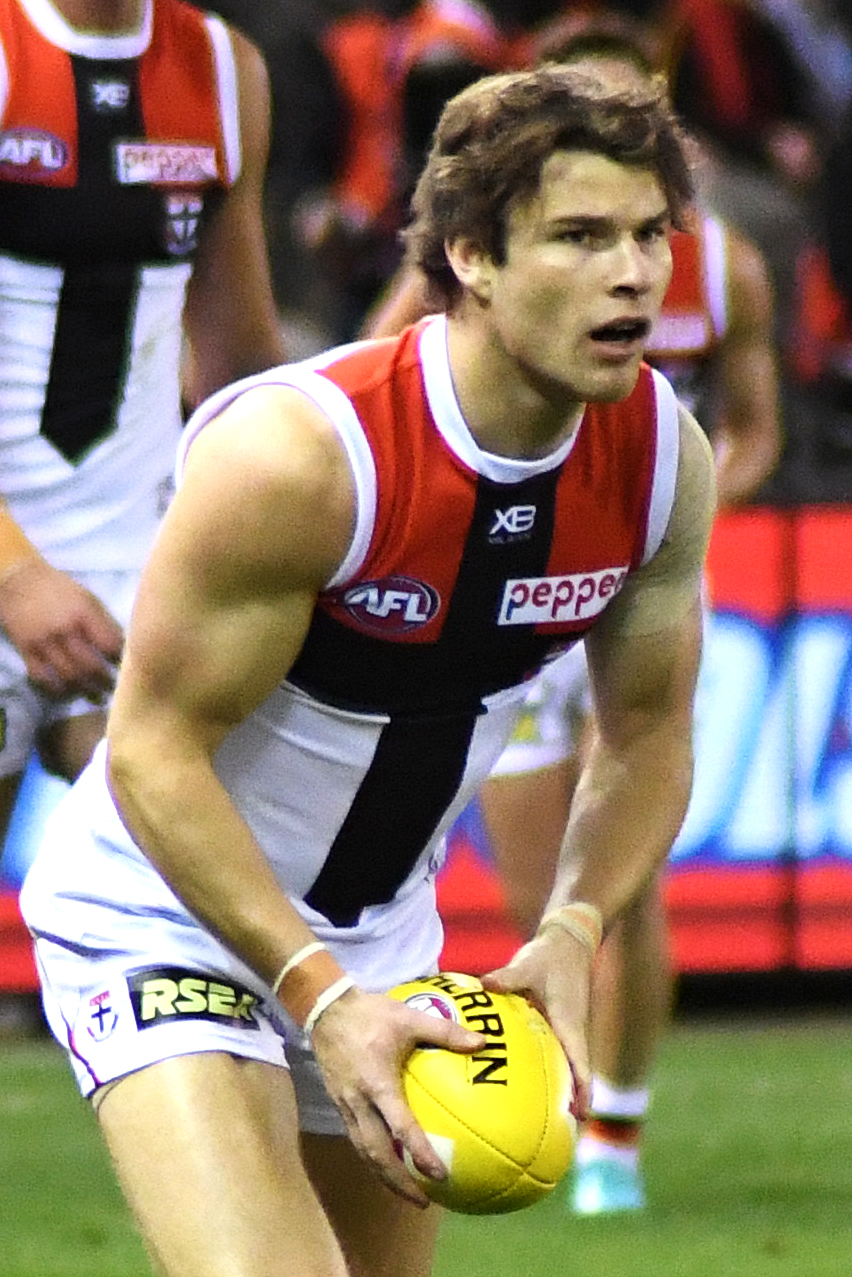
- Freeman playing for St Kilda in August 2018

Personal information
- Full name: Nathan Freeman
- Born: 16 June 1995 (age 31)
- Original team: Sandringham Dragons (TAC Cup)
- Draft: No. 10, 2013 national draft
- Height: 183 cm (6 ft 0 in)
- Weight: 88 kg (194 lb)
- Position: Midfielder

Playing career^{1}
Years	Club	Games (Goals)
2014–2015	Collingwood	0 (0)
2016–2018	St Kilda	2 (1)
- ^{1} Playing statistics correct to the end of 2018.

Nathan Freeman (born 16 June 1995) is an Australian rules footballer who played for the St Kilda Football Club in the Australian Football League. He was drafted by Collingwood at pick 10 in the 2013 AFL national draft. He was then traded to the Saints in 2015 without having played an AFL game due to repeated injuries. Freeman was delisted at the end of the 2018 season having made his senior debut only weeks earlier against the Western Bulldogs in Round 20. Freeman is currently playing for the SANFL Crows in the South Australian Football League. Freeman previously played for the Frankston Football Club in the Victorian Football League. In 2023, Freeman competed on the 11th season of Survivor Australia, placing 20th.
