= Australian Survivor: Brains V Brawn II =

Australian reality show

- Season 12
- Presented by: Jonathan LaPaglia
- No. of days: 47
- No. of castaways: 24
- Winner: Myles Kuah
- Runner-up: Kaelan Lockhart
- Location: Upolu, Samoa
- No. of episodes: 24

Release
- Original network: Network 10
- Original release: 17 February – 14 April 2025

Additional information
- Filming dates: 29 July – 13 September 2024

Season chronology
- ← Previous; Titans V Rebels Next → Australia V The World

Australian Survivor: Brains V Brawn II is the twelfth season of Australian Survivor, which premiered on Network 10 on 17 February 2025 and is based on the international reality competition franchise Survivor.

In this season, twenty-four contestants were stranded in Samoa and divided into two tribes: "Brains" and "Brawn", similar to the format of the eighth season. Myles Kuah was named the winner of the season, defeating Kaelan Lockhart in a 7–1 vote.

== Production ==
On 17 May 2024, Daniel Monaghan, Paramount Australia and New Zealand's senior vice president of content and programming, confirmed that Australian Survivor would start filming the next season, with the theme Brains vs Brawn, in July.

== Contestants ==
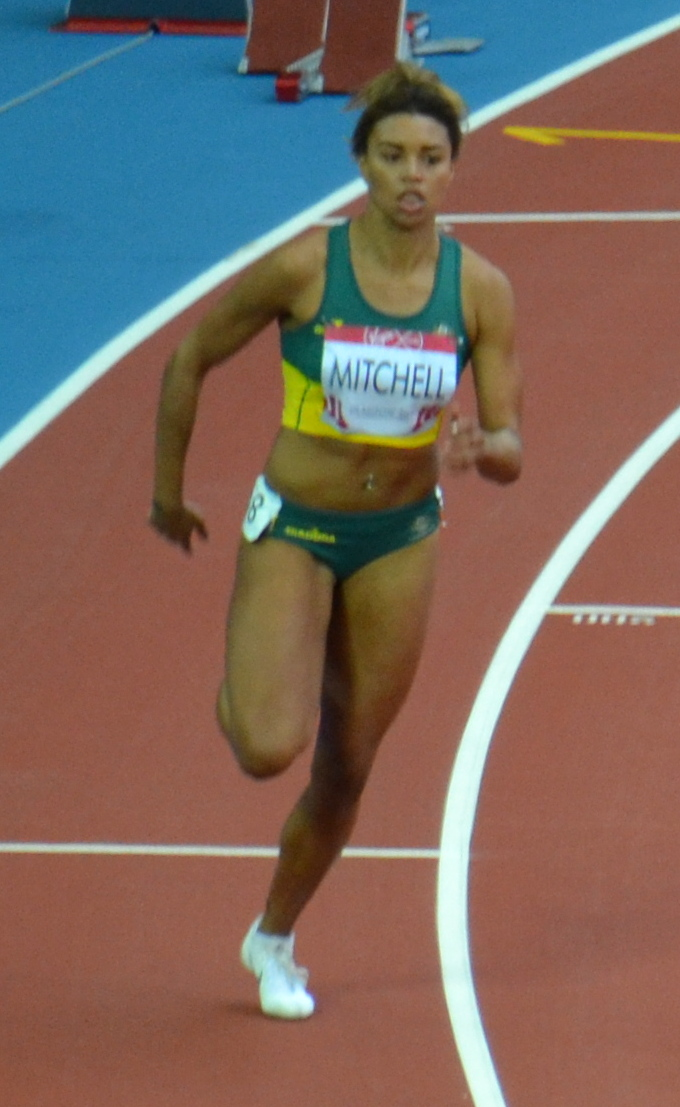
Morgan Mitchell

The 24 contestants are divided into two tribes based on their intellect or strength. The cast includes Logan Johannisen, the wife of Jason Johannisen, Olympian Morgan Mitchell and former Ambulance Australia paramedic Paulie Michael.

Contestant	Original tribe	Post-Swap tribe	Shuffled tribe	Post shuffled tribe	Merged tribe	Finish
Candice "Candy" Rule; 26, Sydney, NSW	Brawn					1st voted out Day 2
Indy Saleh; 45, Townsville, QLD	Brains					2nd voted out Day 5
Zen Heaton; 21, Gold Coast, QLD	Brawn					Medically evacuated Day 7
Kent Miller-Randle; 54, Melbourne, VIC	Brains					3rd voted out Day 7
Nash Gendo; 36, Sydney, NSW	Brawn					4th voted out Day 9
Ally Kettle; 31, Goovigen, QLD	Brains	Brains				5th voted out Day 14
Richard "Rich" Hughes; 38, Melbourne, VIC	Brains	Brawn	Brawn			6th voted out Day 16
Ursula Rose; 35, Canberra, ACT	Brawn	Brawn	Brawn			7th voted out Day 18
Max Wills; 28, Gold Coast, QLD	Brains	Brains	Brains			8th voted out Day 19
Laura Noonan; 27, Melbourne, VIC	Brawn	Brawn	Brawn			9th voted out Day 21
Ben Bylett; 45, Mount Coolum, QLD	Brawn	Brawn	Brains	Brains		Left (Note: Ben left the game for undisclosed reasons.); Day 25
Jesse Noonan; 33, Gold Coast, QLD	Brawn	Brawn	Brains	Brains	Malosi	10th voted out Day 28
Paul "PD" Dee; 49, Rockdale, NSW	Brawn	Brawn	Brains	Brains	Malosi	11th voted out Day 29
Laura Darras; 25, Melbourne, VIC	Brains	Brains	Brains	Brains	Malosi	12th voted out 1st jury member Day 31
Paul "Paulie" Michael; 36, Sydney, NSW	Brawn	Brawn	Brawn	Brawn	Malosi	13th voted out 2nd jury member Day 35
Karin Gunatilake; 30, Melbourne, VIC	Brains	Brains	Brawn	Brawn	Malosi	14th voted out 3rd jury member Day 37
Logan Johannisen; 27, Melbourne, VIC	Brains	Brains	Brawn	Brawn	Malosi	15th voted out 4th jury member Day 39
Kristin Alston; 43, Sydney, NSW	Brawn	Brawn	Brawn	Brawn	Malosi	16th voted out 5th jury member Day 41
Morgan Mitchell; 29, Melbourne, VIC	Brawn	Brawn	Brains	Brains	Malosi	17th voted out (Note: Morgan declined to join the jury following her elimination.); Day 43
Kate Gloufchis; 26, Melbourne, VIC	Brawn	Brawn	Brains	Brains	Malosi	18th voted out 6th jury member Day 44
Zara Callianiotis; 43, Brisbane, QLD	Brains	Brains	Brains	Brawn	Malosi	19th voted out 7th jury member Day 45
Alexander "AJ" Antonios; 35, Sydney, NSW	Brains	Brains	Brawn	Brawn	Malosi	20th voted out 8th jury member Day 46
Kaelan Lockhart; 27, Brisbane, QLD	Brains	Brains	Brawn	Brawn	Malosi	Runner-up; Day 47
Myles Kuah; 23, Sydney, NSW	Brains	Brains	Brains	Brains	Malosi	Sole Survivor; Day 47

=== Future appearances ===
In 2026, AJ competed on the third season of The Traitors.

== Season summary ==
Twenty-four new contestants were divided into two tribes: "Brains", known for their intellect, and "Brawn", known for their strength.

Challenge winners and eliminations by episode

Tribal phase (Days 1–25)
Episode			Challenge winner(s)		Eliminated	Finish
No.	Title	Original air date	Reward	Immunity	Eliminated	Finish
1	"Premiere"	17 February 2025	Brawn	Brains	Candy	1st voted out Day 2
2	"The Praying Mantis"	18 February 2025	Brains	Brawn	Indy	2nd voted out Day 5
3	"Stoic"	19 February 2025	Brawn	Brawn	Zen	Medically evacuated Day 7
3	"Stoic"	19 February 2025	Brawn	Brawn	Kent	3rd voted out Day 7
4	"Perplexed Dimension"	23 February 2025	Brains	Brains	Nash	4th voted out Day 9
5	"Bomb Squad!"	24 February 2025	Brawn	Brawn	No elimination on Day 12 due to a tribe swap vote. (Note: Jonathan informed the Brains at Tribal Council of Day 12 that instead of voting someone out, they would vote someone to join the Brawn tribe and gain an advantage. Rich was voted to go to the Brawn tribe and it was revealed that his advantage, which had to be played at the next tribal council regardless of which tribe was voting, would allow the holder to force two people to leave tribal council prior to casting of votes.)	
5	"Bomb Squad!"	24 February 2025	[Ally] (Note: The Brawn tribe were told to invite a castaway from the Brains on their reward; they chose Ally.)	Brawn	No elimination on Day 12 due to a tribe swap vote.	
6	"The Pest Problem"	25 February 2025	Brawn	Brawn	Ally	5th voted out Day 14
7	"A Date with JLP"	2 March 2025	Brawn	Brains	Rich	6th voted out Day 16
8	"Maggot in the Rice"	3 March 2025	None	Brains	Ursula	7th voted out Day 18
9	"Hostages"	4 March 2025	None	Brawn	Max	8th voted out Day 19
10	"The Vault"	9 March 2025	Brains	Brains	Noonan	9th voted out Day 21
11	"The Strong-Arm"	10 March 2025	None	Brawn	No elimination on Day 23 due to a tribe swap vote. (Note: Jonathan informed the Brains at Tribal Council of Day 23 that instead of voting someone out, they would vote someone to join the Brawn tribe. Zara was voted to go to the Brawn tribe.)	
12	"Just What the Doctor Ordered"	11 March 2025	Brains	Brains	Ben	Left (Note: Ben left the game for undisclosed reasons, this cancelled the planned Brawn Tribal Council.); Day 25

Merge phase (Days 26–47)
Episode			Challenge winner(s)		Eliminated	Finish
No.	Title	Original air date	Reward	Immunity	Eliminated	Finish
13	"Vengeance"	16 March 2025	Kate [AJ, Kristin, Logan, Morgan, Paulie, Zara]	Logan	Jesse	10th voted out Day 28
14	"The Buddy System"	17 March 2025	None	Kaelan	PD	11th voted out Day 29
15	"The Rat King"	18 March 2025	AJ, Karin, Kate, Kristin, Myles, Paulie	Kaelan	Laura	12th voted out 1st jury member Day 31
16	"Pickled"	23 March 2025	Survivor; Auction	Kate [Morgan] (Note: As part of the tribe split twist, Immunity Winner Kate was immune to being voted on the Barren Tribe and could choose a tribemate to join her, she chose Morgan.)	No elimination on Day 33 due to a Malosi tribe split vote. (Note: Jonathan informed the Malosi tribe at Tribal Council of Day 33 that instead of voting someone out, they would temporarily split into two tribes, Bounty (who would stay on the Malosi tribe beach and be given a breakfast every morning of the split) and Barren (who would move to a new beach with nothing). First, immunity winner Kate would automatically go to Bounty, along with someone of her choice; she chose Morgan. Then, the tribe voted for two castaways to be sent to the Barren tribe. The tribe voted for Paulie & Logan. Finally, the remaining 6 drew rocks to assign their tribes. The Barren tribe consists of Kaelan, Kristin, Logan, Myles and Paulie. The Bounty tribe consists of AJ, Karin, Kate, Morgan and Zara.)	
17	"G-R-I-M"	24 March 2025	None (Note: No Reward Challenge, but the Bounty tribe were given a breakfast for the two Days of the Bounty & Barren twist.)	Kate, Zara [AJ, Morgan & Karin] (Note: As part of the Bounty & Barren twist, the last player standing would win immunity for their tribe. As Kate & Zara outlasted the Barren tribe, they won the immunity challenge, with immunity also given to their tribemates AJ, Morgan & Karin.)	Paulie	13th voted out 2nd jury member Day 35
18	"Operation: Shut; Your Pie Hole"	25 March 2025	AJ, Kristin [Kaelan, Logan]	Kaelan	Karin	14th voted out 3rd jury member Day 37
19	"The Magic Number"	30 March 2025	Kristin [Logan, Morgan]	Kaelan	Logan	15th voted out 4th jury member Day 39
20	"The Reaper is Coming"	31 March 2025	None	Kaelan	Kristin	16th voted out 5th jury member Day 41
21	"House of Cards"	6 April 2025	None	Kaelan	Morgan	17th voted out (Note: Morgan declined to join the jury following her elimination.); Day 43
21	"House of Cards"	6 April 2025	None	Kate (Note: At Day 43's Tribal Council, a Special Second Individual Immunity Challenge which everyone except Kaelan contested. Kate won this challenge)	Morgan	17th voted out Day 43
22	"Polarising the Outcome"	7 April 2025	None	Zara	Kate	18th voted out 6th jury member Day 44
23	"Fired Up!"	13 April 2025	None	Myles	Zara	19th voted out 7th jury member Day 45
24	"Go With Your Heart"	14 April 2025	None	Kaelan	AJ	20th voted out 8th jury member Day 46
24	"Go With Your Heart"	14 April 2025			Final vote	
24	"Go With Your Heart"	14 April 2025			Kaelan	Runner-up; Day 47
24	"Go With Your Heart"	14 April 2025			Myles	Sole Survivor; Day 47

== Episodes ==
No. overall	No. in season	Title	Timeline	Original release date
247	1	"Premiere"	Days 1–2	17 February 2025
This season, 12 intelligent Brains take on 12 strong Brawn for an epic rematch of the initial Brains V Brawn eighth season. Both tribes began the game with their fires already lit at camp. However, they did not start with flint. The tribes immediately competed in their first reward challenge when they met.: Reward challenge: Players race to retrieve a key from the top of a high pole. They first must transfer a pile of sandbags to stack and reach the key. They only have palm leaves and rope to tie them together. The first team to retrieve their key wins flint to bring back to camp and the ultimate construction kit. (Saw, axe, hammer, nails, machete, rope, hammock, tarp and bananas); Brawn win reward and return to camp to introduce themselves. Nash takes charge of getting the tribe to start constructing a shelter. Ben and Jesse initiate building while the others are mainly socializing. Nash immediately finds the first immunity idol of the season. He returns to camp flaunting his necklace for the whole tribe to see, immediately creating chatter and division around camp. At the Brains beach, begin introducing themselves and discuss how to move on from their loss at the first reward challenge. Laura, Logan, Zara, and Karin click and create the first alliance of the season, calling themselves "The Coven." Kent takes charge of building the shelter and creates tension amongst the rest of the Brains tribe. During the first night, he secretly throws Max's cowboy hat into the fire.: Immunity challenge: Each tribe works together to carry a heavy-filled coconut snake out of a cage, under a net, and up to a high tower. They then must use the coconuts to fill a drum, releasing a gate. Two tribe mates finish the challenge by completing a puzzle. The first team to complete their puzzle wins immunity.; Brains win immunity. Nash is immediately targeted for his performance during the puzzle portion of the immunity challenge. Nash pulls in PD, Ursula, and Kristin to target Candy. A group forms to still target Nash even though he has his immunity idol. A plan is formed to split votes between Nash, Candy, and Ursula. At Tribal Council, Nash's immunity idol is the main point of discussion. Most players call it arrogant, pointless, and a dumb move on his part. Candy and Ursula voice reasons to keep them in the game for challenge strengths. Before the votes are read, Nash plays his hidden immunity idol for himself, negating three votes against him. Candy is blindsided 5–4 over Ursula, making her the first person voted out of the game.
248	2	"The Praying Mantis"	Days 3–5	18 February 2025
At the Brawn tribe, Nash starts feeling on the outs after the votes last night and investigates who voted for him. Zen lets him know he was one of the votes. At the Brains camp, Kent starts planting seeds that Myles is the biggest target and should be out first. Other tribe mates are still wary of Kent. Indy notices the women are close and suspects a girls' alliance has already formed without her. Kristen and Logan plan to pull in some guys for safety in numbers. Rich and Max take the bait but plan to use the women to further their game.: Reward challenge: Tribe members race down a giant slide, attempting to grab sandbags on their way down. Once they get all their sandbags, they use them to knock down puzzle pieces. Tribes must then swim out to complete the giant floating puzzle. The first tribe to finish wins a reward of either a large fish or a large fishing kit.; Brains win rewards. They choose the fishing gear over the large tuna fish. Aly and Karin attempt to get the guys to help finish building the shelter. The girls are growing tired of the men not pulling their weight at camp. They plan to target Rich first. Indy is a bit suspicious of her placement within the girls' alliance.: Immunity challenge: Two tribe mates must climb and untie knots to release a giant spool. The rest of the tribe must then push the spool through a course, gathering sandbags and targets along the way. Lastly, the first tribe to land one sandbag on each of the four targets wins immunity.; Brawn win immunity. Immediately when they get back to camp, Kent targets Myles. Suspecting all is good with his plan, he goes into the woods alone until tribal council. Indy voices she does not want to be just a number for the women but a contributor to the conversation. She goes to the boys to vote out Karin instead. The boys do not fully trust her and return to the woman with her plan. The coven does not think Indy is a trustworthy partner. This leaves the tribe unknown on who to vote out, Rich, Myles, or Indy. At Tribal Council, Kent spills that he burned Max's hat on night one. He planned to pin the burning on Myles. Indy comes under fire for spilling the Rich plan to the men. She stands her ground that the women were the ones who wanted Rich out. They all wanted a "women strong" game but are still unsure after Indy decides to fracture the plan. When the votes are read, Indy and Kent vote for Myles while the rest of the tribe vote for Indy. She becomes the second person voted out in a 10–2 vote.
249	3	"Stoic"	Days 6–7	19 February 2025
At the Brains camp, Max is hurt after Kent admitted to throwing his hat into the fire. The Coven host a meeting at the water well to talk about how to stay in the majority and whether to get rid of Kent or Rich next. AJ and Kaelen are beginning to pick up on the girls' alliance and have talks on how to keep them in the minority.: Reward challenge: One tribe member squares off on opposite ends of a floating net in the ocean. On go, they must attempt to grab a flag on the opposite while preventing the other tribe from doing the same. The first person to grab their flag scores a point. The first tribe to five points wins a reward for everything needed to make loaded fries.; Brawn wins reward. Heading back to camp, Zen notices his fingers are a little sore from the challenge but is not too worried. At the reward, Paulie finds a map to an advantage printed on his napkin. He sneaks away from camp and finds a hidden immunity idol. Zen discovers his hand has swollen up since being back from the challenge and decides to get medical to check it out. Before the Immunity challenge begins, Zen returns to the mat and lets the tribes know of his condition. Because of the fracture being to the bone, Zen is medically pulled from the game.: Immunity challenge: Tribes run through a series of obstacles, collecting rope and bamboo to build a giant pole. Then, must use that pole to push a vase off a post to retrieve a key to unlock a chest of coconut. Finally, tribes must use the coconut to hit to hit a series of targets. The first tribe to hit all the targets wins immunity.; Brawn wins immunity. Back at the Brains camp, Myles is still annoyed by how Kent acts towards him. The women want the tribe to pile votes onto Kent. AJ wants to blindside the women by pulling in people to vote for Logan as she has a major swing with a lot of tribe mates. When he chats with Ally, she gets the wrong read that he wants Rich out instead. This sends the rest of the women spiraling to get on the same page. When AJ lets Ally know Logan is his target, she immediately turns it down. When it gets back to Logan that AJ was targeting her, she wants tonight's vote to be AJ, instead of Kent. At Tribal Council, Logan voices that it is hard to see if some tribe mates are 100% with each other or have something else going on the side. Myles says he does not want to make any waves at the moment and that he was given a name and is just going with that. Kent still feels comfortable and questions if what he has been told is something he should trust. When the votes are read, Kent receives the most votes, becoming the third person voted out, 8–3.
250	4	"Perplexed Dimension"	Days 8–9	23 February 2025
251	5	"Bomb Squad!"	Days 10–12	24 February 2025
252	6	"The Pest Problem"	Days 13–14	25 February 2025
253	7	"A Date with JLP"	Days 15–16	2 March 2025
254	8	"Maggot in the Rice"	Day 18	3 March 2025
255	9	"Hostages"	Day 19	4 March 2025
256	10	"The Vault"	Days 20–21	9 March 2025
257	11	"The Strong-Arm"	Days 22–23	10 March 2025
258	12	"Just What the Doctor Ordered"	Days 24–25	11 March 2025
259	13	"Vengeance"	Days 26–28	16 March 2025
260	14	"The Buddy System"	Day 29	17 March 2025
261	15	"The Rat King"	Days 30-31	18 March 2025
262	16	"Pickled"	Days 32-33	23 March 2025
263	17	"G-R-I-M"	Days 34-35	24 March 2025
264	18	"Operation: Shut Your Pie Hole"	Days 35-37	25 March 2025
265	19	"The Magic Number"	Days 38-39	30 March 2025
266	20	"The Reaper is Coming"	Days 40-41	31 March 2025
267	21	"House of Cards"	Days 42-43	6 April 2025
268	22	"Polarising the Outcome"	Day 44	7 April 2025
269	23	"Fired Up!"	Day 45	13 April 2025
270	24	"Go with your Heart"	Days 46-47	14 April 2025

== Voting history ==
Tribal Phase (Days 1–25)

	Original Tribes						First Swap	Second Swap					Final Swap
Episode #	1	2	3		4	5	6	7	8	9	10	11	12
Day #	2	5	7		9	12	14	16	18	19	21	23	25
Eliminated	Candy	Indy	Zen	Kent	Nash	Rich (Note: Jonathan informed the Brains at Tribal Council of Day 12 that instead of voting someone out, they would vote someone to join the Brawn tribe and gain an advantage. Rich was voted to go to the Brawn tribe, and it was revealed that his advantage, which had to be played at the next tribal council regardless of which tribe was voting, would allow the holder to force two people to leave Tribal Council prior to voting - Granting them immunity, but prohibiting them from voting.)	Ally	Rich	Ursula	Max	Noonan	Zara (Note: Jonathan informed the Brains at Tribal Council of Day 23 that instead of voting someone out, they would vote someone to join the Brawn tribe. Zara was voted to go to the Brawn tribe.)	Ben
Votes	5–4–0 (Note: Nash played a hidden immunity idol on himself; therefore three votes against him were negated.)	10–2	Evacuated	8–3	7–2–1	9–1	4–3	7–1–1	6–2	4–1–0 (Note: Myles played a hidden immunity idol on himself; therefore four votes against him were negated.)	2–0–0 (Note: Paulie played a hidden immunity idol on himself; therefore four votes against him were negated.) (Note: AJ played a hidden immunity idol on himself; therefore one vote against him was negated.)	4–2–2	Left (Note: Ben left the game for undisclosed reasons. This cancelled that night's Brawn vote.)
Voter	Vote												
Myles		Indy		Kent		Rich	Ally			Kate		Zara	
Kaelan		Indy		Myles		Rich	Ally	Rich	Ursula		~~Paulie~~		
AJ		Indy		Kent		Rich	Ally	Rich	Ursula		~~Paulie~~		
Zara		Indy		Kent		Rich	Ally			~~Myles~~		Myles	
Kate	Candy				Nash					Max		Laura	
Morgan	Candy				Nash					Max		Laura	
Kristin	Candy				Nash			Rich	Noonan		Noonan		
Logan		Indy		Kent		Rich	Myles	Rich	Ursula		~~Paulie~~		
Karin		Indy		Kent		Rich	Immune (Note: After the immunity challenge, Rich gave his scroll advantage to Max, as it had to be played at that night's tribal council. The advantage allowed the holder to choose two people to leave tribal council prior to casting of votes. Max chose Karin and Laura, who had to immediately return to camp and could not vote or be voted for.)	Rich	Ursula		~~Paulie~~		
Paulie	Ursula				Nash			Rich	Ursula		Noonan		
Laura		Indy		Kent		Rich	Immune			~~Myles~~		Myles	
PD	~~Nash~~				Nash					~~Myles~~		Zara	
Jesse	Ursula				Ursula					Max		Zara	
Ben	Ursula				Nash					Max		Zara	
Noonan	Ursula				Ursula			Rich	Ursula		~~AJ~~		
Max		Indy		Kent		Rich	Myles			~~Myles~~			
Ursula	Candy				Nash			Noonan	Noonan				
Rich		Indy		Myles		Max		Logan					
Ally		Indy		Kent		Rich	Myles						
Nash	Candy				Morgan								
Kent		Myles		Myles									
Zen	~~Nash~~												
Indy		Myles											
Candy	~~Nash~~												

Individual Phase (Days 26–47)

	Merged Tribe															
Episode #	13	14	15	16			17	18	19			20	21	22	23	24
Day #	28	29	31	33			35	37	39			41	43	44	45	46
Eliminated	Jesse	PD	Laura	Paulie (Note: Jonathan informed the tribe on Day 33 that instead of voting someone out of the game, the tribe would be split up into two new temporary tribes, the Bounty tribe who would remain at their current camp, and the Barren tribe who would be sent to a new camp. As Kate had won individual immunity, she would automatically remain on the Bounty tribe and would select one person to stay with her. The tribe would then vote, and the two people with the most votes would be voted onto the Barren tribe. The six remaining tribemates would then draw rocks to determine the three that would be sent to the Barren tribe, and three that would remain on the Bounty Tribe.)	Logan (Note: The Tribal Council vote for the second highest number of votes resulted in a tie. Per the rules, a second vote was held where the castaways involved in the tie would not vote and the remaining castaways could only vote for those who tied.)	Kaelan, Kristin & Myles (Note: Kate chose Morgan to stay on the Bounty tribe, and Paulie and Logan had been voted onto the Barren tribe. AJ, Kaelan, Karin, Kristin, Myles, and Zara then drew rocks to determine who would be sent to the Barren tribe, with a White Rock meaning Barren tribe, and a Black Rock meaning Bounty tribe.)	Paulie	Karin	Tie (Note: The vote resulted in a tie. Per the rules, a second vote was held where the castaways involved in the tie would not vote and the remaining castaways could only vote for those who tied.)	Tie (Note: After two rounds of voting, Tribal Council remained tied. Per the rules, the non-tied castaways must come to a unanimous decision as to whom to eliminate between the tied castaways, or else one of the non-immune, deliberating castaways would be eliminated by random draw.)	Logan	Kristin	Morgan	Kate	Zara	AJ
Votes	6–5–2	3–0 (Note: Myles played a hidden immunity idol on Paulie; therefore nine votes against him were negated.)	3–2–0 (Note: Logan played a hidden immunity idol on herself; therefore six votes against her were negated.)	4–3–3	5–3	Rock Draw	3–1–1–0 (Note: Myles played a hidden immunity idol on himself; therefore five votes against him were negated.)	5–3–1	4–4	3–3	Consensus (Note: Due to a deadlocked tie, the remaining non-tied castaways have to come to a consensus decision to vote out either Logan or Zara or else everyone else except Kaelan, who has individual immunity, will be drawing rocks. AJ, Kaelan, Kate, Kristin, Morgan and Myles decided to eliminate Logan.)	4–3	4–2	2–1–1–0 (Note: Myles played a hidden immunity idol on himself; therefore one vote against him was negated.)	3–1	1–0
Voter	Vote															
Myles	Paulie	PD	~~Logan~~	Paulie	Logan	White Rock	Kristin	Karin	Logan	Logan	Logan	Kristin	Morgan	AJ	Zara	None (Note: This contestant was only able to vote for one other contestant, thus they were not eligible to vote.)
Kaelan	Jesse	~~Paulie~~	Laura	Logan	Logan	White Rock	Paulie	Karin	Logan	Logan	Logan	Kristin	Morgan	~~Myles~~	Zara	AJ
AJ	Paulie	PD	Laura	Paulie	None (Note: AJ and Logan were ineligible to vote on the revote.)	Black Rock	~~Myles~~	Karin	Logan	Logan	Logan	Kristin	Morgan	Kate	Zara	None
Zara	Jesse	~~Paulie~~	~~Logan~~	Logan	Logan	Black Rock	~~Myles~~	Myles	Logan	None (Note: Logan and Zara were not eligible to vote in the second round of voting.)	None (Note: Due to a deadlocked tie, the non-tied castaways will have to come to a consensus decision to vote out either Logan or Zara. They chose to eliminate Logan.)	Kristin	Morgan	Kate	AJ	
Kate	Jesse	~~Paulie~~	~~Logan~~	Paulie	Logan	Bounty Tribe	~~Myles~~	Zara	Zara	Zara	Logan	Myles	Myles	Kaelan		
Morgan	Jesse	~~Paulie~~	~~Logan~~	Logan	Logan	Bounty Tribe	~~Myles~~	Zara	Zara	Zara	Logan	Myles	Myles			
Kristin	Paulie	~~Paulie~~	~~Logan~~	Paulie	AJ	White Rock	Paulie	Karin	Zara	Zara	Logan	Myles				
Logan	Jesse	~~Paulie~~	AJ	AJ	None	Barren Tribe	Paulie	Karin	Zara	None	None					
Karin	Jesse	~~Paulie~~	~~Logan~~	AJ	AJ	Black Rock	~~Myles~~	Zara								
Paulie	Zara	PD	Laura	AJ	AJ	Barren Tribe	Logan									
Laura	Paulie	~~Paulie~~	AJ													
PD	Paulie	~~Paulie~~														
Jesse	Zara															

Final vote
Episode #	24	
Day #	47	
Finalist	Myles	Kaelan
Vote	7–1	
Juror	Vote	
AJ	Myles	
Zara	Myles	
Kate	Myles	
Kristin		Kaelan
Logan	Myles	
Karin	Myles	
Paulie	Myles	
Laura	Myles	

== Reception ==
=== Ratings ===
Wk	Episode		Airdate	Timeslot	Overnight			7 Day Timeshift			Source
Wk	Episode		Airdate	Timeslot	Reach viewers	Total viewers	Rank	Reach viewers	Total viewers	Rank	Source
1	1	"Premiere"	17 February 2025	Monday 7:30 pm	1,021,000	527,000	12	1,404,000	836,000	9	
1	2	"The Praying Mantis"	18 February 2025	Tuesday 7:30 pm	962,000	512,000	12	1,326,000	798,000	9	
1	3	"Stoic"	19 February 2025	Wednesday 7:30 pm	993,000	486,000	14	1,291,000	776,000	10	
2	4	"Perplexed Dimension"	23 February 2025	Sunday 7:00 pm	1,097,000	554,000	10	1,455,000	806,000	7	
2	5	"Bomb Squad!"	24 February 2025	Monday 7:30 pm	973,000	520,000	13	1,297,000	759,000	11	
2	6	"The Pest Problem"	25 February 2025	Tuesday 7:30 pm	1,025,000	525,000	12	1,342,000	774,000	7	
3	7	"A Date with JLP"	2 March 2025	Sunday 7:00 pm	1,048,000	543,000	10	1,333,000	763,000	7	
3	8	"Maggot in the Rice"	3 March 2025	Monday 7:30 pm	910,000	559,000	17	1,172,000	770,000	13	
3	9	"Hostages"	4 March 2025	Tuesday 7:30 pm	979,000	505,000	13	1,290,000	737,000	10	
4	10	"The Vault"	9 March 2025	Sunday 7:00 pm	1,011,000	555,000	13	1,307,000	767,000	9	
4	11	"The Strong-Arm"	10 March 2025	Monday 7:30 pm	1,023,000	612,000	13	1,277,000	821,000	10	
4	12	"Just What the Doctor Ordered"	11 March 2025	Tuesday 7:30 pm	1,027,000	555,000	14	1,332,000	786,000	9	
5	13	"Vengeance"	16 March 2025	Sunday 7:00 pm	1,223,000	600,000	14	1,461,000	814,000	8	
5	14	"The Buddy System"	17 March 2025	Monday 7:30 pm	1,241,000	654,000	10	1,454,000	836,000	8	
5	15	"The Rat King"	18 March 2025	Tuesday 7:30 pm	1,107,000	568,000	13	1,396,000	780,000	8	
6	16	"Pickled"	23 March 2025	Sunday 7:00 pm	1,022,000	601,000	11	1,333,000	815,000	6	
6	17	"G-R-I-M"	24 March 2025	Monday 7:30 pm	1,233,000	658,000	11	1,499,000	853,000	7	
6	18	"Operation: Shut Your Pie Hole"	25 March 2025	Tuesday 7:30 pm	1,201,000	622,000	11	1,557,000	855,000	5	
7	19	"The Magic Number"	30 March 2025	Sunday 7:00 pm	1,133,000	629,000	9	1,408,000	820,000	6	
7	20	"The Reaper Is Coming"	31 March 2025	Monday 7:30 pm	1,109,000	630,000	12	1,302,000	824,000	9	
8	21	"House of Cards"	6 April 2025	Sunday 7:00 pm	1,082,000	617,000	10	1,275,000	799,000	9	
8	22	"Polarising The Outcome"	7 April 2025	Monday 7:30 pm	1,040,000	615,000	14	1,298,000	808,000	11	
9	23	"Fired Up!"	13 April 2025	Sunday 7:00 pm	1,053,000	643,000	8	1,250,000	796,000	5	
9	24	"Go With Your Heart"	14 April 2025	Monday 7:30 pm	1,368,000	764,000	6	1,551,000	932,000	5	

=== Awards ===
Year	Award	Category	Result	Ref.
2025	TV Week Logies	Best Competition Reality Program	Nominated	
