= Australian Survivor: Redemption =

Season of television series Australian Survivor

- Season 14
- Presented by: David Genat
- No. of days: 45
- No. of castaways: 24
- Winner: Caleb Beeby
- Runner-up: Jackson Goonrey
- Location: Upolu, Samoa
- No. of episodes: 24

Release
- Original network: Network 10
- Original release: 23 February – 14 April 2026

Additional information
- Filming dates: 31 July – 15 September 2025

Season chronology
- ← Previous; Australia V The World Next → Rivals

Australian Survivor: Redemption, is the fourteenth season of Australian Survivor and the twelfth to air on Network 10. The season premiered on 22 February 2026 and is based on the international reality competition franchise Survivor.

The season was filmed in Samoa from July to September 2025 and premiered on 23 February 2026 on Network 10. This was the first season hosted by former contestant David Genat and featured 24 castaways competing for 45 days for a grand prize of A$500,000. The contestants are all people who are "Seeking Redemption" and looking to "Rewrite their Story". This includes 4 returning players who have not won, along with 20 Survivor newcomers.

After 45 days of competition, Caleb Beeby was named the "Sole Survivor" after defeating Jackson Goonrey in a 6–3 jury vote.

== Production ==
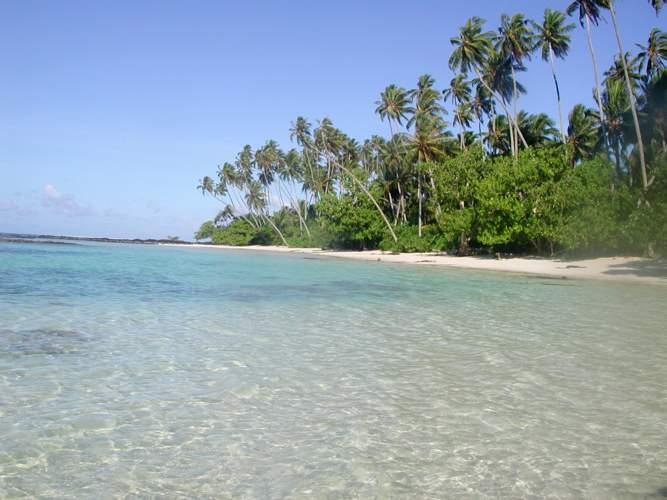
The season filmed in Upolu in Samoa.

Immediately following his vote out on Survivor: Australia V The World on 18 August 2025, David Genat was announced as the new host, replacing Jonathan LaPaglia, who had hosted the series since its revival in 2016. At the same time, the season's title and its return to filming in Samoa were revealed. Filming was already underway at the time of the announcement, and the season was confirmed to air in 2026.

With a new host and new direction, this season has been marketed as the "New Era" of Australian Survivor. The following day, Genat shared a behind-the-scenes video on social media, offering a sneak peek at one of the challenge sets. The premiere date was announced to be 23 February 2026.

For the first time since All Stars and for the fifth time overall (after Australian Survivor 2002, Australian Survivor 2017, Australian Survivor: Champions V Contenders and Australian Survivor: All Stars), the season featured a final vote reveal and reunion show before a studio audience. The reunion was produced overlooking Sydney Harbour at the Overseas Passenger Terminal in Sydney.

== Contestants ==
The four returning players, Brooke Jowett, Harry Hills, Mark Warnock and Simon Mee, were revealed by Network 10 along with the first trailer featuring the full cast. In addition to the returning Survivor players, the season also features AFL footballer Ben Davis, former Big Brother Australia 2022 contestant Johnson Ashak, The Traitors NZ 2 contestant Cat Hooker and brother of Mat Rogers, a former Australian Survivor player, Don Rogers, who also competed on The Voice.

List of Australian Survivor: Redemption contestants
Contestant	Original tribe	Shuffled tribe	Merged tribe	Finish
Daniel Lindberg 27, South Hedland, WA	Bounty			1st voted out Day 2
Cat Hooker 41, Melbourne, VIC	Barren			2nd voted out Day 5
Eliza Reilly 34, Adelaide, SA	Bounty			3rd voted out Day 7
Paula Drew 33, Perth, WA	Bounty			4th voted out Day 9
Harry Hills 36, Perth, WA Champions V Contenders II All Stars	Bounty			5th voted out Day 11
Johnson Ashak 29, Maroubra, NSW	Barren			6th voted out Day 13
Don Rogers 51, Sydney, NSW	Barren	Bounty		7th voted out Day 15
Lyndl Kean 35, Sydney, NSW	Bounty	Bounty		8th voted out Day 17
Tez Vlamis 24, Melbourne, VIC	Barren	Bounty		9th voted out Day 18
Aisha Wighton 29, Brisbane, QLD	Bounty	Barren		10th voted out Day 20
Faith Setiawan 34, Parkes, NSW	Barren	Bounty		11th voted out Day 24
Lottie Rae 32, Trangie, NSW	Bounty	Barren	Togiola	12th voted out Day 26
Richard Skimin 46, Sydney, NSW	Bounty	Bounty	Togiola	13th voted out Day 28
Mark Warnock 37, Townsville, QLD Titans V Rebels	Barren	Bounty	Togiola	14th voted out 1st jury member Day 30
Blanche Cruz 47, Gold Coast, QLD	Barren	Barren	Togiola	15th voted out 2nd jury member Day 32
Ben Davis 28, Adelaide, SA	Barren	Barren	Togiola	16th voted out 3rd jury member Day 34
Simon Mee 36, Brisbane, QLD Brains V Brawn Heroes V Villains	Bounty	Barren	Togiola	17th voted out 4th jury member Day 36
Cameron Quashie 26, Melbourne, VIC	Bounty	Barren	Togiola	18th voted out 5th jury member Day 38
Brooke Jowett 32, Melbourne, VIC 2016 All Stars	Barren	Barren	Togiola	19th voted out 6th jury member Day 40
Keeley Jenkinson 30, Sunshine Coast, QLD	Barren	Bounty	Togiola	20th voted out 7th jury member Day 41
Sally Foord 36, Dunsborough, WA	Barren	Bounty	Togiola	21st voted out 8th jury member Day 43
Lauren "Loz" McMahon 46, Maungakotukutuku, NZ	Bounty	Barren	Togiola	22nd voted out 9th jury member Day 44
Jackson Goonrey 24, Sydney, NSW	Bounty	Barren	Togiola	Runner-up; Day 45
Caleb Beeby 28, Tarwin Lower, VIC	Barren	Bounty	Togiola	Sole Survivor; Day 45

== Season summary ==
Challenge winners and eliminations by episode

Tribal phase (Days 1–24)
Episode			Challenge winner(s)		Eliminated	Finish
No.	Title	Original air date	Reward	Immunity	Eliminated	Finish
1	"I Forgot Your Name"	23 February 2026	Purple (Note: The opening reward challenge allowed the winners to become the Bounty Tribe (with a pre-constructed shelter and supplies), with the losers becoming Barren Tribe (given minimal supplies). Purple Tribe won the opening challenge.)	Barren	Daniel	1st voted out Day 2
2	"Ghosts"	24 February 2026	Barren	Bounty	Cat	2nd voted out Day 5
3	"In the Middle of Night"	25 February 2026	Bounty	Barren	Eliza	3rd voted out Day 7
4	"Piece of Cake"	2 March 2026	Bounty	Barren	Paula	4th voted out Day 9
5	"Urge to Do Terrible Things"	3 March 2026	None	Barren	Harry	5th voted out Day 11
5	"Urge to Do Terrible Things"	3 March 2026	None	Lyndl (Note: At Day 11’s Immunity Challenge, a Special Individual Immunity Challenge was held for the Bounty Tribe. Lyndl won this challenge)	Harry	5th voted out Day 11
6	"Operation Snuff the Weasel"	4 March 2026	Bounty	Bounty	Johnson	6th voted out Day 13
7	"Leopards Don't Change Their Spots"	9 March 2026	Bounty (Note: While this challenge occurred in the Original tribes, a tribe shuffle occurred after the challenge. The challenge winners took their reward to their new tribe.)	Barren	Don	7th voted out Day 15
8	"I Want His Pants"	10 March 2026	None	Barren	Lyndl	8th voted out Day 17
9	"Don't Talk Dirty to Me"	11 March 2026	None	~~Simon~~ (Note: Both Barren and Bounty were to attend Tribal Council. In the Immunity Challenge, a member of each tribe would pair up to compete in Immunity. Simon and Faith won the immunity challenge.) (Richard) (Note: At Tribal Council, Simon chose to give his immunity to Richard.)	Tez	9th voted out Day 18
9	"Don't Talk Dirty to Me"	11 March 2026	None	Faith	Tez	9th voted out Day 18
9	"Don't Talk Dirty to Me"	11 March 2026	None	Simon [Barren] (Note: At Tribal Council, the players were informed the players that a Fire Making Duel would occur to determine which tribe would win Immunity from that night's vote. A representative for each tribe would be chosen by each tribe, with Mark chosen for the Bounty and Simon for Barren. Simon won, and the Barren tribe were awarded Immunity.)	Tez	9th voted out Day 18
10	"An Oscar Winning Performance"	15 March 2026	Barren (Note: The reward challenge was played in six head-to-head rounds. Each tribe won an item in each round.)	Bounty	Aisha	10th voted out Day 20
10	"An Oscar Winning Performance"	15 March 2026	Bounty	Bounty	Aisha	10th voted out Day 20
11	"Draw Up the Divorce Papers"	16 March 2026	None	Barren	No elimination on Day 21 due to Exile Vote. (Note: Instead of voting out a tribemate, the Bounty tribe voted for three of their own to be Exiled on Redemption Beach. Caleb, Sally & Keeley were voted into Exile.)	
12	"Sitting Little Wet Sad Ducks"	18 March 2026	Caleb (Note: As part of the Redemption Beach twist, the exiled players competed to win their way off Redemption Beach. Caleb won this challenge. Sally & Keeley remained on Redemption Beach and would automatically join the tribe that lost the Immunity Challenge at Tribal Council, eligible to be voted off but ineligible to vote.)	Barren	Faith	11th voted out Day 24

Merge phase (Days 25–45)
Episode			Challenge winner(s)		Eliminated	Finish
No.	Title	Original air date	Reward	Immunity	Eliminated	Finish
13	"Shake the Game"	22 March 2026	Sally	Brooke	Lottie	12th voted out Day 26
14	"The Soul Collector"	23 March 2026	None	Simon	Richard	13th voted out Day 28
15	"Like Venomous Snakes"	24 March 2026	Ben, Jackson, Keeley, Loz, Simon [Cameron]	Brooke	Mark	14th voted out 1st jury member Day 30
16	"Arts and Crafts"	29 March 2026	Caleb, Cameron, Jackson, Loz, Simon	Simon	Blanche	15th voted out 2nd jury member Day 32
17	"Wimp"	30 March 2026	None	Simon	Ben	16th voted out 3rd jury member Day 34
18	"On the Rocks"	1 April 2026	Cameron, Simon [Brooke, Jackson]	Brooke	Simon	17th voted out 4th jury member Day 36
19	"Sold the Dream"	5 April 2026	Cameron [Keeley, Sally]	Keeley	Cameron	18th voted out 5th jury member Day 38
20	"Maggots"	6 April 2026	None	Keeley	Brooke	19th voted out 6th jury member Day 40
21	"Half and Half"	7 April 2026	None	Jackson	Keeley	20th voted out 7th jury member Day 41
22	"Build a Raft"	12 April 2026	None	Jackson	Sally	21st voted out 8th jury member Day 43
23	"You Know I've Got You"	13 April 2026	None	Caleb	Loz	22nd voted out 9th jury member Day 44
24	"Redemption"	14 April 2026				
24	"Redemption"	14 April 2026			Jury vote	
24	"Redemption"	14 April 2026			Jackson	Runner-up; Day 45
24	"Redemption"	14 April 2026			Caleb	Sole Survivor; Day 45

== Episodes ==
No. overall	No. in season	Title	Timeline	Original release date
281	1	"I Forgot Your Name"	Days 1–2	23 February 2026
Twenty new castaways and four returning players arrive in Samoa, ready for their own redemption story to begin. David Genat welcomes them to Australian Survivor: Redemption and divides them into two unnamed tribes of twelve.: Reward Challenge: The players must stack heavy blocks to form a pyramid, then push it along a track. One player climbs the pyramid to retrieve a key and unlock a torch. Once the pyramid reaches the end of the track, the player with the torch races back to light the cauldron. The first tribe to finish wins reward.; The purple tribe wins reward. They become the "Bounty" tribe and receive fruits and vegetables, a hammock, a stocked firepit with flint, and a fully built shelter. As Lyndl was the player sent to retrieve the torch in the challenge, she secretly gained a clue to a potential advantage. The green tribe becomes the "Barren" tribe and receives absolutely nothing to begin the game with. At the Bounty beach, the players introduce themselves and soak in the perks of winning the first reward challenge. Harry and Simon are immediately seen as big targets, as they are the returning players on their beach, while Daniel struggles with the names of his tribemates. Lyndl reads the scroll she gained from the reward challenge, which tells her that an immunity idol is buried under the tribe flag in the middle of camp. In the middle of the night, she asks Loz for help to find the idol. Lyndl finds it, but it comes with a twist: the idol can only be used by a Barren tribe member. The Bounty idol is hidden at the same location, but at the Barren beach. At the Barren beach, the players gather to get to know each other, but they must also begin gathering supplies and building their camp from scratch. Don decides to keep his relationship to former Australian Survivor player Mat Rogers a secret and begins to take control as the building leader. Mark and Faith form an alliance called the "Ruby Soho Alliance".: Immunity Challenge: The tribes must maneuver three wheels up and over high poles then transport them over a ramp, under a net, and up into a tower. Finally, they must roll them down a steep ramp into three narrow gates.; The Barren tribe wins immunity with all three wheels landing in their gates, while Bounty has none. Lyndl shares her idol clue with Brooke on the Barren tribe, hoping she will switch idols with her when she finds it. Back at the Bounty camp, Lyndl throws out Richard's name, but Cameron feels that Jackson would be a good target to make a big move from the start. Elsewhere, others begins to feel that Daniel is too excited and could be a liability in the long run. At Tribal Council, Eliza voices how thankful the tribe is to have the returning players, Harry and Simon. Daniel comes under fire for his sloppy gameplay after mistakenly saying Jackson's name while throwing out names at camp. Lottie admits that the timing has to be perfect for big moves and says this is not the time. When the votes are read, Daniel is voted out of the tribe unanimously, 11–1, leaving his jacket with Simon on his way out.
282	2	"Ghosts"	Days 3–5	24 February 2026
At Barren Beach, Brooke begins searching around the tribe flag for the Bounty Immunity Idol, though she struggles to find time when no one else is around. Johnson tries to gather a group of allies in Sally and Ben. Mark notices how hard Johnson is playing around camp and grows wary of him, especially after his appearance on Big Brother 2022. Mark and Brooke finally find time to talk and agree to team up. That night, they meet under the tribe flag and begin digging for the idol together, eventually finding it. Brooke plans to try to exchange both idols with Lyndl at the next challenge. Back at the Bounty tribe, Simon and Harry continue meeting secretly at night, planning to each take control of different areas of the tribe. Lottie begins to grow suspicious of his gameplay.: Reward Challenge: Each tribe chooses players to face off against the other tribe. Using padded bags, players attempt to push past their opponent to ring a bell, scoring a point. The first tribe to score three points wins reward.; Barren wins reward: a trip to the Survivor Shop. There, they can choose four items to improve camp life. They send Blanche and Ben, who select flint, a fish, a tarp, and bedsheets.: Immunity Challenge: The tribes must swim out to retrieve two heavy chests and maneuver them through a wall and onto the beach. One player climbs a tower and uses a pole to release a key to open the chests. Then, the tribe must unscramble letters to spell "Immunity" and place the word on an unsteady frame. Finally, they must knock down each letter with sandbags to win immunity.; The Bounty tribe wins immunity. As they leave, Lyndl and Brooke are unable to switch idols. Don becomes an easy target because he is too vocal around camp and difficult to live with. However, Mark and Faith have other plans, wanting to split the majority of the votes between Johnson and Sally. Cat sees Mark and Faith as major threats and wants to switch the votes onto Faith instead. She lies separately to Sally, Tez, and Brooke, telling each of them that Faith is throwing their name out. Mark senses something is wrong, and Brooke relays Cat's move to him. He knows how she played on The Traitors NZ. At Tribal Council, Mark and Ben speak about trusting and protecting their allies. Tez asks Ben directly whether he has been throwing his name out. Cat confronts Johnson, accusing him and Ben of spreading her name. Mark and Keeley quietly step away from the group to discuss Cat going rouge, leaving the others confused. The players begin moving around in an attempt to switch the vote. When the votes are read, Cat is voted out in a 7–2–2–1 vote, with Johnson and Don receiving two votes each and Sally receiving one.
283	3	"In the Middle of Night"	Days 6–7	25 February 2026
At Barren Beach, Mark feels that he is on top of his tribe and in control. Johnson goes into damage control after being left out of the Cat vote the night before and sets his sights on Mark. Back at the Bounty tribe, Eliza and Jackson continue to grow closer and lock in a final two. While Lottie has her sights set on Harry, Harry plans to gather the numbers to blindside Lottie. Lyndl spends the morning planning to make the secret idol swap at the challenge.: Reward Challenge: Tribes must select four tribemates to work together to swing a wrecking ball and knock over three targets, winning a round. The first tribe to win two rounds wins reward.; Bounty wins reward: coffee and donuts. The tribe is surprised with mugs that have photos from home printed on them. During the challenge, Brooke and Lyndl are able to switch their hidden immunity idols. Eliza hears Lyndl's name mentioned as a possible target. Late at night, she relays that information to Lyndl, who does not take it well.: Immunity Challenge: The tribes must race up a tower and roll a series of barrels down a ramp, push them through a track, and roll them across a bridge. Finally, they must place them on a narrow shelf and knock them down using coconuts. The first tribe to knock down all the barrels wins immunity.; The Barren tribe wins immunity. Back at Bounty, Harry does not feel that his alliance of eight is quite ready to come together. He believes the easiest vote at the moment is Loz. Eliza is happy with that plan, as it is not her or Jackson. Lyndl grows wary of Eliza after Eliza suggests that they are both on the bottom of the tribe and she does not believe this to be true. Paula hears this and begins pushing to shift the vote from Loz to Eliza instead. Lottie starts to realize that Harry and Paula currently have too much control over the votes. At Tribal Council, the tribe feels defeated, especially after winning reward and having all the necessities to succeed. Loz knows her name is an easy vote, as she has already received a vote before. Lottie and Cameron do not want to be seen as running the tribe and say they are simply following a plan tonight. Jackson and Eliza both feel confident about the vote and moving forward. However, when the votes are read, they are shocked as Eliza is voted out in an 8–3 vote, with Harry casting the third vote for Loz.
284	4	"Piece of Cake"	Days 8–9	2 March 2026
As the Bounty tribe returns to camp, Jackson feels alone and upset about being blindsided. Lyndl pulls him aside to let him know she was the one behind the Eliza vote. Harry tries to take Jackson under his wing. Lottie notices this and wants to target the pair of Harry and Paula, believing they have too much control. At the Barren tribe, Don is still feeling on top of the tribe but slips up by revealing his last name. He hates keeping his brother's identity a secret, so he shares it with Mark.: Reward Challenge: Tribes go head-to-head in a rounds of tug of war, pulling a tribemate into a throw zone. Once in the throw zone, that tribemate must attempt to land a sandbag on a high beam. The first tribe to win two rounds wins the reward.; Bounty wins reward: chocolate cake. However, the cake is divided unequally from largest to smallest, with one fewer piece than there are players. Richard selects who receives each piece, leaving Cameron without any cake. Aisha finds a clue to an advantage hidden in her cake. This leads her to a "Safety Without Power" advantage. She can save a member of the losing tribe and choose a person from the winning tribe to cast a vote in their place.: Immunity Challenge: The tribes must dig out a giant boulder and roll it through obstacles, retrieving bags of balls along the way. They then climb a high tower and run down a ramp. Two tribemates must roll the balls up a track to knock down five targets. The first tribe to finish wins immunity.; The Barren tribe wins immunity again. Back at Bounty, Paula and Harry feel uneasy about the tribe's dynamic and attempt to orchestrate a blindside against Lyndl. In an attempt to change the vote, Lottie tells Simon that Paula is targeting him. Simon goes to Harry to confirm if he is still safe but remains on edge after their conversation. As they prepare to leave, the tribe remains split between voting for Lyndl and Paula. At Tribal Council, Harry argues that the tribe should make the simple move. The tribe discusses who is leading the vote, believing that no one has fully stepped up yet. Jackson brings up that Lyndl claimed responsibility for the Eliza vote and says he feels played by everyone. When the votes are read, Paula is voted out in a 7–2–1 vote, with Harry and Paula voting for Lyndl and Lyndl being the sole vote for Jackson.
285	5	"Urge to Do Terrible Things"	Days 10–11	3 March 2026
Returning from Tribal Council, Jackson is confused about who voted for him. Harry is upset about being blindsided and vows to burn the tribe to the ground. He knows he must appeal to Lottie to get back into good standing with his tribemates. She feels good about him at the moment, and the two agree to target Lyndl or Loz. At Barren Beach, Don comes clean to his tribe about his relationship with Australian Survivor legend Mat Rogers. Caleb feels good about his alliance with Mark and Don but gets wind that Johnson wants to target Mark next. Mark confronts Johnson and Ben.: Immunity Challenge: The tribes must use a sled to move sandbags over a wall and through a gate, then use those sandbags to retrieve puzzle pieces. They must use those pieces to solve a hanging puzzle. The first tribe to get it right wins immunity.; The Barren tribe wins immunity for a third time. Aisha uses her "Safety Without Power" advantage and saves Loz from the Bounty tribe, choosing Caleb from Barren to join them later at Tribal Council. Loz leaves with Barren for the evening, and Bounty is given another chance at immunity.: Individual Immunity Challenge: Players must balance a ball on a small disc while standing on pegs. The last player standing on the pegs with their ball still balanced wins individual immunity.; Lyndl wins immunity and is safe from the vote. At the Barren camp, Caleb interrogates Loz about the Bounty tribe dynamic. Loz says that if she were voting, she would want Harry gone tonight. As the Bounty tribe gets ready for another vote, Harry and Jackson know they are in danger with both Lyndl and Loz safe. Lottie would rather go after Jackson over Harry. The tribe feels it may still be too early to get rid of Harry. At Tribal Council, Caleb joins them from the Barren tribe. He comes in hard and chaotic voicing that Harry is far too powerful to keep in the game and pushes for the tribe to vote him out. Harry and Jackson reveal that they stole the flint and hid it in one of their bags. They propose voting out Richard so the tribe can keep the flint from walking out with one of them. Jackson goes rogue, reveals that he has the flint and throws Harry under the bus. When the votes are read, Harry is voted out in a 7–1–1 vote, with Harry voting for Richard and Caleb voting for Jackson after Lottie requested he do so in case an idol was played.
286	6	"Operation Snuff the Weasel"	Days 12–13	4 March 2026
Caleb returns to the Barren beach and lets his tribe know that Harry was voted out at Tribal Council. He tries to smooth things over with the returning players on his beach after previously saying that players should be gunning for them. Elsewhere, Johnson attempts to regain Mark's trust after their confrontation the other day. Mark sees through his lies but wants to keep him calm in case they lose immunity. At the Bounty tribe, Simon feels emotional after voting Harry out. Aisha begins to realize that Lottie was pushing a different agenda by wanting Jackson gone the previous night.: Reward Challenge: Two members of each tribe must race to retrieve a ball in the water before the other tribe. They must then give that ball to a shooter, who attempts to hit or knock three members of the opposing tribe off their narrow beam to score a point. The first tribe to score two points wins reward.; The Bounty tribe wins reward: nachos and margaritas. The tribe finally interviews Loz after she spent time with the Barren tribe. Lottie feels let down that Aisha did not go along with her plan to get Jackson out. The Barren tribe feels defeated, as they have not won a reward challenge in twelve days. Don believes that if he had been on the slingshot, he would have won it for them. Lyndl and Keeley begin to have a bad feeling about Tez and his relationship with Mark. They come up with a plan called "Operation Snuff the Weasel" to get him voted out.: Immunity Challenge: Tribes must dive down to unlock a series of crates. They must transport those crates through the water, over a wall, and up a high tower on the beach. A tribe member must smash the crates, releasing the balls inside. Finally, members must use a vertical maze to guide the balls into six spots. The first tribe to finish wins immunity.; The Bounty tribe wins immunity. At the Barren camp, Mark gathers a group to secretly target Johnson. He tells Johnson that Don is throwing his name out so that Johnson will cast his vote for Don. Lyndl and Keeley want to go through with "Operation Weasel." Along with Sally, they suspect a tribe swap may be happening soon and want either Tez or Caleb out before then. When they try to bring Johnson in on the plan, he becomes a little too excited and is not fully convinced. Mark senses this plan brewing and grows cautious of the girls. At Tribal Council, the tribe is wary of being back after not attending for eight days. Brooke plays her hidden immunity idol on herself, suspecting a tribe swap and knowing it can only be used on the Barren tribe. When the votes are read, Johnson is voted out in a 7–4 vote, with Don receiving the four votes from Ben, Blanche, Tez, and Johnson.
287	7	"Leopards Don't Change Their Spots"	Days 14–15	9 March 2026
Don realizes he may be in danger at the next vote since he received four votes at the previous Tribal Council. Faith and Mark discuss the girls' alliance plan to get Caleb out. Faith reassures him that they are still good. At the Bounty tribe, Simon feels emotional after voting Harry out. Aisha begins to realize that Lottie was pushing a different agenda by wanting Jackson gone the previous night.: Reward Challenge: Tribe members must throw a ball into a chute and race through a maze in order to catch it at the end. Once they have their ball, they must attempt to shoot it into a basket, scoring a point. The first tribe to score three points wins reward.; The Bounty tribe wins reward: meat pies. In addition to the reward, it is time for the tribe swap. Caleb, Don, Faith, Keeley, Lyndl, Mark, Richard, Sally, and Tez are the new Bounty tribe, while Aisha, Ben, Blanche, Brooke, Cameron, Jackson, Loz, Lottie, and Simon are the new Barren tribe. At the new Barren beach, Aisha is excited to get to know Blanche, as she is on board with getting the returning players out. Meanwhile, Mark is feeling great with the new Bounty tribe. However, Keeley continues trying to pull Sally and Faith into an alliance called "The Three Wise Women.": Immunity Challenge: Tribes must climb over a tower, then pull open a bridge to cross. Along the way, members must untie bags of coconuts and transport them over a ramp. Finally, the tribe must raise a series of targets for them to smash with their coconuts. The first tribe to finish wins immunity.; The Barren tribe wins immunity. At Bounty, Keeley and Faith discuss the vote and believe it is better to go for Tez tonight. Mark wants to target Sally, as he thinks she is untrustworthy. However, he wants to make sure Faith still feels good and agrees to go with the Tez vote. Sally wants to make a big move and gauges whether Don would vote out Mark. Immediately after, he tells Mark, Faith, and Keeley about her plan. The target then shifts to Sally. Keeley and Faith are not fully set on this new plan as it majorly protects Mark. At Tribal Council, Richard and Lyndl are open and ready to move forward with their new tribe. Caleb and Tez discuss their differences. As they talk, Keeley sends whispers through the tribe to possibly change the vote to Don. This comes to fruition when the votes are read, and Don is voted out in a 6–2–1 vote. Sally and Tez receive the other votes from Mark and Caleb, respectively.
288	8	"I Want His Pants"	Days 16–17	10 March 2026
Back at the Bounty beach, Keeley answers questions and reassures the tribe that Don was causing too much chaos and needed to go. Caleb and Mark are upset that they were left out of the vote and feel frustrated. Mark, Keeley, and Faith form a new alliance called "Head Office." Mark also works to build relationships with the two former Bounty players, Lyndl and Richard. At the Barren tribe, Brooke begins searching for a new idol. Blanche talks with Aisha about her old tribemates and says she feels more comfortable with the new Barren players. Blanche follows Brooke as she searches for idols. However, Brooke manages to find a new idol right under Blanche's nose.: Immunity Challenge: Tribes must remove a ladder from a pole and use it to climb over a series of obstacles. They must then retrieve poles from a high frame and use them to remove puzzle blocks from an overhead net. Finally, they must use those blocks to solve a word puzzle. The first tribe to finish wins immunity.; The Barren tribe wins immunity again. Back at Bounty, Lyndl and Richard discuss their positions on the new tribe. Keeley grows suspicious of Richard and his closeness with his former tribemates. She wants either Richard or Lyndl voted out. They plan to bring Caleb and Sally into the vote to make them feel comfortable, while continuing to leave Tez out of the discussion. At Tribal Council, Tez still feels left out of the vote. Mark subtly tries to signal to him to vote for Richard. The tribe discusses the value of loyalty and its importance moving forward. When the votes are read, Lyndl is voted out in a close 3–2–2–1 vote, with Caleb, Richard and Tez each receiving the remaining votes.
289	9	"Don't Talk Dirty to Me"	Day 18	11 March 2026
Back at the Bounty beach, Tez lets Caleb know he was told to vote for him at Tribal Council. Tez knows he is at the bottom of the tribe and tries to get on the good side of the women. Faith and Keeley notice that Mark is jealous of their position with Sally. At the Barren tribe, Aisha and some of her tribemates begin to contemplate throwing the immunity challenge to protect Richard, who is now alone on the Bounty tribe. Simon and Jackson begin to consider making a move against Aisha. They gather Ben, Brooke, and Loz to create a majority alliance called "The Beauty and the Beasts.": Individual Immunity Challenge: Players must pair up with a member of the opposite tribe. They will hold a bar over their heads while attempting to keep a ball in a chute. If the ball drops, both players are out. The last remaining pair wins individual immunity.; Simon and Faith win immunity for their respective tribes. Back at Barren, the tribe becomes suspicious of Simon and Jackson as they hold back gossip they received from the other tribe. They begin planning whether the Tribal Council will be joint or separate. The joint Tribal Council spooks Simon from making the move against Aisha. On the Bounty beach, Mark and Faith begin to worry that Richard has too many connections on the other tribe. They are split between voting for him or Tez. At Tribal Council, David informs both tribes that one representative from each tribe will compete in a fire-making challenge against one another, chosen by their tribe, with the winner earning safety for their entire tribe. Both tribes contemplate throwing the challenge to stay at Tribal Council. Mark and Simon are chosen, and Simon wins the fire-making challenge, sending the Barren tribe back to camp. Before leaving, Simon gives his immunity necklace to Richard. The Bounty tribe discusses the new dynamic now that Richard is safe, and Tez pleads with Mark and Keeley to vote out Caleb. However when the votes are read, Tez is voted out of the tribe unanimously in a 6–1 vote.
290	10	"An Oscar Winning Performance"	Days 19–20	15 March 2026
At the Barren beach, Ben feels comfortable with the "Beauty and the Beasts" alliance and hopes to vote Aisha out next. Aisha and Lottie are upset with Simon because he did not throw the fire-making challenge as they wanted in order to vote out Brooke. At the Bounty tribe, Mark and Keeley want to gather a solid group together, as Mark feels the merge is approaching. Keeley tries to get on good terms with Richard, knowing he is connected with players on the other tribe.: Reward Challenge: One member from each tribe steps up to a covered item. After looking in the box, one player must convince or persuade the other that their item is better. They can then choose to either keep their item or switch.; Caleb wins a reward of a full breakfast, Faith wins a parma, Brooke wins a tart, Richard wins a tray of lollies, Faith later wins steak, chips, and a beer, and Keeley wins tacos and a margarita. While eating her peanut butter sandwich, Blanche finds a clue to a hidden immunity idol. When they return to camp, Blanche begins searching for the idol but is unsuccessful. She asks Aisha for help, who ends up finding it for her. The two agree to keep it secret and use it when needed.: Immunity Challenge: The tribes are tethered together and must navigate through a series of obstacles. Once they reach the table maze, two members must attempt to land a ball into a chute. The first tribe to finish wins immunity.; Because the Barren tribe throws the challenge, the Bounty tribe finally wins immunity. Back at the Barren camp, Aisha and Blanche gather the numbers to send Brooke home, unaware that she has an immunity idol. Meanwhile, Simon and his alliance continue making Aisha feel safe. At Tribal Council, the tribe is excited to finally vote, as many of them have only attended a few Tribal Councils so far. The original Barren members, Brooke and Ben, feel concerned because they are in the minority. However, Brooke’s calm composure causes Cameron to reconsider voting her out. Before the votes are read, Brooke plays her immunity idol for herself, negating three votes from Aisha, Blanche, and Cameron. Aisha is then voted out in a 3–1–1 vote with Blanche's immunity idol still in her bag. Cameron and Ben receive the remaining votes from Brooke and Lottie, respectively.
291	11	"Draw Up the Divorce Papers"	Day 21	16 March 2026
At the Barren beach, Brooke and Simon are feeling on top of the tribe after blindsiding Aisha. Lottie feels played by Simon after he left her out of the vote. She and Cameron talk with Loz to see where Simon, Ben, and Jackson stand. Simon apologizes to Lottie, and they begin to repair their alliance. Lottie wants Jackson out next. Back at the Bounty tribe, Keeley and Faith secretly meet at night and discuss when to cut Mark. In the morning, Mark is worried and paranoid about the two of them.: Immunity Challenge: Tribes must climb up and over a huge ramp and free puzzle pieces from a wall. Then, they must navigate obstacles and collect a Monkey's fist, using it to reveal more puzzle pieces. Finally, tribes must complete their puzzle. The first tribe to finish wins immunity.; The Barren tribe wins immunity. Back at Bounty, Mark wants to plan to put a majority of the votes on Richard to weaken Simon come the merge. He asks Caleb to put a vote on Sally in case Richard has an idol. Caleb begins to feel tired of being used as a scapegoat for all the rogue votes. "The Three Wise Women" plan to abandon the Richard plan and shift their target to Caleb. At Tribal Council, David informs the Bounty tribe that they will not be voting to send someone home. Instead, they will vote to send three people to Redemption Beach, where those players will have to fight for their spots back in the game. The tribe discusses what needs to happen and who needs to vote where. Caleb and Sally think it is a good time to send Mark away, which Keeley is fine with. The other votes are planned to fall on Richard and Caleb. Mark hears from Caleb that Keeley is okay with him going and whispers to her not to send him to Redemption Beach. Caleb and Richard think it would be wiser to send a weaker player like Sally, in case the challenge is very physical. When the votes are read, Sally, Caleb, and Keeley are sent to Redemption Beach in a 3–2–1 vote, with Richard casting the sole vote for Keeley.
292	12	"Sitting Little Wet Sad Ducks"	Days 22–24	18 March 2026
On Redemption Beach, the trio of Caleb, Keeley, and Sally are miserable and wonder what the future holds for each of their games. Keeley finds the correct key to a box, which holds an advantage in the redemption challenge. At the Barren tribe, Mark finds a hidden immunity idol right under the noses of Faith and Richard. At the challenge, David informs the castaways that only Caleb, Keeley, and Sally will compete. The winner will rejoin the Bounty tribe, while the other two will return to Redemption Beach until the next immunity challenge. They will then join the losing tribe, where they will attend Tribal Council but each will lose their vote.: Redemption Challenge: Players must balance on a see-saw and attempt to stack blocks one at a time. Keeley has an advantage, only needing to stack four blocks, while Sally and Caleb must stack five. The first player to stack all their blocks wins their way back into the game.; Caleb wins the challenge and rejoins Bounty. Keeley and Sally return to Redemption Beach. At the Barren tribe, Simon wants to throw the next challenge in hopes of voting out Keeley and gaining Sally as an ally. At the Bounty tribe, Faith becomes even more annoyed with Caleb being back. Mark asks Simon to keep Keeley safe, but he is not sure if Simon will keep his word.: Immunity Challenge: Tribes must swim out to collect coconuts into a boat and push it back to shore. They must then attempt to land the coconuts into a basket held up by a member of the opposing tribe. The last tribe holding up both baskets wins immunity.; The Barren tribe wins immunity again. Back at Bounty, the tribe scrambles as only four members will be voting. Faith wants to vote out Caleb but is worried about Sally. Keeley and Faith worry that Sally could easily be picked up by another player once the merge happens. Mark now sees Faith as drunk with power and wants to take her out. At Tribal Council, Keeley and Sally discuss feeling like sitting ducks without votes. The tribe tries to reset and hopes to enter the merge with a clean slate. When the votes are read, there is a tie between Faith and Sally. Following the revote, Faith is voted out unanimously, 3–0.
293	13	"Shake the Game"	Days 25–26	22 March 2026
At the Bounty beach, Keeley is shocked that Mark blindsided her by taking out Faith. She knows she must be wary of him moving forward. Before the Reward Challenge, David informs the players that Barren and Bounty are no more as the tribes have merged.: Reward Challenge: Players must stand on a wobbly barrel and balance a spool in a track. If they either fall or drop the spool, they are out. The last player standing wins reward.; Sally wins the reward, a brand-new Mahindra Scorpio 4WD. The new "Togiola" tribe is given a proper merge feast to celebrate making it this far in the game. Lottie and Richard attempt to rekindle their friendship. Lottie bonds with Sally and Caleb and hopes to regain some footing in the game. Caleb looks to form new alliances and shake things up, targeting Jackson. The returnees reconnect and decide to remain loyal to each other. Keeley sees herself as a lone wolf and aims to align with Simon to target Lottie.: Immunity Challenge: Players must use a knotted rope to hold onto a heavy pole equivalent to 35% of their body weight. As time goes on, they must move further down the rope. Once a player drops their pole, they are eliminated. The last player standing wins immunity.; Brooke wins the first individual immunity challenge. Back at camp, Lottie tries to form an easy majority for the first post-merge vote. She gathers a group to split votes between Jackson and Ben. Keeley continues to sense that Lottie is too dangerous to keep in the game. She and the returnees attempt to rally votes against her, pulling in Sally, Ben, Jackson, Richard, and finally Loz. Loz and Sally question whether this is the best move for their long-term games. At Tribal Council, some players feel comfortable moving forward, though others remains a little paranoid. Lottie and Richard discuss each player's story and how this vote will reveal where everyone stands. As the discussions continue, Cameron and Lottie grow worried about the outcome. When the votes are read, Lottie is voted out in a close 9–3–1 vote, with Ben and Jackson also receiving votes.
294	14	"The Soul Collector"	Day 27–28	23 March 2026
At the Togiola beach, Caleb is upset that he was once again left out of the vote. Blanche is in the same position and pulls Sally aside to see where her head is at. The returnees and Keeley feel on top of the new tribe. Simon, Ben, and Jackson see Mark as being in control and would like to weaken him by voting Caleb out.: Immunity Challenge: The challenge is played in two stages. In the first stage, teams of six must maneuver a buoy along a rope, over a frame, through a twisted net tunnel, and attempt to land it on a high shelf. The first team to land all six buoys advances to the second stage. In this stage, players must build a ramp and roll balls along it to land them on a shelf. The first player to land all three balls on the shelf wins immunity.; Simon wins individual immunity. Back at camp, Mark wants to make it an easy vote by unanimously targeting Blanche and Cameron. However, Ben begins to question why there are still so many returnees in the game. He, Jackson, and Loz set their sights on Mark. Some of the other newbies agree and start to wonder how to approach Simon with the idea. Richard pulls Mark aside to give him a heads-up about the plan. Meanwhile, the other returnees and Keeley question whether this is the right time to make a move. Mark also begins to sense a shift before Tribal Council. At Tribal Council, the tribe discusses how it may be time to start making big moves. Mark whispers to Brooke and asks who changed the vote. Brooke suggests that some players may have "big move-itis." Mark then pulls Ben aside and flashes a fake idol to gauge how he and his allies might react. The tribe begins scrambling to decide who to vote for. Mark tells his allies that he thinks Richard is a weak ally and would rather see him go. Before the votes are read, Mark plays his real immunity idol for himself, negating seven votes from Ben, Blanche, Cameron, Jackson, Loz, Richard, and Sally. Richard is then voted out by the returnees and Keeley in a 4–1 vote and Brooke receives the lone vote from Caleb.
295	15	"Like Venomous Snakes"	Days 29–30	24 March 2026
296	16	"Arts and Crafts"	Days 31–32	29 March 2026
297	17	"Wimp"	Days 33–34	30 March 2026
298	18	"On the Rocks"	Days 35–36	1 April 2026
299	19	"Sold the Dream"	Days 37–38	5 April 2026
300	20	"Maggots"	Days 39–40	6 April 2026
301	21	"Half and Half"	Day 41	7 April 2026
302	22	"Build a Raft"	Days 42–43	12 April 2026
303	23	"You Know I've Got You"	Day 44	13 April 2026
304	24	"Redemption"	Day 45	14 April 2026

== Voting history ==
Tribal Phase (Days 1–24)

	Original Tribes						Switched Tribes						
Episode #	1	2	3	4	5	6	7	8	9	10	11	12	
Day #	2	5	7	9	11	13	15	17	18	20	21	24	
Eliminated	Daniel	Cat	Eliza	Paula	Harry	Johnson	Don	Lyndl	Tez	Aisha	Sally, Caleb & Keeley (Note: David informed the Bounty tribe at Tribal Council of Day 21 that instead of voting someone out, they would vote for three players to go to Redemption Beach where they would have to fight to earn their places back in the game.)	Tie (Note: The vote resulted in a tie. Per the rules, a second vote was held where the castaways involved in the tie would not vote and the remaining castaways could only vote for those who tied.)	Faith
Votes	11–1	7–2–2–1	8–3	7–2–1	7–1–1	7–4 (Note: Brooke played a hidden immunity idol on herself; however no votes were cast against her.)	6–2–1	3–2–2–1	6–1	4–1–1–0 (Note: Brooke played a hidden immunity idol on herself; therefore three votes against her were negated.)	3–2–1	2–2	3–0
Voter	Vote												
Caleb		Cat			Jackson (Note: Aisha used the Safety Without Power advantage and chose to save Loz from Tribal Council. She chose Caleb to cast a vote in her place.)	Johnson	Tez	Lyndl	Tez		Sally	Faith	Faith
Jackson	Daniel		Loz	Paula	Harry					Aisha			
Loz	Daniel		Eliza	Paula	Immune					Aisha			
Sally		Johnson				Johnson	Don	Richard	Tez		Caleb	None (Note: For losing the Redemption Beach Duel, Keeley and Sally were ineligible to vote at Tribal Council.)	
Keeley		Cat				Johnson	Don	Lyndl	Tez		Sally	None	
Brooke		Cat				Johnson				Cameron			
Cameron	Daniel		Eliza	Paula	Harry					~~Brooke~~			
Simon	Daniel		Eliza	Paula	Harry					Aisha			
Ben		Don				Don				Aisha			
Blanche		Sally				Don				~~Brooke~~			
Mark		Cat				Johnson	Sally	Richard	Tez		Sally	Faith	Faith
Richard	Daniel		Eliza	Paula	Harry		Don	Caleb	Tez		Keeley	Sally	Faith
Lottie	Daniel		Eliza	Paula	Harry					Ben			
Faith		Cat				Johnson	Don	Lyndl	Tez		Caleb	Sally	None (Note: Faith was not eligible to vote in the second round of voting.)
Aisha	Daniel		Eliza	Paula	Harry					~~Brooke~~			
Tez		Cat				Don	Don	Caleb	Caleb				
Lyndl	Daniel		Eliza	Jackson	Harry		Don	Tez					
Don		Cat				Johnson	Sally						
Johnson		Don				Don							
Harry	Daniel		Loz	Lyndl	Richard								
Paula	Daniel		Eliza	Lyndl									
Eliza	Daniel		Loz										
Cat		Johnson											
Daniel	Loz												

Individual Phase (Days 25–45)

	Merged Tribe												
Episode #	13	14	15	16	17	18		19	20	21	22		23
Day #	26	28	30	32	34	36		38	40	41	43		44
Eliminated	Lottie	Richard	Mark	Blanche	Ben	Tie	Simon	Cameron	Brooke	Keeley	Tie (Note: The Tribal Council vote resulted in a tie. Per the rules, the two tied contestants faced off in a fire-making challenge, with the first contestant to do so advancing to the Final 3.)	Sally	Loz
Votes	9–3–1	4–1–0 (Note: Mark played a hidden immunity idol on himself; therefore seven votes against him were negated.)	5–4–2	3–2–1–0 (Note: Keeley played a hidden immunity idol on Brooke; therefore four votes against her were negated.)	4–3–2	4–4	4–2	6–1	4–2	3–2	2–2	Challenge	1–0
Voter	Vote												
Caleb	Ben	Brooke	Mark	~~Brooke~~	Keeley	Simon	Simon	Cameron	Brooke	Keeley	Sally	Won	Loz
Jackson	Lottie	~~Mark~~	Mark	Blanche	Ben	Loz	Loz	Cameron	Caleb	Loz	Caleb		None (Note: This contestant was only able to vote for one other contestant, thus they were not eligible to vote.)
Loz	Lottie	~~Mark~~	Mark	~~Brooke~~	Keeley	Simon	None (Note: Loz was not eligible to vote in the second round of voting.)	Cameron	Brooke	Keeley	Sally		None
Sally	Lottie	~~Mark~~	Mark	~~Brooke~~	Brooke	Simon	Simon	Cameron	Brooke	Keeley	Caleb	Lost	
Keeley	Lottie	Richard	Ben	Ben	Ben	Loz	Loz	Cameron	Brooke	Loz			
Brooke	Lottie	Richard	Ben	Ben	Ben	Loz	Simon	Cameron	Caleb				
Cameron	Ben	~~Mark~~	Keeley	Blanche	Brooke	Simon	Simon	Jackson					
Simon	Lottie	Richard	Ben	~~Brooke~~	Ben	Loz	None (Note: Simon was not eligible to vote in the second round of voting.)						
Ben	Lottie	~~Mark~~	Mark	Blanche	Brooke								
Blanche	Ben	~~Mark~~	Keeley	Keeley									
Mark	Lottie	Richard	Ben										
Richard	Lottie	~~Mark~~											
Lottie	Jackson												

Final vote
Episode #	24	
Day #	45	
Finalist	Caleb	Jackson
Vote	6–3	
Juror	Vote	
Loz	Caleb	
Sally	Caleb	
Keeley	Caleb	
Brooke		Jackson
Cameron	Caleb	
Simon		Jackson
Ben		Jackson
Blanche	Caleb	
Mark	Caleb	

== Ratings ==
=== Ratings ===
Wk	Episode		Airdate	Timeslot	Overnight			7 Day Timeshift			Source
Wk	Episode		Airdate	Timeslot	Reach viewers	Total viewers	Rank	Reach viewers	Total viewers	Rank	Source
1	1	"I Forgot Your Name"	23 February 2026	Monday 7:00 pm	907,000	464,000	16	1,280,000	732,000	11	
1	2	"Ghosts"	24 February 2026	Tuesday 7:30 pm	788,000	412,000	15	1,101,000	653,000	12	
1	3	"In the Middle of Night"	25 February 2026	Wednesday 7:30 pm	747,000	365,000	16	1,084,000	629,000	12	
2	4	"Piece of Cake"	2 March 2026	Monday 7:30 pm	940,000	446,000	15	1,221,000	669,000	13	
2	5	"Urge to Do Terrible Things"	3 March 2026	Tuesday 7:30 pm	716,000	413,000	17	990,000	646,000	13	
2	6	"Operation Snuff the Weasel"	4 March 2026	Wednesday 7:30 pm	771,000	365,000	16	1,113,000	606,000	13	
3	7	"Leopards Don't Change Their Spots"	9 March 2026	Monday 7:30 pm	790,000	406,000	15	1,026,000	596,000	11	
3	8	"I Want His Pants"	10 March 2026	Tuesday 7:30 pm	653,000	360,000	19	879,000	549,000	14	
3	9	"Don't Talk Dirty to Me"	11 March 2026	Wednesday 7:30 pm	708,000	329,000	17	1,003,000	547,000	13	
4	10	"An Oscar Winning Performance"	15 March 2026	Sunday 7:00 pm	708,000	343,000	15	982,000	551,000	10	
4	11	"Draw Up the Divorce Papers"	16 March 2026	Monday 7:30 pm	694,000	393,000	24	957,000	592,000	15	
4	12	"Sitting Little Wet Sad Ducks"	18 March 2026	Wednesday 7:30 pm	764,000	375,000	15	1,051,000	596,000	14	
5	13	"Shake the Game"	22 March 2026	Sunday 7:00 pm	820,000	392,000	14	1,077,000	588,000	11	
5	14	"The Soul Collector"	23 March 2026	Monday 7:30 pm	692,000	403,000	21	953,000	608,000	14	
5	15	"Like Venomous Snakes"	24 March 2026	Tuesday 7:30 pm	730,000	394,000	18	1,024,000	611,000	14	
6	16	"Arts and Crafts"	29 March 2026	Sunday 7:00 pm	763,000	423,000	15	1,009,000	599,000	11	
6	17	"Wimp"	30 March 2026	Monday 7:30 pm	765,000	431,000	21	999,000	617,000	14	
6	18	"On the Rocks"	1 April 2026	Wednesday 7:30 pm	775,000	432,000	17	1,042,00	619,000	14	
7	19	"Sold the Dream"	5 April 2026	Sunday 7:00 pm	713,000	372,000	14	949,00	539,000	10	
7	20	"Maggots"	6 April 2026	Monday 7:30 pm	712,000	435,000	24	932,000	611,000	17	
7	21	"Half and Half"	7 April 2026	Tuesday 7:30 pm	721,000	435,000	20	961,000	624,000	13	
8	22	"Build a Raft"	12 April 2026	Sunday 7:00 pm	702,000	439,000	16	940,000	618,000	12	
8	23	"You Know I've Got You"	13 April 2026	Monday 7:30 pm	687,000	454,000	23	885,000	613,000	16	
8	24	"Redemption" (Note: The final episode was coded into two programs - the first titled "Reunion" and the second titled "Reunion". Because of this, two separate sets of ratings were produced.)	14 April 2026	Tuesday 7:30 pm	698,000	462,000	20	886,000	593,000	14	
8	24	"Redemption"	14 April 2026	Tuesday 7:30 pm	634,000	314,000	23	720,000	355,000	21	
