= Ben Davis (Australian footballer) =

Australian rules footballer (born 1997)

Personal information
- Born: 19 May 1997 (age 29)
- Original team: UNSW-Eastern Suburbs Bulldogs (Sydney AFL)/Sydney Swans Academy
- Draft: No. 75, 2016 national draft
- Debut: Round 15, 2019, Adelaide vs. Geelong, at GMHBA Stadium
- Height: 187 cm (6 ft 2 in)
- Weight: 85 kg (187 lb)
- Position: Forward

Club information
- Current club: Adelaide
- Number: 40

Playing career
Years	Club	Games (Goals)
2017–2022	Adelaide	11 (1)

Ben Davis (born 19 May 1997) is a former professional Australian rules footballer who played for the Adelaide Football Club in the Australian Football League (AFL).

== AFL career ==
Davis was drafted by the Adelaide with their final selection and 75th overall in the 2016 national draft. A member of the Sydney Swans's academy as a junior, he was ineligible to be selected by the Swans under the bidding system as he did not nominate for the AFL draft before he was 18.

Davis' brother, Abe Davis, was drafted by Sydney in 2014 and his father Graham Davis played basketball for the Sydney Kings. His father's family is part of the Kusu clan, originally from Thursday Island in the Torres Strait Islands.

In 2018 Davis was Adelaide's leading SANFL goalscorer. He was delisted in October 2022 after playing 11 AFL games.

== Personal life ==
In 2026, Davis competed on Australian Survivor: Redemption, the fourteenth season of Australian Survivor. He was eliminated on Day 33, finishing in 9th place.
