= The Traitors NZ =

New Zealand reality television series

- Also known as: The Traitors
- Genre: Reality; Game show
- Based on: De Verraders by: Marc Pos; Jasper Hoogendoorn
- Presented by: Paul Henry; Madeleine Sami
- Country of origin: New Zealand
- Original language: English
- No. of series: 3
- No. of episodes: 32

Production
- Production locations: Woodhouse Mountain Lodge, Warkworth, Auckland (season 1); Castle Claremont, Timaru, Canterbury (season 2)
- Camera setup: Multi-camera
- Running time: 59 minutes
- Production company: South Pacific Pictures

Original release
- Network: Three
- Release: 7 August 2023 – present

Related
- The Traitors Australia; International versions

The Traitors NZ is a New Zealand reality television series broadcast on Three, based on the Dutch series De Verraders.

Following the premise of other versions of De Verraders, the show features a group of contestants participating in a social deduction game similar to Mafia or Werewolf, as they stay in a luxurious heritage manor. During their stay, a small group of contestants become the titular "Traitors," and must work together to eliminate the other contestants to win a grand prize, while the remaining contestants become "Faithful" and are tasked to discover and banish the Traitors by voting them out, to win the grand prize.

The show premiered in 2023 and was originally hosted by Paul Henry for two seasons. After a year hiatus, the series returned in 2026 with comedian Madeleine Sami as the new host.

The third season coincided with a revival of the Australian version, South Pacific Pictures for Network 10. Both productions are set to share the same location, props, and feature similar missions.

== Format ==
A group of contestants arrive at a lodge where they will spend their entire time for the duration of the game. On the arrival day, the host picks at least three contestants to be called "Traitors" and the rest are automatically called "Faithful". The television audience can see who have been chosen as Traitors, but the Faithful do not know their identity.

At the end of each day, all contestants meet at a Round Table to discuss who they think are Traitors. They then cast votes that are revealed one by one. The person with the most votes reveals their identity and is immediately banished. On most nights, the Traitors meet in private and agree to "murder" one Faithful who leaves the game immediately. The remaining Faithful only know who has been murdered at breakfast next morning.

Each day, the group participates in missions to win money for the prize fund. The prize fund could reach up to $70,000 in season 1 and $100,000 from season 2. During the missions, any contestant may separately win a shield that awards that player immunity from being murdered, but not from being banished. In some cases, the contestant has the right not to disclose whether they won the shield, or to disclose it only to a restricted group.

If during the game the number of Traitors drops to two, they are given the option to "seduce" or recruit a Faithful to join them instead of murdering. Seduced Faithfuls may decline and can decide whether to tell the other Faithfuls of the attempted seduction. If only one Traitor remains, the seduction happens as a face-to-face ultimatum; if the player declines they are immediately murdered, and if they accept the pair can immediately murder another Faithful.

=== End Game ===
After the final Round Table, the remaining players (typically four) gather at the Fire of Truth and participate in the End Game. The group are given an opportunity to end the game by unanimous vote. Any vote to continue will lead to another immediate banishment vote. When a unanimous decision is reached to end the game — or when there are only two players left — the remaining players reveal whether they are Faithful or Traitors. If they are all Faithful contestants, they will share the prize fund, however, if any of these final players are Traitors then they will share the prize fund amongst themselves.

== Production ==
The announcement of a New Zealand version of The Traitors was first revealed on 3 November 2022. The first season featured a cast evenly split between celebrities and civilians.

On 1 December 2023, The Traitors NZ was officially renewed for a second season, set to film in 2024, with Henry reprising his role as host. Unlike the first season, the second would feature an all-civilian cast.

On 30 September 2024, both seasons were removed from Three's streaming platform, ThreeNow. While no official reason was given, the removal likely stemmed from the broader financial crisis affecting New Zealand's television industry, which had resulted in the cancellation of all domestic reality programming.

As of August 2025, season 2 remains legally accessible only via South Pacific Pictures’ YouTube channel for New Zealand viewers. Both seasons are also available internationally through Australia's 10 Streaming, Canada's Crave and the UK's BBC iPlayer.

It was confirmed on 7 August 2025, that The Traitors NZ had been renewed for a third season, with the casting for new contestants opened shortly after the announcement. Henry chose not to continue as host due to his new role as a board member for TVNZ. The production team also became the producers of the Australian version, with Castle Claremont, In Timaru, Canterbury acting as a production hub for both Australian and New Zealand versions (similar to Ardross Castle in Scotland for the American and British versions), with the hopes that the site will also host other versions, particularly for countries in the Asia–Pacific region. In October 2025, comedian Madeleine Sami was announced as the new host.

== Series overview ==
Series overview
Series	Contestants	Host	Episodes	Originally released		Winner(s)	Prize	Traitors
Series	Contestants	Host	Episodes	First released	Last released	Winner(s)	Prize	Traitors
1	19	Paul Henry	10	7 August 2023	5 September 2023	Anna Reeve; Sam Smith (Faithfuls)	NZ$59,100 (out of $70,000)	Matt Heath; Loryn Reynolds; Dan Sing; Brooke Howard-Smith (from ep. 4); Robbie Bell (from ep. 6); Colin Mathura-Jeffree (from ep. 7)
2	22	Paul Henry	12	1 July 2024	5 August 2024	Bailey Kench (Traitor)	NZ$73,000 (out of $100,000)	Mike Adams; Whitney Greene; Jane Massey; Jackie Pope (from ep. 1); Bailey Kench (from ep. 8); Siale Tunoka (from ep. 9); Ben Porter (from ep. 10)
3	21	Madeleine Sami	10	31 May 2026	29 June 2026	Chloe Withrington (Traitor)	NZ$75,000 (out of $100,000)	Jill Braithwaite; Keanu Feleti; Bradley Ogg (from ep. 2); James Brown (from ep. 5); Chloe Withrington (from ep. 9)

=== Season 1 ===
The Traitors NZ season 1 episodes
No. overall	No. in season	Title	Original release date
1	1	"Episode 1"	7 August 2023
2	2	"Episode 2"	8 August 2023
3	3	"Episode 3"	14 August 2023
4	4	"Episode 4"	15 August 2023
5	5	"Episode 5"	21 August 2023
6	6	"Episode 6"	22 August 2023
7	7	"Episode 7"	28 August 2023
8	8	"Episode 8"	29 August 2023
9	9	"Episode 9"	4 September 2023
10	10	"Episode 10"	5 September 2023

=== Season 2 ===
The Traitors NZ season 2 episodes
No. overall	No. in season	Title	Original release date
11	1	"Episode 1"	1 July 2024
12	2	"Episode 2"	1 July 2024
13	3	"Episode 3"	8 July 2024
14	4	"Episode 4"	8 July 2024
15	5	"Episode 5"	15 July 2024
16	6	"Episode 6"	15 July 2024
17	7	"Episode 7"	22 July 2024
18	8	"Episode 8"	22 July 2024
19	9	"Episode 9"	29 July 2024
20	10	"Episode 10"	29 July 2024
21	11	"Episode 11"	5 August 2024
22	12	"Episode 12"	5 August 2024

=== Season 3 ===
The Traitors NZ season 3 episodes
No. overall	No. in season	Title	Original release date
23	1	"Episode 1"	31 May 2026
24	2	"Episode 2"	1 June 2026
25	3	"Episode 3"	7 June 2026
26	4	"Episode 4"	8 June 2026
27	5	"Episode 5"	14 June 2026
28	6	"Episode 6"	15 June 2026
29	7	"Episode 7"	21 June 2026
30	8	"Episode 8"	22 June 2026
31	9	"Episode 9"	28 June 2026
32	10	"Episode 10"	29 June 2026

== See also ==
Other versions

- The Traitors Australia
- The Traitors Canada
- The Traitors Ireland
- The Traitors UK
- The Traitors US
