= The Traitors NZ season 3 =

New Zealand television series season

The Traitors NZ
- Season 3
- Promotional poster
- Presented by: Madeleine Sami
- No. of contestants: 21
- Winner: Chloe Withrington
- Runner-up: Maruia Jensen
- Location: Castle Claremont, Timaru, Canterbury
- No. of episodes: 10

Release
- Original network: Three
- Original release: 31 May – 29 June 2026

Season chronology
- ← Previous; Season 2

The third season of the New Zealand television series The Traitors NZ premiered on Three on 31 May 2026. The season was won by Chloe Withrington, as a traitor, with Maruia Jensen, placing as runner-up, as a faithful.

== Production ==
Following the second season of The Traitors NZ, the series was cancelled. However, in late 2025, series was greenlit for a third ten-episode season with Paul Henry set to return as host. On 8 August 2025, it was announced that Henry would in fact not return as host. On 29 September 2025, a new host was revealed to be comedian and Taskmaster NZ alum Madeleine Sami. The series featured twenty-one new players ready to play the game. The first promotional trailer was released on 8 May 2026.

== Format ==
The contestants arrived at the castle and are referred to as the "Faithful". Among them are the "Traitors", a group of contestants secretly selected by the host, Madeleine Sami. Each night, the Traitors would decide who to "murder" and that same contestant would leave the game. After the end of each day, where the contestants participated in various challenges to add money to the prize fund, they would participate in the Round Table, where they must decide who to banish from the game, trying to identify the Traitor.

If all the remaining players are Faithful, then the prize money is divided evenly among them. However, if any Traitors remain, they win the entire pot.

== Contestants ==
Like the second season, this cast is made up of a complete new cast.

List of The Traitors NZ season 3 contestants
Contestant	Age	Residence	Occupation	Affiliation	Finish
Rachael King	55	Christchurch	Author	Faithful	Murdered (Episode 2)
Ryan Fairweather	24	Auckland	Audio engineer	Faithful	Banished (Episode 3)
Jannaia Fuimaono	27	Wellington	Personal trainer	Faithful	Murdered (Episode 3)
Kate Laidler	20	Auckland	Actress	Faithful	Banished (Episode 3)
Elliott Lam	32	Wellington	Comedian	Faithful	Murdered (Episode 4)
Bradley Ogg	27	Auckland	Youth Pastor	Traitor (Note: Ogg chose to become a Traitor in Episode 2.)	Banished (Episode 4)
Jill Braithwaite	50	Nelson	Receptionist	Traitor	Banished (Episode 5)
Michael Meharg	44	Auckland	Bakery manager	Faithful (Note: Meharg was originally eliminated before roles were assigned but was able to buy himself back into the game.)	Murdered (Episode 6)
Harrison Ryder	36	Täby, Sweden	Office manager	Faithful	Banished (Episode 6)
Dave Ward	48	Nelson	Sports announcer	Faithful	Murdered (Episode 7)
Aroha Noanoa	32	Auckland	HR consultant	Faithful	Banished (Episode 7)
Samantha Richards	31	Queenstown	Teacher	Faithful	Murdered (Episode 8)
James Brown	49	Auckland	TV captioner	Traitor (Note: Brown was recruited as a Traitor in Episode 5.)	Banished (Episode 8)
Maria Williams	36	Wellington	Teacher	Faithful	Murdered (Episode 9)
Hannah Kremmer	31	Motueka	Stay-at-home mum	Faithful	Banished (Episode 9)
Aaron Fleming	42	Queenstown	Triathlete	Faithful	Murdered (Episode 10)
Keanu Feleti	30	Auckland	DJ	Traitor	Banished (Episode 10)
Violette Perry	20	Auckland	Athlete	Faithful	Banished (Episode 10)
Debbie Ryder	65	Wellington	Lecturer	Faithful	Banished (Episode 10)
Maruia Jensen	43	Tokoroa	Teacher	Faithful	Runner-up (Episode 10)
Chloe Withrington	31	Auckland	Business owner	Traitor (Note: Withrington was recruited as a Traitor in Episode 9.)	Winner (Episode 10)

== Episodes ==
The Traitors NZ season 3 episodes
No. overall	No. in season	Title	Original release date
23	1	"Episode 1"	31 May 2026
24	2	"Episode 2"	1 June 2026
25	3	"Episode 3"	7 June 2026
26	4	"Episode 4"	8 June 2026
27	5	"Episode 5"	14 June 2026
28	6	"Episode 6"	15 June 2026
29	7	"Episode 7"	21 June 2026
30	8	"Episode 8"	22 June 2026
31	9	"Episode 9"	28 June 2026
32	10	"Episode 10"	29 June 2026

== Elimination history ==
Key

The contestant was a Faithful.
The contestant was a Traitor.

Episode	1	2		3	4	5	6		7	8		9		10
Traitors' decision	None	Rachael		Jannaia	Elliot	James	Michael	Chloe; Dave; Hannah; Samantha	Dave	Samantha		Chloe	Maria	Aaron
Traitors' decision	None	Murder				Seduce (Note: In Episode 5, the Traitors were given the opportunity to seduce a Faithful. The Faithful would then have the opportunity to accept or decline. The Traitors chose James, and he accepted the offer.)	Murder	Death Match (Note: In Episode 6, the Traitors were given the tasked to hand select four players for a death match. They chose Chloe, Dave, Hannah and Samantha. All player were given cards with only one being a life card. After switching, the player holding the life card would earn safety. After three rounds the player without the life card would be murdered. As the loser of the game, Dave was murdered in episode 7.)	Murder			Ultimatum (Note: Following James' banishment, Keanu was offered the chance to meet a Faithful face-to-face and offer them an ultimatum: become a Traitor or be Murdered. He chose Chloe, who accepted the offer.)	Murder	
Shield	Aaron; Aroha; Dave; Harrison; Jannaia; Keanu; Violette	None		Maria; Kate	All (Note: The players successfully completed the mission by obtaining the correct stamp, preventing the Traitors from committing a murder.)	Aroha; Hannah; Maria; Samantha; Violette	Aaron; Maria		Aroha; Maruia	None				
Banishment	None	Tie (Note: The first round of voting resulted in a tie. Per the rules, a second vote was held where the players involved in the tie would not vote and the remaining players could only vote for those who tied.)	Ryan	Kate	Bradley	Jill	Harrison		Aroha	James		Hannah		Keanu
Vote	None	6–6–3–2–2	9–8	14–2–1–1	9–4–1–1–1	9–4–1–1	9–3–1		7–3–1	4–3–2–1		5–1–1		3–1–1
Chloe	No vote	Ryan	Ryan	Kate	Bradley	Jill	Harrison		Aroha	James		Violette		Debbie
Maruia	No vote	Harrison	Elliot	Kate	Debbie	Dave	Dave		Debbie	James	James (Note: Maruia won the Dagger in a daily challenge, making her vote count twice at the roundtable.)	Hannah		Keanu
Debbie	No vote	Aaron	Elliot	Samantha	Chloe	Jill	Harrison		Hannah	James		Hannah		Keanu
Violette	No vote	Elliot	Ryan	Kate	Bradley	Aroha	Chloe		Aroha	Chloe		Hannah		Keanu
Keanu	No vote	Ryan	Ryan	Kate	Bradley	Jill	Harrison		Aroha	Hannah		Hannah		Maruia
Aaron	No vote	Harrison	Elliot	Kate	Bradley	Jill	Harrison		Aroha	Chloe		Hannah		Murdered (Episode 10)
Hannah	No vote	Aaron	Ryan	Kate	Debbie	Jill	Harrison		Debbie	Keanu		Keanu		Banished (Episode 9)
Maria	No vote	Ryan	Ryan	Kate	Bradley	Jill	Harrison		Aroha	Keanu		Murdered (Episode 9)		
James	No vote	Ryan	Ryan	Jill	Debbie	Jill	Harrison		Aroha	Chloe		Banished (Episode 8)		
Samantha	No vote	Ryan	Ryan	Kate	Bradley	Aroha	Harrison		Aroha	Murdered (Episode 8)				
Aroha	No vote	Elliot	Elliot	Kate	Dave	Jill	Harrison		Debbie	Banished (Episode 7)				
Dave	No vote	Elliot	Elliot	Kate	Bradley	Jill	Chloe		Murdered (Episode 7)					
Harrison	No vote	Elliot	Ryan	Kate	Bradley	Aroha	Chloe		Banished (Episode 6)					
Michael	Eliminated (Episode 1) (Note: Elliot, Hannah, Jannaia, Michael, Rachael, and Ryan chose to step out their cars before entering. After they did, the group was told that one of them needed to leave the game in exchange for a reward of NZ$5,000. Michael left the game with the reward.)			Jill	Debbie	Aroha	Murdered (Episode 6)							
Jill	No vote	Elliot	Elliot	Kate	Bradley	Harrison	Banished (Episode 5)							
Bradley	No vote	Elliot	Ryan	Kate	Jill	Banished (Episode 4)								
Elliot	No vote	Dave	No; Vote	Kate	Murdered (Episode 4)									
Kate	No vote	Ryan	Elliot	Harrison	Banished (Episode 3)									
Jannaia	No vote	Aaron	Elliot	Murdered (Episode 3)										
Ryan	No vote	Dave	No; Vote	Banished (Episode 3)										
Rachael	No vote	Murdered (Episode 2)												

=== End game ===
Episode	10				
Decision	Banish	Violette	Banish	Debbie	Game Over; Traitor Win
Vote	4–0	2–1–1	3–0	2–1	Game Over; Traitor Win
Chloe	Banish	Debbie	Banish	Debbie	Winner
Maruia	Banish	Violette	Banish	Debbie	Runner-up
Debbie	Banish	Violette	Banish	Chloe	Banished
Violette	Banish	Chloe	Banished		

== Missions ==
Episode	Task description	Time limit	Money earned	Money available	Running total	Shield winner(s)
1	Players must carry a palanquin along a path collecting money at various points. They must return it within the timeframe and leave players behind. The players who return earned shields.	30 minutes	NZ$12,000	NZ$12,000	NZ$12,000 (of NZ$12,000)	Aaron
1	Players must carry a palanquin along a path collecting money at various points. They must return it within the timeframe and leave players behind. The players who return earned shields.	30 minutes	NZ$12,000	NZ$12,000	NZ$12,000 (of NZ$12,000)	Aroha
1	Players must carry a palanquin along a path collecting money at various points. They must return it within the timeframe and leave players behind. The players who return earned shields.	30 minutes	NZ$12,000	NZ$12,000	NZ$12,000 (of NZ$12,000)	Dave
1	Players must carry a palanquin along a path collecting money at various points. They must return it within the timeframe and leave players behind. The players who return earned shields.	30 minutes	NZ$12,000	NZ$12,000	NZ$12,000 (of NZ$12,000)	Harrison
1	Players must carry a palanquin along a path collecting money at various points. They must return it within the timeframe and leave players behind. The players who return earned shields.	30 minutes	NZ$12,000	NZ$12,000	NZ$12,000 (of NZ$12,000)	Jannaia
1	Players must carry a palanquin along a path collecting money at various points. They must return it within the timeframe and leave players behind. The players who return earned shields.	30 minutes	NZ$12,000	NZ$12,000	NZ$12,000 (of NZ$12,000)	Keanu
1	Players must carry a palanquin along a path collecting money at various points. They must return it within the timeframe and leave players behind. The players who return earned shields.	30 minutes	NZ$12,000	NZ$12,000	NZ$12,000 (of NZ$12,000)	Violette
2	Six teams of three players must answer true or false about a player within their group. If the answer correctly money would be added to the prize pot. If they answered incorrectly, they would be fall into a pit of slime.	No time limit	NZ4,500	NZ$9,000	NZ$16,500 (of NZ$21,000)	No Shield on offer
3	Players must find silver hidden within a room. They must keep the silver from an intruder. Any silver found and hidden will from the intruder be added to the prize part.	No time limit	NZ$11,500	NZ$14,000 (Note: Michael was offered to buy his way back into the game. The cost was his NZ$2,500 he collected from the challenge and NZ$5,000 he received before the game began. He chose to add the total to the prize pot.)	NZ$28,000 (of NZ$35,000)	Maria
3	Players must find silver hidden within a room. They must keep the silver from an intruder. Any silver found and hidden will from the intruder be added to the prize part.	No time limit	NZ$11,500	NZ$14,000	NZ$28,000 (of NZ$35,000)	Kate
4	Three teams of players must search three different rooms for three Traitors stamps. If the correct stamp is found all players would be shielded from murder.	7 minutes	NZ$6,000	NZ$9,000	NZ$34,000 (of NZ$44,000)	Aaron
4	Three teams of players must search three different rooms for three Traitors stamps. If the correct stamp is found all players would be shielded from murder.	7 minutes	NZ$6,000	NZ$9,000	NZ$34,000 (of NZ$44,000)	Aroha
4	Three teams of players must search three different rooms for three Traitors stamps. If the correct stamp is found all players would be shielded from murder.	7 minutes	NZ$6,000	NZ$9,000	NZ$34,000 (of NZ$44,000)	Bradley
4	Three teams of players must search three different rooms for three Traitors stamps. If the correct stamp is found all players would be shielded from murder.	7 minutes	NZ$6,000	NZ$9,000	NZ$34,000 (of NZ$44,000)	Chloe
4	Three teams of players must search three different rooms for three Traitors stamps. If the correct stamp is found all players would be shielded from murder.	7 minutes	NZ$6,000	NZ$9,000	NZ$34,000 (of NZ$44,000)	Dave
4	Three teams of players must search three different rooms for three Traitors stamps. If the correct stamp is found all players would be shielded from murder.	7 minutes	NZ$6,000	NZ$9,000	NZ$34,000 (of NZ$44,000)	Debbie
4	Three teams of players must search three different rooms for three Traitors stamps. If the correct stamp is found all players would be shielded from murder.	7 minutes	NZ$6,000	NZ$9,000	NZ$34,000 (of NZ$44,000)	Hannah
4	Three teams of players must search three different rooms for three Traitors stamps. If the correct stamp is found all players would be shielded from murder.	7 minutes	NZ$6,000	NZ$9,000	NZ$34,000 (of NZ$44,000)	Harrison
4	Three teams of players must search three different rooms for three Traitors stamps. If the correct stamp is found all players would be shielded from murder.	7 minutes	NZ$6,000	NZ$9,000	NZ$34,000 (of NZ$44,000)	James
4	Three teams of players must search three different rooms for three Traitors stamps. If the correct stamp is found all players would be shielded from murder.	7 minutes	NZ$6,000	NZ$9,000	NZ$34,000 (of NZ$44,000)	Jill
4	Three teams of players must search three different rooms for three Traitors stamps. If the correct stamp is found all players would be shielded from murder.	7 minutes	NZ$6,000	NZ$9,000	NZ$34,000 (of NZ$44,000)	Keanu
4	Three teams of players must search three different rooms for three Traitors stamps. If the correct stamp is found all players would be shielded from murder.	7 minutes	NZ$6,000	NZ$9,000	NZ$34,000 (of NZ$44,000)	Maria
4	Three teams of players must search three different rooms for three Traitors stamps. If the correct stamp is found all players would be shielded from murder.	7 minutes	NZ$6,000	NZ$9,000	NZ$34,000 (of NZ$44,000)	Maruia
4	Three teams of players must search three different rooms for three Traitors stamps. If the correct stamp is found all players would be shielded from murder.	7 minutes	NZ$6,000	NZ$9,000	NZ$34,000 (of NZ$44,000)	Michael
4	Three teams of players must search three different rooms for three Traitors stamps. If the correct stamp is found all players would be shielded from murder.	7 minutes	NZ$6,000	NZ$9,000	NZ$34,000 (of NZ$44,000)	Samantha
4	Three teams of players must search three different rooms for three Traitors stamps. If the correct stamp is found all players would be shielded from murder.	7 minutes	NZ$6,000	NZ$9,000	NZ$34,000 (of NZ$44,000)	Violette
5	The players were separated into three groups. Each room contained a button and a telephone. The first team to press its button would earn NZ$5,000 and shields for their team. If a second team pressed its button, an additional NZ$5,000 would be added to the prize pot, and that team would receive the shields instead. However, if a third team pressed its button, all of the money would be lost, though that team would still earn the shields.	10 minutes	NZ$10,000	NZ$10,000	NZ$44,000 (of NZ$54,000)	Aroha
5	The players were separated into three groups. Each room contained a button and a telephone. The first team to press its button would earn NZ$5,000 and shields for their team. If a second team pressed its button, an additional NZ$5,000 would be added to the prize pot, and that team would receive the shields instead. However, if a third team pressed its button, all of the money would be lost, though that team would still earn the shields.	10 minutes	NZ$10,000	NZ$10,000	NZ$44,000 (of NZ$54,000)	Hannah
5	The players were separated into three groups. Each room contained a button and a telephone. The first team to press its button would earn NZ$5,000 and shields for their team. If a second team pressed its button, an additional NZ$5,000 would be added to the prize pot, and that team would receive the shields instead. However, if a third team pressed its button, all of the money would be lost, though that team would still earn the shields.	10 minutes	NZ$10,000	NZ$10,000	NZ$44,000 (of NZ$54,000)	Maria
5	The players were separated into three groups. Each room contained a button and a telephone. The first team to press its button would earn NZ$5,000 and shields for their team. If a second team pressed its button, an additional NZ$5,000 would be added to the prize pot, and that team would receive the shields instead. However, if a third team pressed its button, all of the money would be lost, though that team would still earn the shields.	10 minutes	NZ$10,000	NZ$10,000	NZ$44,000 (of NZ$54,000)	Samantha
5	The players were separated into three groups. Each room contained a button and a telephone. The first team to press its button would earn NZ$5,000 and shields for their team. If a second team pressed its button, an additional NZ$5,000 would be added to the prize pot, and that team would receive the shields instead. However, if a third team pressed its button, all of the money would be lost, though that team would still earn the shields.	10 minutes	NZ$10,000	NZ$10,000	NZ$44,000 (of NZ$54,000)	Violette
6	Players were tasked with reassembling effigies of themselves. Each completed effigy added NZ$700 to the prize pot. The effigy that was completed first, third, and twelfth that player earned a shield.	30 minutes	NZ$7,700	NZ$9,100	NZ$51,700 (of NZ$63,100)	Aaron
6	Players were tasked with reassembling effigies of themselves. Each completed effigy added NZ$700 to the prize pot. The effigy that was completed first, third, and twelfth that player earned a shield.	30 minutes	NZ$7,700	NZ$9,100	NZ$51,700 (of NZ$63,100)	Maria
