= The Traitors NZ season 1 =

New Zealand television series season

The Traitors NZ
- Season 1
- Promotional poster
- Presented by: Paul Henry
- No. of contestants: 19
- Winners: Anna Reeve; Sam Smith
- Runner-up: Brooke Howard-Smith
- Location: Woodhouse Mountain Lodge, Warkworth, Auckland
- No. of episodes: 10

Release
- Original network: Three
- Original release: 7 August – 5 September 2023

Season chronology
- Next → Season 2

The first season of the New Zealand television series The Traitors NZ premiered on Three on 7 August 2023. The season was won by Anna Reeve and Sam Smith, as faithfuls, with Brooke Howard-Smith, placing as runner-up, as a traitor.

== Production ==
The first season of The Traitors NZ featured celebrities competing alongside members of the general public.

== Format ==
The contestants arrived at the castle and are referred to as the "Faithful". Among them are the "Traitors", a group of contestants secretly selected by the host, Paul Henry. Each night, the Traitors would decide who to "murder" and that same contestant would leave the game. After the end of each day, where the contestants participated in various challenges to add money to the prize fund, they would participate in the Round Table, where they must decide who to banish from the game, trying to identify the Traitor.

If all the remaining players are Faithful, then the prize money is divided evenly among them. However, if any Traitors remain, they win the entire pot.

== Contestants ==
The contestants were divided by half being celebrities and the other half being regular people.

List of The Traitors NZ contestants
Contestant	Age	Residence	Occupation	Affiliation	Finish
Sam Johnson	27	Christchurch	Gamer	None	Bribed (Episode 1)
Kimberly Stewart	38	Auckland	Psychic	Faithful	Murdered (Episode 2)
Loryn Reynolds	28	Auckland	Ballroom dancer	Traitor	Banished (Episode 2)
Christen Oliveira	27	Auckland	Influencer	Faithful	Murdered (Episode 3)
Mike Puru	47	Auckland	Broadcaster	Faithful	Banished (Episode 3)
Matt Heath	51	Auckland	Radio Hauraki breakfast host	Traitor	Banished (Episode 4)
Brodie Kane	36	Auckland	Broadcaster	Faithful	Murdered (Episode 5)
Fili Tapa	42	Auckland	Influencer	Faithful	Banished (Episode 5)
Robbie Bell	50	Christchurch	Hairsylist	Traitor (Note: Bell was recruited as a Traitor in Episode 6.)	Banished (Episode 6)
Dylan Reeve	43	Auckland	Writer	Faithful	Murdered (Episode 7)
Dan Sing	48	Auckland	Poker player	Traitor	Banished (Episode 7)
Justine Smith	54	Te Atatū Peninsula	Comedian	Faithful	Murdered (Episode 8)
Vanda Symon	54	Dunedin	Crime writer	Faithful	Banished (Episode 8)
Kings	33	Auckland	Musician	Faithful	Banished (Episode 9)
Colin Mathura-Jeffree	51	Auckland	Model	Traitor (Note: Mathura-Jeffree was recruited as a Traitor in Episode 7.)	Banished (Episode 10)
Julia Vahry	37	Hamilton	Former police officer	Faithful	Banished (Episode 10)
Brooke Howard-Smith	50	Auckland	Entrepreneur	Traitor (Note: Howard-Smith was recruited as a Traitor in Episode 4.)	Banished (Episode 10)
Anna Reeve	36	Auckland	Model	Faithful	Winner (Episode 10)
Sam Smith	37	Auckland	Comedian	Faithful	Winner (Episode 10)

== Episodes ==
The Traitors NZ season 1 episodes
No. overall	No. in season	Title	Original release date
1	1	"Episode 1"	7 August 2023
2	2	"Episode 2"	8 August 2023
3	3	"Episode 3"	14 August 2023
4	4	"Episode 4"	15 August 2023
5	5	"Episode 5"	21 August 2023
6	6	"Episode 6"	22 August 2023
7	7	"Episode 7"	28 August 2023
8	8	"Episode 8"	29 August 2023
9	9	"Episode 9"	4 September 2023
10	10	"Episode 10"	5 September 2023

== Elimination history ==
Key

The contestant was a Faithful.
The contestant was a Traitor.

Episode	1	2	3	4	5	6	7	8		9	10
Traitors' decision	None	Kimberly	Christen	Brooke	Brodie	Robbie	Dylan	Colin	Justine	~~Anna~~ (Note: At the end of episode 8, the Traitors decided to murder Anna. However, Anna secretly had won a shield during the previous mission and was spared from elimination.)	None
Traitors' decision	None	Murder		Seduce (Note: Instead of choosing to murder a player, the Traitors decided to offer Brooke the opportunity to become a Traitor. He accepted their offer.)	Murder	Seduce (Note: Instead of choosing to murder a player, the Traitors decided to offer Robbie the opportunity to become a Traitor. She accepted their offer.)	Murder	Ultimatum (Note: Following Dan's banishment, Brooke was offered the chance to recruit a faithful to become a Traitor. He chose Colin, who accepted the offer. They could also commit a murder during the night.)	Murder		None
Shields	None			Robbie	Fili	Robbie	Dan	None	Anna	None	
Banishment	Sam J	Loryn	Mike	Matt	Fili	Robbie	Dan	Vanda		Kings	Colin
Vote	Bribed (Note: Sam J decided to take the bribe Paul offered and leave the game.)	13–1–1– 1–1	8–3–2–2	6–4–3–1	9–1–1–1	9–1–1	5–4	5–1–1		3–2–1	3–2
Anna	No; Vote	Loryn	Mike	Matt	Fili	Kings	Dan	Vanda		Kings	Colin
Sam S.	No; Vote	Loryn	Mike	Matt	Fili	Robbie	Dan	Vanda		Kings	Colin
Brooke	No; Vote	Loryn	Mike	Robbie	Sam S.	Robbie	Vanda	Vanda		Julia	Colin
Julia	No; Vote	Loryn	Mike	Matt	Fili	Robbie	Dan	Vanda		Anna	Brooke
Colin	No; Vote	Vanda	Mike	Matt	Fili	Robbie	Dan	Vanda		Kings	Brooke
Kings	No; Vote	Loryn	Julia	Julia	Fili	Robbie	Vanda	Colin		Julia	Banished (Episode 9)
Vanda	No; Vote	Christen	Colin	Fili	Fili	Robbie	Dan	Kings		Banished (Episode 8)	
Justine	No; Vote	Loryn	Mike	Robbie	Fili	Robbie	Vanda	Murdered (Episode 8)			
Dan	No; Vote	Loryn	Dylan	Julia	Vanda	Robbie	Vanda	Banished (Episode 7)			
Dylan	No; Vote	Loryn	Mike	Matt	Fili	Robbie	Murdered (Episode 7)				
Robbie	No; Vote	Loryn	Dylan	Julia	Fili	Julia	Banished (Episode 6)				
Fili	No; Vote	Loryn	Julia	Robbie	Robbie	Banished (Episode 5)					
Brodie	No; Vote	Loryn	Mike	Matt	Murdered (Episode 5)						
Matt	No; Vote	Colin	Colin	Julia	Banished (Episode 4)						
Mike	No; Vote	Loryn	Colin	Banished (Episode 3)							
Christen	No; Vote	Loryn	Murdered (Episode 3)								
Loryn	No; Vote	Dylan	Banished (Episode 2)								
Kimberly	No; Vote	Murdered (Episode 2)									
Sam J.	Bribed (Episode 1)										

=== End game ===
Episode	10				
Decision	Banish	Julia	Banish	Brooke	Game Over; Faithfuls Win
Vote	4–0	3–1	3–0	2–1	Game Over; Faithfuls Win
Anna	Banish	Julia	Banish	Brooke	Winners
Sam S.	Banish	Julia	Banish	Brooke	Winners
Brooke	Banish	Julia	Banish	Anna	Banished
Julia	Banish	Anna	Banished		

== Missions ==
Episode	Task description	Time limit	Money earned	Money available	Running total	Shield winner(s)
1	The secret mission was for the traitors to sink a ball of seven in a standard round of pool table at the night mixer. For every traitor to do so, they would earn NZ$1,000. The official Mission challenges everyone to find 4 silver coins in 7 minutes. For every coin, they would earn NZ$1,000.	45 minutes --- 7 minutes	NZ$5,000	NZ$7,000	NZ$5,000 (of NZ$7,000)	No Shield on offer
2	The players are split into two teams after entering a church full of masked people. One person from each team at a time would enter a confessional booth to hear a riddle from Paul. As the teams have to solve the answer, it connects them to random people in the church. For every correctly identified item, the players would earn NZ$1,000 for the pot.	—N/a	NZ$5,000	NZ$6,000	NZ$10,000 (of NZ$13,000)	No Shield on offer
3	The players were split into two teams. One team would head to a music room while the other team would be in the garden trying to find the sculpture that corresponds to a music box. To prove which is which, the players would send a photo to Paul. For every right statue, they would earn NZ$1,500 to the pot.	7 Minutes	NZ$4,500	NZ$4,500	NZ$14,500 (of NZ$17,500)	No Shield on offer
4	The players were split into three teams. The teams are sent into Christen's former room to memorize the objects in the room before the ghostly visit where items would be changed. Players had 1 minute to locate 5 objects that were changed, each correctly identified item earns NZ$300 for the prize fund, and the team who find the most objects gain access to the armoury for a possible shield.	1 minute per team	NZ$2,100	NZ$4,500	NZ$16,600 (of NZ$22,000)	Robbie
5	The players had to transport buckets of wine to Paul who was standing on the top of a nearby hill. As they climbed the hill, they would pass several buckets that were valued between NZ$100 and NZ$750. The heavier the bucket, the harder to transport and the buckets all mut have a wine level above a white line before making it across the finish line. The first three buckets to cross the finish line earn whoever is carrying them, a maximum of two people per bucket, a trip to the Armoury for a chance at the shield.	20 minutes	NZ$5,000	NZ$5,000	NZ$21,600 (of NZ$27,000)	Fili
6	The players had to split into 3 teams separating by color. Each team would nominate one person who would enter a sheep pen where they would have to find out a specific sheep's name from a description from a mugshot. Once the player in the pen learned the name, the team would have to pin a rosette to the mugshot and ring a bell. The team who did it the fastest will win NZ$2,500 for the pot. This is played in three rounds and the team who identified the most would win a chance to enter the armoury for the entire team.	—N/a	NZ$7,500	NZ$7,500	NZ$29,100 (of NZ$34,500)	Robbie
7	Three random players are picked by the traitors to be "kidnapped" and the rest have to find them within an hour. Those kidnapped are taken to a boat shed by the lake. Those searching for them have to solve trivial questions about the others which would form coordinates on a map to help them find and unlock the door. The first team to find them wins NZ$8,000 for the pot and a trip to the armoury.	1 hour	NZ$8,000	NZ$8,000	NZ$37,100 (of NZ$42,500)	Dan
8	The players are split into pairs and a solo player before sitting opposite each other on chairs in a room blindfolded. When the lights are turned off, they remove the blindfold and start counting while scary sounds and noises are played to distract them. In order to win the mission, players must count a total of 13 minutes and 13 seconds as close as possible, with a max of 60 seconds off. The closest to that number earns NZ$2,000 to the pot and the most accurate count earns a trip to the armoury for a shield.	various per team	NZ$4,000	NZ$8,000	NZ$41,100 (of NZ$50,500)	Anna
9	The players have to make their way across a laser-filled room with artifacts to Paul. After every successful attempt, more lasers are added. However, if someone sets off a laser,one minute is removed from the clock.	13 minutes	NZ$6,000	NZ$7,500	NZ$47,100 (of NZ$58,000)	No Shield on offer
10	The players are taken to different locations across Auckland where they would have to participate in 5 Fear Factor-inspired tasks. Brooke had to sit in a tub with bugs poured on him; Anna had to get a traitors tattoo, Julia had to submerge herself in a cryotherapy chamber for at least 3 minutes at a temperature of -140oC minimum, Sam had to get a "monk" haircut, and Colin had to eat heart, a tongue and an eyeball of something. If 4 and only 4 players manage to complete the task and 1 person does not do it, the group will win NZ$12,000 into the final prize pot.	Various per challenge	NZ$12,000	NZ$12,000	NZ$59,100 (of NZ$70,000)	No Shield on offer
