= Sam Smith (comedian) =

New Zealand comedian and author

- Born: Christchurch, New Zealand

Sam Smith is a New Zealand comedian and writer. He has worked in New Zealand television comedy, including on 7 Days and Taskmaster NZ. In 2023, he was a co-winner of the first season of The Traitors NZ.

== Early life and dentistry ==
Smith was born in 1984/1985 in Christchurch, New Zealand. He first began writing comedy while studying dentistry at Otago University in Dunedin, and after graduation moved to Auckland, where he split his time working as a dentist and as a comedy writer for Jono and Ben. Smith moved into a full-time career in comedy and writing, after he was diagnosed with multiple sclerosis in 2015, and in 2017, vision loss in his left eye and partially in his right eye left him legally blind.

== Comedy and television ==
Smith has worked as a stand-up comedian, comedy writer, television audience warm-up performer and presenter in New Zealand. His television work has included writing for and appearing on comedy panel show 7 Days, as well as working as a writer on Taskmaster New Zealand and Wellington Paranormal.

Smith performed in the 2015 New Zealand Comedy Festival with his stand-up show Laughing Gas, which drew on his experiences as both a dentist and comedian. Dione Joseph, for Theatreview, described the show as "funny, warm and engaging".

In 2023, Smith competed in the first season of The Traitors NZ. He won the season as a "Faithful" alongside Anna Reeve.

== Writing ==
Smith is the author of children's books and graphic novels. His works include Snake Brought Cake, Don't Scare the Dentist, and the Miles and Jones graphic novel series.

The Miles and Jones series is published by Hachette Aotearoa New Zealand. The series is illustrated by César Lador. Titles in the series include The Anaconda Attack, The Blizzard of Blobs, The Curse of the Carnivorous Cactuses, and The Day of the Dinosaur Disaster.

== Podcasting and advocacy ==
Smith has spoken publicly about multiple sclerosis, partial vision loss and disability. He hosts a podcast for Blind Low Vision NZ, and is an ambassador for Multiple Sclerosis Auckland.

== Bibliography ==
- Snake Brought Cake
- Don't Scare the Dentist
- Miles and Jones: The Anaconda Attack
- Miles and Jones: The Blizzard of Blobs
- Miles and Jones: The Curse of the Carnivorous Cactuses
- Miles and Jones: The Day of the Dinosaur Disaster

== Filmography ==
- 7 Days – writer and performer
- Taskmaster NZ – writer
- Wellington Paranormal – writer
- The Traitors NZ – contestant, season 1 co-winner
