= The Traitors NZ season 2 =

New Zealand television series season

The Traitors NZ
- Season 2
- Promotional poster
- Presented by: Paul Henry
- No. of contestants: 22
- Winner: Bailey Kench
- Runner-up: Donna Officer
- Location: Castle Claremont, Timaru, Canterbury
- No. of episodes: 12

Release
- Original network: Three
- Original release: 1 July – 5 August 2024

Season chronology
- ← Previous; Season 1 Next → Season 3

The second season of the New Zealand television series The Traitors NZ premiered on Three on 1 July 2024. The season was won by Bailey Kench, as a traitor, with Donna Officer, placing as runner-up, as a faithful.

== Production ==
The second season of The Traitors NZ featured twenty-two new players ready to play the game. Filming for the season moved to Claremont Castle. The season was completed in April 2024.

Alongside Paul Henry is the Chinese Crested "Zsa Zsa". Zsa Zsa is portrayed by Kodak bred from Koreke Kennels in North Canterbury.

== Format ==
The contestants arrived at the castle and are referred to as the "Faithful". Among them are the "Traitors", a group of contestants secretly selected by the host, Paul Henry. Each night, the Traitors would decide who to "murder" and that same contestant would leave the game. After the end of each day, where the contestants participated in various challenges to add money to the prize fund, they would participate in the Round Table, where they must decide who to banish from the game, trying to identify the Traitor.

If all the remaining players are Faithful, then the prize money is divided evenly among them. However, if any Traitors remain, they win the entire pot.

== Contestants ==
Unlike the first season, this cast is made up of a complete new cast.

List of The Traitors NZ season 2 contestants
Contestant	Age	Residence	Occupation	Affiliation	Finish
Janay Harding	29	Auckland	MMA Fighter	Faithful	Murdered (Episode 2)
Terry Frisby	51	Invercargill	Account manager	Faithful	Banished (Episode 2)
Wiremu Tapara	27	Tauranga	Council manager	Faithful	Murdered (Episode 3)
Jackie Pope	70	Auckland	Broadcaster	Traitor (Note: Pope was recruited as a Traitor in Episode 1.)	Banished (Episode 4)
Andrew Allemora	37	Auckland	Marketing executive	Faithful	Banished (Episode 4)
Brie Anglesey	24	Auckland	Administrator	Faithful	Murdered (Episode 5)
Whitney Greene	38	Cromwell	Funeral director	Traitor	Banished (Episode 5)
Brittany Cunningham	32	Auckland	Influencer	Faithful	Murdered (Episode 6)
Stephen Lane	67	Hamilton	Retired salesman	Faithful	Banished (Episode 6)
Mike Adams	35	Auckland	Builder	Traitor	Banished (Episode 7)
Mark Mockridge	32	Auckland	Game master	Faithful	Murdered (Episode 8)
Jane Massey	53	Auckland	Diversity officer	Traitor	Banished (Episode 8)
Utah Mann	28	Auckland	Wrestler	Faithful	Murdered (Episode 9)
Molly Fehr	24	Dunedin	Emergency responder	Faithful	Banished (Episode 9)
Ben Porter	22	Sydney, Australia	Actor	Traitor (Note: Porter was recruited as a Traitor in Episode 10.)	Banished (Episode 10)
Cat Hooker	40	Melbourne, Australia	Occupational therapist	Faithful	Murdered (Episode 11)
Noel Calamas	22	Invercargill	Writer	Faithful	Banished (Episode 11)
Siale Tunoka	43	Dunedin	Teacher	Traitor (Note: Tunoka was recruited as a Traitor in Episode 9.)	Banished (Episode 12)
Joe Fa'agase	30	Brisbane, Australia	Influencer	Faithful	Banished (Episode 12)
Jason Kahika	53	Tauranga	Entrepreneur	Faithful	Banished (Episode 12)
Donna Officer	40	Te Puke	Information manager	Faithful	Runner-up (Episode 12)
Bailey Kench	28	Auckland	Videographer	Traitor (Note: Kench was recruited as a Traitor in Episode 8.)	Winner (Episode 12)

== Episodes ==
The Traitors NZ season 2 episodes
No. overall	No. in season	Title	Original release date
11	1	"Episode 1"	1 July 2024
12	2	"Episode 2"	1 July 2024
13	3	"Episode 3"	8 July 2024
14	4	"Episode 4"	8 July 2024
15	5	"Episode 5"	15 July 2024
16	6	"Episode 6"	15 July 2024
17	7	"Episode 7"	22 July 2024
18	8	"Episode 8"	22 July 2024
19	9	"Episode 9"	29 July 2024
20	10	"Episode 10"	29 July 2024
21	11	"Episode 11"	5 August 2024
22	12	"Episode 12"	5 August 2024

== Elimination history ==
Key

The contestant was a Faithful.
The contestant was a Traitor.

Episode	1	2	3/4		4	5	6		7	8		9		10	11		12
Traitors' decision	Jackie	Janay	Wiremu		Andrew; Brie; Noel	Brie	Brittany		None (Note: There was no Murder.)	Mark	Bailey	Siale	Utah	Ben	Cat		None
Traitors' decision	Seduce (Note: In Episode 1, the Traitors were given the opportunity to seduce a Faithful. The Faithful would then have the opportunity to accept or decline. The Traitors chose Jackie, and she accepted the offer.)	Murder			Black List (Note: Instead of selecting one Faithful to be murdered, the Traitors were asked to put three players on the Black List. The next night, only these players would be at risk for murder.)	Murder			None	Ultimatum (Note: At the end of episode 8, Bailey and Mark were chosen by the remaining Traitor to meet the following night. Both to plead with the Traitor to either seduce them or Murder them. The Traitor chose to seduce Mark, but he turned it down and was Murdered instead. Bailey was seduced by default.)		Ultimatum (Note: Following Jane's banishment, Bailey was offered the chance to meet a Faithful face-to-face and offer them an ultimatum: become a Traitor or be Murdered. She chose Siale, who accepted the offer.)	Murder	Seduce (Note: Instead of choosing to murder a player, the Traitors decided to offer Ben the opportunity to become a Traitor. He accepted their offer.)	Murder		None
Shield	None	Siale; Terry; Utah; Whitney	None			Cat; Donna	None		Ben; Cat; Utah	Bailey; Ben; Donna		Ben; Cat		None			
Banishment	None	Terry	Tie (Note: The first round of voting resulted in a tie. Per the rules, a second vote was held where the players involved in the tie would not vote and the remaining players could only vote for those who tied.)	Jackie	Andrew	Whitney	Banish (Note: Cat, Donna, Jane & Stephen had to choose between the next elimination being a Banishment or a Murder. In choosing Banishment, the group could double the money earned from that Day's Mission in banishing a traitor, while failing would lose the money earned. They chose Banishment.)	Stephen	Mike	Jane		Molly		Ben	Noel		Siale
Vote	None	10–7–3–1	5–5–3– 3–2–1	9–8	8–7–3	10–5–1	4–0	10–2–1–1	11–1–1	8–2–1		4–3–2		5–2–1	5–2		3–2
Bailey	No; Vote	Terry	Jane	Molly	Andrew	Noel	No; Vote	Mike	Mike	Jane		Molly		Ben	Donna		Siale
Donna	No; Vote	Mark	Jane	Jackie	Noel	Noel	Banish	Stephen	Mike	Noel		Joe		Noel	Noel		Siale
Jason	No; Vote	Mark	Mark	Molly	Brie	Noel	No; Vote	Mark	Mike	Jane		Molly		Ben	Noel	Noel (Note: Jason used the Dagger making his vote count twice.)	Siale
Joe	No; Vote	Terry	Molly	Molly	Brie	Whitney	No; Vote	Stephen	Mike	Jane		Joe		Ben	Noel		Bailey
Siale	No; Vote	Terry	Noel	Jackie	Noel	Whitney	No; Vote	Stephen	Mike	Jane		Molly		Ben	Noel		Bailey
Noel	No; Vote	Mark	Molly	Molly	Andrew	Whitney	No; Vote	Stephen	Mike	Molly		Molly		Ben	Donna		Banished (Episode 11)
Cat	No; Vote	Terry	Molly	Molly	Noel	Whitney	Banish	Stephen	Mike	Jane		Siale		Siale	Murdered (Episode 11)		
Ben	No; Vote	Terry	Noel	Molly	Andrew	Whitney	No; Vote	Stephen	Mike	Jane		Siale		Siale	Banished (Episode 10)		
Molly	No; Vote	Terry	Jackie	No; Vote	Noel	Whitney	No; Vote	Stephen	Mike	Jane		Siale		Banished (Episode 9)			
Utah	No; Vote	Mark	Jackie	Jackie	Andrew	Whitney	No; Vote	Stephen	Mike	Jane		Murdered (Episode 9)					
Jane	No; Vote	Terry	Molly	Jackie	Noel	Whitney	Banish	Stephen	Mike	Noel		Banished (Episode 8)					
Mark	No; Vote	Jane	Molly	Jackie	Andrew	Noel	No; Vote	Bailey	Jason	Murdered (Episode 8)							
Mike	No; Vote	Brie	Brittany	Jackie	Andrew	Whitney	No; Vote	Stephen	Mark	Banished (Episode 7)							
Stephen	No; Vote	Terry	Jackie	Jackie	Andrew	Mark	Banish	Mark	Banished (Episode 6)								
Brittany	No; Vote	Mark	Jackie	Jackie	Noel	Whitney	Murdered (Episode 6)										
Whitney	No; Vote	Mark	Brittany	Jackie	Noel	Noel	Banished (Episode 5)										
Brie	No; Vote	Terry	Jackie	Molly	Andrew	Murdered (Episode 5)											
Andrew	No; Vote	Jane	Noel	Molly	Brie	Banished (Episode 4)											
Jackie	No; Vote	Terry	Brittany	No; Vote	Banished (Episode 4)												
Wiremu	No; Vote	Mark	Murdered (Episode 3)														
Terry	No; Vote	Jane	Banished (Episode 2)														
Janay	No; Vote	Murdered (Episode 2)															

=== End game ===
Episode	12				
Decision	Banish	Joe	Banish	Jason	Game Over; Traitor Win
Vote	4–0	2–1–1	3–0	2–1	Game Over; Traitor Win
Bailey	Banish	Joe	Banish	Jason	Winner
Donna	Banish	Joe	Banish	Jason	Runner-up
Jason	Banish	Bailey	Banish	Bailey	Banished
Joe	Banish	Jason	Banished		

== Missions ==
Episode	Task description	Time limit	Money earned	Money available	Running total	Shield winner(s)
1	The players split into 5 teams to locate 5 doll parts. Each body part cause them to earn 2 silver bars that equal NZ$500. Once all the body parts are found, three players must go into a different room to find the eyes before the time limit runs out. If they succeed in finding it, they would earn an additional NZ$5,000.	30 minutes	NZ$10,000	NZ$10,000	NZ$10,000 (of NZ$10,000)	No Shield on offer
2	The players are split into two teams. Each team would crawl through a 'minefield' and form a pair or trio to find a true statement about the game. For each correct answer, they would receive 2 silver bars equaling NZ$1,000, and for every wrong answer the mine would blow up. Also there is a mine containing 2 shields for the pair, making up to 4 players able to have a shield.	45 seconds	NZ$7,000	NZ$10,000	NZ$17,000 (of NZ$20,000)	Siale
2	The players are split into two teams. Each team would crawl through a 'minefield' and form a pair or trio to find a true statement about the game. For each correct answer, they would receive 2 silver bars equaling NZ$1,000, and for every wrong answer the mine would blow up. Also there is a mine containing 2 shields for the pair, making up to 4 players able to have a shield.	45 seconds	NZ$7,000	NZ$10,000	NZ$17,000 (of NZ$20,000)	Terry
2	The players are split into two teams. Each team would crawl through a 'minefield' and form a pair or trio to find a true statement about the game. For each correct answer, they would receive 2 silver bars equaling NZ$1,000, and for every wrong answer the mine would blow up. Also there is a mine containing 2 shields for the pair, making up to 4 players able to have a shield.	45 seconds	NZ$7,000	NZ$10,000	NZ$17,000 (of NZ$20,000)	Utah
2	The players are split into two teams. Each team would crawl through a 'minefield' and form a pair or trio to find a true statement about the game. For each correct answer, they would receive 2 silver bars equaling NZ$1,000, and for every wrong answer the mine would blow up. Also there is a mine containing 2 shields for the pair, making up to 4 players able to have a shield.	45 seconds	NZ$7,000	NZ$10,000	NZ$17,000 (of NZ$20,000)	Whitney
3	The players are split into two teams. The 12 players that Wiremu picked would enter the hall, while the rest are separated. The players pick 3 players to receive 4 silver bars each. The players then choose who to eliminate of those in the church by Wiremu's impressions. If they successfully identify the players, they will add NZ$6,000 to the pot.	—N/a	NZ$2,000	NZ$6,000	NZ$19,000 (of NZ$26,000)	No Shield on offer
4	The "deathrow" players are sent to dig a grave fair away. The remaining players form three teams, with a team leader. The team leaders have to choose a cloche on the table which could have a foot, an eyeball, or a tongue of an animal inside. Each team has to guess which is under the cloche within 60 seconds. For every correct body part and animal, they add NZ$500 to the pot.	60 seconds	NZ$1,500	NZ$7,500	NZ$20,500 (of NZ$33,500)	No Shield on offer
5	The players are split into 4 teams of 4, with one player being locked in a crate. The teams have 20 minutes to unlock the crates using numbers that are hidden in mystery boxes that contain hair, meat, soup, bed of nails, and mouse traps. They then have to rush to find the crates by the shoreline that is near a lighthouse. If all teams free the players and reach the lighthouse, they receive NZ$4,000 for the pot. The fastest team received a shield box which only 2 of the players can receive.	20 minutes	NZ$4,000	NZ$4,000	NZ$24,500 (of NZ$37,500)	Cat
5	The players are split into 4 teams of 4, with one player being locked in a crate. The teams have 20 minutes to unlock the crates using numbers that are hidden in mystery boxes that contain hair, meat, soup, bed of nails, and mouse traps. They then have to rush to find the crates by the shoreline that is near a lighthouse. If all teams free the players and reach the lighthouse, they receive NZ$4,000 for the pot. The fastest team received a shield box which only 2 of the players can receive.	20 minutes	NZ$4,000	NZ$4,000	NZ$24,500 (of NZ$37,500)	Donna
6	The players nominate 2 people for collecting pieces of a puzzle while the rest are tied up on a pole. The players can cut the rope and free the players using a dull knife, until all the pieces are collected. The players then have to assemble the pieces together.	20 minutes	NZ$2,000	NZ$2,000	NZ$26,500 (of NZ$39,500)	No Shield on offer
7	The players had to transport silver bars worth NZ$250 a piece in heavy backpacks, one at a time up the hill. Paul was stationed at a checkpoint to sabotage the players for NZ$250 each by offering refreshments and a shield.	60 minutes	$3,500	NZ$8,000	NZ$30,000 (of NZ$47,500)	Cat
7	The players had to transport silver bars worth NZ$250 a piece in heavy backpacks, one at a time up the hill. Paul was stationed at a checkpoint to sabotage the players for NZ$250 each by offering refreshments and a shield.	60 minutes	$3,500	NZ$8,000	NZ$30,000 (of NZ$47,500)	Ben
7	The players had to transport silver bars worth NZ$250 a piece in heavy backpacks, one at a time up the hill. Paul was stationed at a checkpoint to sabotage the players for NZ$250 each by offering refreshments and a shield.	60 minutes	$3,500	NZ$8,000	NZ$30,000 (of NZ$47,500)	Utah
8		—N/a	NZ$1,000	NZ$4,500	NZ$31,000 (of NZ$53,000)	Bailey
8		—N/a	NZ$1,000	NZ$4,500	NZ$31,000 (of NZ$53,000)	Ben
8		—N/a	NZ$1,000	NZ$4,500	NZ$31,000 (of NZ$53,000)	Donna
9		30 minutes	NZ$6,000	NZ$6,000	NZ$37,000 (of NZ$59,000)	Ben
9		30 minutes	NZ$6,000	NZ$6,000	NZ$37,000 (of NZ$59,000)	Cat
10	The 8 players enter an empty warehouse that has 4 electric chairs. 4 of them must sit in the chairs while the other 4 will be asked questions. For every right question, those in the chairs remain safe and they receive NZ$500 to the pot while every incorrect causes those in the chair to be electrocuted. 11 questions are asked.	—N/a	NZ$4,000	NZ$5,500	NZ$41,000 (of NZ$64,500)	No Shield on offer
11		—N/a	NZ$4,000	NZ$6,000	NZ$45,000 (of NZ$70,500)	No Shield on offer
12		30 minutes	NZ$20,000	NZ$20,000	NZ$65,000 (of NZ$90,500)	No Shield on offer
